= 2021–22 Maltese Premier League =

Maltese Premier League
- Season: 2021–22
- Dates: 13 August 2021 – 7 May 2022
- Champions: Hibernians (13th title)
- Relegated: Sliema Wanderers
- Champions League: Hibernians
- Europa Conference League: Floriana; Ħamrun Spartans; Gżira United
- Matches played: 126
- Goals scored: 350 (2.78 per match)
- Top goalscorer: (Brazil) Maxuell (17 goals)
- Biggest home win: Floriana 3–0 Valletta (11 September 2021) Ħamrun Spartans 3–0 St. Lucia (28 November 2021) Gżira United 4–1 Ħamrun Spartans (5 February 2022)
- Biggest away win: Sirens 1–6 Balzan (21 November 2021)
- Highest scoring: Valletta 5–3 St. Lucia (30 October 2021)
- Longest winning run: 5 matches Floriana
- Longest unbeaten run: 18 matches Hibernians
- Longest winless run: 14 matches Sliema Wanderers
- Longest losing run: 7 matches Sliema Wanderers
- All statistics correct as of 9 May 2022.

The 2021–22 Maltese Premier League was the 107th season of the Maltese Premier League, the top-flight league football in Malta. Ħamrun Spartans were the defending champions, having won their eighth title in the previous season.

On 9 April, the previous season was abandoned due to the COVID-19 pandemic in Malta. Following the decision of the Maltese Football Association Executive Committee, the teams that had finished in the relegation places in the previous Premier League season would be relegated to the Challenge League due to having played the prerequisite 75% of matches for the seasons result to stand. However, as the Challenge League teams did not complete 75% of matches, they would not be promoted to the Premier League to replace the exiting teams, meaning that the 2021–22 season will have only 12 teams competing.

The Premier League consists of two rounds. In the first round, every team plays each opponent twice, once "home" and once "away" (in actuality, the designation of home and away is purely arbitrary as most of the clubs do not have their own grounds), for a total of 22 games. The league then splits into two groups. Teams that finish in positions 1–6 compete in the "Top Six" and teams that finish in positions 7–12 play in the "Play-Out".

== Teams ==
Location of teams in 2021–22 Maltese Premier League

Twelve teams will compete in the league.

Team	In league since	City
Balzan	2011	Balzan
Birkirkara	1990	Birkirkara
Floriana	1986	Floriana
Gudja United	2019	Gudja
Gżira United	2016	Gżira
Ħamrun Spartans	2016	Ħamrun
Hibernians	1945	Paola
Mosta	2011	Mosta
St. Lucia	2019	Santa Luċija
Sirens	2019	St. Paul's Bay
Sliema Wanderers	1984	Sliema
Valletta	1944	Valletta

=== Venues ===
2021–22 Maltese Premier League is located in Malta	Ta' Qali	Ta' Qali	Paola
2021–22 Maltese Premier League is located in Malta	Ta' Qali National Stadium	Centenary Stadium	Tony Bezzina Stadium
2021–22 Maltese Premier League is located in Malta	Capacity: 16,997	Capacity: 3,000	Capacity: 2,968

=== Personnel and kits ===
Team	Manager	Kit manufacturer	Shirt sponsor
Balzan	(Spain) Alejandro Pantoja (Caretaker)	Joma	Investors Mutual Limited
Birkirkara	(Malta) Jonathan Holland (Caretaker)	Nike	McDonald's (Front), Inter Sport (Back Top), Visit Malta (Back Bottom)
Floriana	(Italy) Gianluca Atzori	Joma	Harmont & Blaine, Boggi
Gudja United	(Malta) Thane Micallef	Macron	All Nuts, Handy Man, Green Finance
Gżira United	(Malta) Darren Abdilla	Puma	
Ħamrun Spartans	(Serbia) Branko Nišević	Puma	J. Portelli Projects
Hibernians	(Italy) Stefano Sanderra	Joma	Bezzina
Mosta	(Malta) Joseph Grech	Macron	Dimbros, Nilmar
Sirens	(Malta) Winston Muscat	Macron	Café del Mar Malta (Front), Welbee's (Front), Malta National Aquarium (Back), Ozo Group (Sleeves Both)
Sliema Wanderers	(Malta) Noel Turner (Caretaker)	Jartazi	NM group, Sixt
Santa Lucia	(Italy) Giovanni Tedesco	Capelli Sport	Multivend, avanza
Valletta	(Serbia) Danilo Dončić	Puma	Iniala

- Additionally, referee kits are made by Macron, sponsored by TeamSports and FXDD.

=== Managerial changes ===
Team	Outgoing manager	Manner of departure	Date of vacancy	Position in table	Incoming manager	Date of appointment
Sirens	(Italy) Giovanni Tedesco	Resign	27 May 2021	Pre-season	(Malta) Winston Muscat	27 May 2021
Floriana	(Malta) John Buttigieg	End of Contract	14 June 2021	Pre-season	(Italy) Gianluca Atzori	17 June 2021
Balzan	(England) Mark Miller	Mutual consent	19 October 2021	9th	(Malta) Paul Zammit	23 October 2021
Santa Lucia	(Malta) Oliver Spiteri	Sacked	20 January 2022	11th	(Italy) Giovanni Tedesco	12 January 2022
Valletta	(Portugal) Cardoso Mendes	Sacked	3 February 2022	7th	(Serbia) Danilo Dončić	3 February 2022
Ħamrun Spartans	(Malta) Mark Buttigieg	Sacked	14 February 2022	5th	(Serbia) Branko Nišević	15 February 2022
Sliema Wanderers	(Italy) Andrea Pisanu	Sacked	16 February 2022	12th	(Malta) Noel Turner (Caretaker)	16 February 2022
Balzan	(Malta) Paul Zammit	Sacked	15 April 2022	11th	(Spain) Alejandro Pantoja (Caretaker)	23 April 2022
Birkirkara	(Netherlands) André Paus	Sacked	20 April 2022	3rd	(Malta) Jonathan Holland (Caretaker)	20 April 2022

== First phase ==
=== League table ===
Pos	Team	Pld	W	D	L	GF	GA	GD	Pts	Qualification
1	Hibernians	22	13	8	1	39	18	+21	47	Qualification for the Top Six
2	Floriana	22	13	6	3	36	19	+17	45	Qualification for the Top Six
3	Birkirkara	22	9	9	4	30	22	+8	36	Qualification for the Top Six
4	Ħamrun Spartans	22	10	5	7	28	22	+6	35	Qualification for the Top Six
5	Gżira United	22	9	6	7	39	33	+6	33	Qualification for the Top Six
6	Gudja United	22	9	2	11	26	25	+1	29	Qualification for the Top Six
7	Sirens	22	7	6	9	28	38	−10	27	Qualification for the Play-Out
8	Valletta	22	7	5	10	28	34	−6	26	Qualification for the Play-Out
9	Mosta	22	6	7	9	32	41	−9	25	Qualification for the Play-Out
10	Balzan	22	7	2	13	30	33	−3	23	Qualification for the Play-Out
11	Santa Lucia	22	4	10	8	28	38	−10	22	Qualification for the Play-Out
12	Sliema Wanderers	22	2	6	14	12	33	−21	12	Qualification for the Play-Out

Source: Malta Football Association
Rules for classification: 1) Points; 2) Play-offs (only if needed to decide champions, teams for relegation or teams for UEFA competitions).

=== Results ===
Home \ Away	BAL	BIR	FLO	GUD	GŻI	ĦAM	HIB	MOS	SIR	SLI	SLC	VAL
Balzan	—	1–2	1–2	1–0	1–3	2–2	1–2	2–3	2–1	1–0	0–1	2–1
Birkirkara	3–2	—	1–1	2–0	1–0	2–1	1–1	2–2	1–1	2–0	2–3	1–1
Floriana	2–1	1–0	—	2–0	2–1	1–2	1–4	2–0	1–2	2–0	2–2	3–0
Gudja United	1–0	0–1	0–1	—	1–2	1–3	1–2	1–0	0–1	1–0	2–2	2–0
Gżira United	1–2	1–1	1–2	3–2	—	4–1	1–3	3–4	2–1	1–1	2–2	1–1
Ħamrun Spartans	0–1	0–0	2–2	0–1	0–1	—	0–0	2–1	1–0	3–1	3–0	1–2
Hibernians	1–0	2–3	0–0	2–1	3–1	1–0	—	3–2	1–1	1–0	1–1	1–1
Mosta	2–1	0–3	1–1	0–3	2–2	1–2	1–1	—	2–3	1–0	1–0	2–2
Sirens	1–6	3–2	0–3	0–0	1–3	1–1	1–3	1–1	—	2–2	2–1	2–1
Sliema Wanderers	1–0	0–0	0–0	2–3	1–3	0–2	0–3	2–3	1–0	—	1–1	0–3 (Note: Valletta were awarded a 3–0 win after the Malta Football Association's Protests Board upheld their protest. Originally, the match ended in a 2–1 to Sliema Wanderers.)
Santa Lucia	3–3	2–0	1–3	0–3	1–1	0–1	0–0	2–2	1–3	0–0	—	2–1
Valletta	1–0	0–0	0–2	1–3	0–2	0–1	1–4	3–1	3–1	1–0	5–3	—

Source: Malta Football Association
Legend: Blue = home team win; Yellow = draw; Red = away team win.

== Second phase ==
=== Top Six ===
Pos	Team	Pld	W	D	L	GF	GA	GD	Pts	Qualification	HIB	FLO	ĦAM	GŻI	BIR	GUD
1	Hibernians (C)	27	15	9	3	46	23	+23	54	Qualification for the 2022–23 UEFA Champions League	—	0–0	—	—	3–1	—
2	Floriana	27	14	9	4	38	21	+17	51	Qualification for the 2022–23 UEFA Europa Conference League	—	—	0–0	0–1	—	—
3	Ħamrun Spartans	27	13	6	8	33	24	+9	45	Qualification for the 2022–23 UEFA Europa Conference League	2–1	—	—	2–0	—	—
4	Gżira United	27	12	7	8	46	38	+8	43	Qualification for the 2022–23 UEFA Europa Conference League	2–1	—	—	—	1–1	3–1
5	Birkirkara	27	10	11	6	35	27	+8	41		—	0–0	0–1	—	—	3–0
6	Gudja United	27	10	2	15	29	35	−6	32		0–2	1–2	1–0	—	—	—

Source: Malta Football Association
Rules for classification: 1) Points; 2) Play-offs (only if needed to decide champions, teams for relegation or teams for UEFA competitions).
(C) Champions

=== Play-Out ===
Pos	Team	Pld	W	D	L	GF	GA	GD	Pts	Relegation	VAL	SIR	MOS	BAL	SLC	SLI
7	Valletta	27	10	6	11	39	40	−1	36		—	—	2–3	—	2–1	3–1
8	Sirens	27	9	7	11	40	48	−8	34		0–3	—	—	2–3	—	—
9	Mosta	27	8	8	11	41	50	−9	32		—	2–3	—	3–2	1–1	—
10	Balzan	27	9	3	15	37	42	−5	30		1–1	—	—	—	0–3	—
11	Santa Lucia (Note: Santa Lucia were originally relegated to 2022–23 Maltese Challenge League. On 16 June 2022 the Malta Football Association decide that they will play in the Premier League instead of Pembroke Athleta (originally Promoted) due to Financing Problems.)	27	5	12	10	36	45	−9	27	~~Relegation to the 2022–23 Maltese Challenge League~~	—	2–2	—	—	—	1–2
12	Sliema Wanderers (R)	27	4	6	17	16	43	−27	18	Relegation to the 2022–23 Maltese Challenge League	—	0–5	1–0	0–1	—	—

Updated to match(es) played on 7 May 2022. Source: Malta Football Association
Rules for classification: 1) Points; 2) Play-offs (only if needed to decide champions, teams for relegation or teams for UEFA competitions).
(R) Relegated

== Season statistics ==
=== Scoring ===
==== Top scorers ====
As of 6 May 2022

Rank	Player	Club	Goals
1	(Brazil) Maxuell	Gżira United	17
2	(Malta) Jurgen Degabriele	Hibernians	14
3	(Italy) Mario Fontanella	Valletta	12
4	(Malta) Luke Montebello	Birkirkara	11
4	(Nigeria) Sunday Akinbule	Mosta	11
4	(Brazil) Jefferson Assis	Gżira United	11
7	(Malta) Jake Grech	Hibernians	9
7	(Jamaica) Kemar Reid	Floriana	9
7	(Brazil) Vitor da Silva Vieira	Sirens	9
10	(Slovenia) Vito Plut	Santa Lucia	8
10	(Romania) Bogdan Gavrila	Sirens	8

==== Hat-tricks ====
Player	For	Against	Result	Date
(Italy) Mario Fontanella	Valletta	Sirens	3–1 (H)	17 October 2021
(Brazil) Jefferson Assis	Gżira United	Ħamrun Spartans	4–1 (H)	5 February 2022

=== Clean sheets ===
Rank	Player	Club	Clean sheets
1	(Bulgaria) Georgi Kitanov	Floriana	11
2	(Malta) Henry Bonello	Ħamrun Spartans	10
3	(Malta) Glenn Zammit	Gudja United	9
4	(Guinea) Ibrahim Koné	Hibernians	7
5	(Portugal) Daniel Fernandes	Birkirkara	5
5	(Malta) Amara Sylla	Birkirkara	5
7	(Italy) Alessandro Guarnone	Valletta	4
8	(Malta) Justin Haber	Santa Lucia	3
9	(Serbia) Vukasin Vranes	Balzan	2
9	(Malta) Anthony Curmi	Gżira United	2
9	(Malta) Matthew Calleja Cremona	Hibernians	2
9	(Malta) Timothy Aquilina	Sliema Wanderers	2
9	(Malta) Rashed Al-Tumi	Sliema Wanderers	2
9	(Saint Kitts and Nevis) Julani Archibald	Santa Lucia	2
9	(Nigeria) Ini Etim Akpan	Mosta	2
9	(Malta) Johnathan Debono	Sirens	2

=== Discipline ===
==== Player ====
- Most yellow cards: 11
  - (Brazil) Leandro Almeida (Hibernians)
- Most red cards: 2
  - (Malta) Enrico Pepe (Birkirkara)
  - (Malta) Luke Tabone (Gżira United)
  - (France) Claude Dielna (Ħamrun Spartans)
  - (Brazil) Victor Luiz (Santa Lucia)
  - (Netherlands) Danny Holla (Sliema Wanderers)

==== Club ====
- Most yellow cards: 94
  - Sliema Wanderers
- Most red cards: 6
  - Valletta

== Awards ==
=== Monthly awards ===
Month	Manager of the Month		Player of the Month	
Month	Manager	Club	Player	Club
August and September	(Italy) Stefano Sanderra	Hibernians	(Malta) Jake Grech	Hibernians
October	(Malta) Winston Muscat	Sirens	(Malta) Luke Montebello	Birkirkara
November	(Italy) Stefano Sanderra	Hibernians	(Malta) Jake Grech	Hibernians
December	(Malta) Paul Zammit	Balzan	(Malta) Jurgen Degabriele	Hibernians
January	(Malta) Thane Micallef	Gudja United	(Malta) Kurt Shaw	Sliema Wanderers
February	(Italy) Gianluca Atzori	Floriana	(Malta) Jan Busuttil	Floriana
March	(Italy) Stefano Sanderra	Hibernians	(Malta) Jurgen Degabriele	Hibernians
April and May	(Italy) Stefano Sanderra	Hibernians	(Malta) Jan Busuttil	Floriana
