= 2022–23 Maltese Premier League =

Maltese Premier League
- Season: 2022–23
- Dates: 19 August 2022 – 1 May 2023
- Champions: Ħamrun Spartans (9th title)
- Relegated: Pietà Hotspurs
- UEFA Champions League: Ħamrun Spartans
- UEFA Europa Conference League: Balzan; Birkirkara; Gżira United
- Matches played: 184
- Goals scored: 488 (2.65 per match)
- Top goalscorer: Jefferson Assis (20 Goals)
- Biggest home win: Birkirkara 5-0 Żebbuġ Rangers (7 January 2023); Birkirkara 5-0 Hibernians (2 April 2023)
- Biggest away win: Pietà Hotspurs 0-6 Valletta (26 August 2022); Pietà Hotspurs 0-6 Gżira United (4 February 2023)
- Highest scoring: Pietà Hotspurs 0-6 Valletta (26 August 2022); Gudja United 3-3 Gżira United (26 August 2022); Sirens 3-3 Żebbuġ Rangers (21 October 2022); Sirens 3-3 Valletta (1 February 2023)
- Longest winning run: Ħamrun Spartans (8 Games)
- Longest unbeaten run: Ħamrun Spartans (15 Games)
- Longest winless run: Pietà Hotspurs (14 Games)
- Longest losing run: Pietà Hotspurs (6 Games)

The 2022–23 Maltese Premier League was the 108th season of top-flight league football in Malta. The season began on 19 August 2022 and ended on 1 May 2023. Hibernians were the defending champions, having won their 13th title in the previous season.

== Teams ==
Location of teams in 2022–23 Maltese Premier League

Fourteen teams will compete in the league – the top ten teams from the previous season and the four teams promoted from the Maltese Challenge League. The promoted teams are Żebbuġ Rangers, Marsaxlokk, and Pietà Hotspurs, who will return after an absence of five, seven, ten and eight years from the top flight respectively. They will replace Sliema Wanderers (relegated after thirty-seven years in the top flight).

Team	In league since	City
Balzan	2011	Balzan
Birkirkara	1990	Birkirkara
Floriana	1986	Floriana
Gudja United	2019	Gudja
Gżira United	2016	Gżira
Ħamrun Spartans	2016	Ħamrun
Hibernians	1945	Paola
Marsaxlokk	2022	Marsaxlokk
Mosta	2011	Mosta
Pietà Hotspurs	2022	Pietà, Malta
St. Lucia	2019	Santa Luċija
Sirens	2019	St. Paul's Bay
Valletta	1944	Valletta
Żebbuġ Rangers	2022	Żebbuġ

=== Stadiums ===
On 17 April 2023. The Malta Football Association introduce another stadium at Gozo Stadium in Xewkija due to the final fixture of the season to be played four matches at the same time.

2022–23 Maltese Premier League is located in Malta	Ta' Qali	Ta' Qali	Paola	Xewkija
2022–23 Maltese Premier League is located in Malta	Ta' Qali National Stadium	Centenary Stadium	Tony Bezzina Stadium	Gozo Stadium
2022–23 Maltese Premier League is located in Malta	Capacity: 16,997	Capacity: 3,000	Capacity: 2,968	Capacity: 1,644

=== Personnel and kits ===
Team	Manager	Kit manufacturer	Shirt sponsor (front)	Shirt sponsor (back)	Shirt sponsor (sleeve)
Balzan	(Malta) Oliver Spiteri	Joma			
Birkirkara	(Italy) Giovanni Tedesco	Nike	McDonald's	Inter Sport (Top), Visit Malta (Bottom)	
Floriana	(Italy) Gianluca Atzori	Joma	Harmont & Blaine, Greens Supermarket		Go & Fun (Right)
Gudja United	(Malta) Ludvic Bartolo (Caretaker)	Macron	Handy Man, SixSevenEight	Apex Group (Top)	Thomas Smith Insurance Broker (Left)
Gżira United	(Malta) Darren Abdilla	Joma	Gree	Visit Malta (Bottom)	
Ħamrun Spartans	(Serbia) Branko Nišević	Puma	J. Portelli Projects	Midea (Top), Meridianbet (Bottom), Visit Malta (Bottom)	Ta' Fonzu (Right), Tescoma (Left)
Hibernians	(Malta) Silvio Vella	Joma	Bezzina		
Marsaxlokk	(Argentina) Pablo Doffo	Joma	1padel		
Mosta	(Malta) Joseph Grech	Macron	Simple Clean, PG Group	Teamsport (Bottom)	
Pietà Hotspurs	(Malta) Rodney Bugeja	Jartazi	Famalco.net, A1 Supplies, Xuereb Installation	Farstone Construction (Top)	
Santa Lucia	(Italy) Enzo Potenza	Capelli Sport	Multivend, avanza	Elmo (Top), Konica Minolta (Bottom)	Yellow Army (Left), Levissima (Right)
Sirens	(Malta) Winston Muscat	Macron	Café del Mar Malta, Welbee's	Arringo (Top), Malta National Aquarium (Bottom)	
Valletta	(Malta) Thane Micallef	Nike	Iniala	Inter Sport (Top)	
Żebbuġ Rangers	(Malta) Brian Spiteri	Joma	The Convenience Shop, Coop Italia		

- Additionally, referee kits are made by Macron

=== Managerial changes ===
Team	Outgoing manager	Manner of departure	Date of vacancy	Position in table	Incoming manager	Date of appointment
Santa Lucia	(Italy) Giovanni Tedesco	End of contract	18 May 2022	Pre-season	(Spain) Pablo Cortés Sánchez	6 July 2022
Birkirkara	(Malta) Jonathan Holland	End of caretaker spell	18 May 2022	Pre-season	(Italy) Giovanni Tedesco	18 May 2022
Valletta	(Serbia) Danilo Dončić	End of contract	24 May 2022	Pre-season	(Malta) Thane Micallef	29 May 2022
Balzan	(Spain) Alejandro Pantoja	End of caretaker spell	29 May 2022	Pre-season	(Malta) Oliver Spiteri	5 June 2022
Gudja United	(Malta) Thane Micallef	Signed by Valletta	29 May 2022	Pre-season	(Italy) Andrea Agostinelli	8 June 2022
Hibernians	(Italy) Stefano Sanderra	Signed by Lazio Primavera	8 July 2022	Pre-season	(Italy) Andrea Pisanu	8 July 2022
Santa Lucia	(Spain) Pablo Cortés Sánchez	Sacked	3 November 2022	12th	(Italy) Enzo Potenza	3 November 2022
Hibernians	(Italy) Andrea Pisanu	Sacked	6 February 2023	5th	(Malta) Silvio Vella	7 February 2023
Gudja United	(Italy) Andrea Agostinelli	Signed by Benevento	11 April 2023	10th	(Malta) Ludvic Bartolo (Caretaker)	12 April 2023

== League table ==
Pos	Team	Pld	W	D	L	GF	GA	GD	Pts	Qualification or relegation
1	Ħamrun Spartans (C)	26	22	3	1	45	10	+35	69	Qualification for the Champions League first qualifying round
2	Birkirkara	26	14	8	4	50	20	+30	50	Qualification for the Europa Conference League first qualifying round (Note: The winners of the 2022–23 Maltese FA Trophy, Birkirkara, qualified for the 2023–24 UEFA Europa Conference League. As they finished second, the fourth-placed team in the league also qualified for the Europa Conference League.)
3	Gżira United	26	14	6	6	46	19	+27	48	Qualification for the Europa Conference League first qualifying round
4	Balzan (Note: Hibernians and Balzan finished equal on points, A play-off decider determines the fourth place and Qualification for the UEFA Europa Conference League)	26	14	4	8	37	32	+5	46	Qualification for the Europa Conference League first qualifying round
5	Hibernians	26	14	4	8	45	37	+8	46	
6	Mosta	26	14	4	8	47	33	+14	46	
7	Floriana	26	10	7	9	30	26	+4	37	
8	Valletta	26	9	10	7	37	23	+14	37	
9	Sirens	26	8	9	9	25	32	−7	33	
10	Gudja United	26	8	5	13	28	39	−11	29	
11	Marsaxlokk	26	5	10	11	28	38	−10	25	
12	Santa Lucia (O)	26	4	3	19	20	49	−29	15	Qualification for the relegation play-offs
13	Żebbuġ Rangers (R)	26	4	2	20	21	58	−37	14	Relegation to the Maltese Challenge League
14	Pietà Hotspurs (R)	26	3	3	20	22	65	−43	12	Relegation to the Maltese Challenge League

Source: Malta Football Association
Rules for classification: 1) Points; 2) Play-offs (only if needed to decide champions, teams for relegation, or teams for UEFA competitions).
(C) Champions; (O) Play-off winners; (R) Relegated

== Results ==
Home \ Away	BAL	BIR	FLO	GUD	GŻI	ĦAM	HIB	MAR	MOS	PIE	SLC	SIR	VAL	ŻEB
Balzan	—	2–1	3–1	0–1	0–2	0–4	0–2	0–0	1–2	3–2	3–1	0–0	1–3	3–1
Birkirkara	2–1	—	1–0	3–1	1–1	0–0	5–0	1–1	1–2	3–2	2–0	2–0	3–0	5–0
Floriana	0–0	1–2	—	1–1	1–1	0–1	2–5	1–1	1–1	2–0	1–0	1–0	1–0	1–0
Gudja United	0–1	1–1	0–3	—	3–3	0–1	1–4	1–2	2–1	1–0	3–0	0–1	1–2	2–1
Gżira United	0–1	1–3	1–0	1–1	—	1–2	2–0	0–0	1–2	4–0	3–1	1–0	1–2	4–0
Ħamrun Spartans	1–0	0–0	2–0	2–0	1–0	—	1–0	1–0	2–1	2–0	2–0	3–0	1–0	4–0
Hibernians	1–2	1–1	1–0	2–1	1–2	1–4	—	1–3	2–0	2–1	3–2	1–1	0–4	1–0
Marsaxlokk	1–2	1–0	1–5	1–1	0–3	0–1	1–1	—	1–4	1–2	2–2	1–2	1–2	1–1
Mosta	2–3	1–1	2–0	1–2	0–2	1–2	0–5	2–1	—	4–0	2–1	1–1	3–1	2–0
Pietà Hotspurs	2–3	1–5	1–3	3–1	0–6	1–2	1–4	1–1	1–4	—	1–2	0–1	0–6	0–2
Santa Lucia	0–2	0–4	0–2	1–3	0–1	1–1	2–3	0–1	1–2	2–1	—	0–0	0–2	2–1
Sirens	1–3	1–0	2–2	2–0	0–3	0–2	0–1	3–2	1–2	0–0	2–1	—	3–3	3–3
Valletta	0–0	1–1	0–0	0–1	0–0	0–1	1–1	1–1	0–0	1–1	0–1	0–0	—	3–0
Żebbuġ Rangers	2–3	1–2	0–1	2–0	0–2	4–2	0–2	0–3	0–5	0–1	2–0	0–1	1–5	—

Source: Malta Football Association
Legend: Blue = home team win; Yellow = draw; Red = away team win.
For upcoming matches, an "a" indicates there is an article about the rivalry between the two participants.

== Fourth Place tie-breaker ==
Because Hibernians, Balzan, and Mosta were tied on points after all matches played, their head-to-head results in Play-Out were decisive. Mosta had the fewest points in those matches and immediately finished 6th Place. The best two teams Hibernians and Balzan will play a deciding game to determine the Fourth Place and qualification for UEFA Europa Conference League.

1 May 2023	Hibernians	2–3 (a.e.t.)	Balzan	Ta' Qali
14:00 CEST	Dunstan Vella 66'; Jurgen Degabriele 90'		Matheus Nogureira Albuguerque de Sousa 45+1'; Angel Yesid Torres Quinones 88'; Bogdan Mladenovic 91'	Stadium: Ta' Qali National Stadium; Referee: Ishmael Barbara

== Promotion or Relegation play-offs ==
A play-offs match shall be played between the twelfth-placed team in the Premier League, Santa Lucia, and the third-placed team in the Maltese Challenge League, Żejtun Corinthians. The winner will play in the 2023-24 Maltese Premier League.

28 April 2023	Santa Lucia (1)	2–0	Żejtun Corinthians (2)	Ta' Qali
19:00 CEST	Kyrian Nwoko 2'; Robert Hehedosh 17'			Stadium: Centenary Stadium; Referee: Fyodor Zammit

== Season statistics ==
=== Scoring ===
==== Top scorers ====
As of 22 April 2023

Rank	Player	Club	Goals
1	(Brazil) Jefferson Assis	Gżira United	20
2	(Democratic Republic of the Congo) Elvis Mashike Sukisa	Ħamrun Spartans	18
3	(Colombia) Ángel Torres	Balzan	14
3	(Malta) Jurgen Degabriele	Hibernians	14
5	(Argentina) Enzo Daniel Cabrera	Birkirkara	13
5	(Malta) Jake Grech	Hibernians	13
7	(Brazil) Maxuell Maia	Gżira United	11
7	(Australia) Charles Lokolingoy	Żebbuġ Rangers	11
9	(Nigeria) Christ Evo Ememe	Mosta	10
9	(Malta) Zachary Brincat	Mosta	10

==== Hat-tricks ====
Player	For	Against	Result	Stadium	Date
(Colombia) Ángel Torres	Balzan	Zebbug Rangers	3–1 (H)	Centenary Stadium, Ta' Qali	19 August 2022
(Nigeria) Evo Christ Ememe	Mosta	Marsaxlokk	4–1 (A)	Centenary Stadium, Ta' Qali	27 August 2022
(Malta) Jurgen Degabriele	Hibernians	Mosta	5–0 (A)	Tony Bezzina Stadium, Paola	5 September 2022
(Australia) Charles Lokolingoy	Zebbug Rangers	Sirens	3–3 (A)	Ta' Qali National Stadium, Ta' Qali	21 October 2022
(Brazil) Jefferson Assis	Gżira United	Pietà Hotspurs	6–0 (A)	Tony Bezzina Stadium, Paola	4 February 2023
(Malta) Zachary Brincat	Mosta	Zebbug Rangers	5–0 (A)	Tony Bezzina Stadium, Paola	15 April 2023
(Brazil) Jefferson Assis	Gżira United	Zebbug Rangers	4–0 (H)	Centenary Stadium, Ta' Qali	21 April 2023

=== Clean sheets ===
Rank	Player	Club	Clean sheets
1	(Malta) Henry Bonello	Ħamrun Spartans	15
2	(Croatia) Darijan Zarkov	Gzira United	12
3	(Bulgaria) Georgi Kitanov	Floriana	8
4	(Italy) Alessandro Guarnone	Valletta	7
4	(Italy) Giacomo Nava	Birkirkara	7
6	(Malta) Jonathan Debono	Balzan	5
6	(Malta) Justin Haber	Hibernians	5
6	(Malta) Ini Etim Akpan	Mosta	5
6	(Malta) Andrea Cassar	Sirens	5
10	(Malta) Glenn Zammit	Gudja United	4
10	(Serbia) Marko Drobnjak	Marsaxlokk	4
10	(Malta) Matthew Grech	Sirens	4

=== Discipline ===
==== Player ====
- Most yellow cards: 10
  - (Colombia) Luis Riascos (Gżira United)
  - (Malta) Neil Anthony Micallef (Gudja United)
- Most red cards: 2
  - (Colombia) Luis Riascos (Gżira United)
  - (Malta) Neil Anthony Micallef (Gudja United)
  - (Argentina) Juan Cruz Aguilar (Marsaxlokk)
  - (Albania) Eslit Sala (Valletta)

==== Club ====
- Most yellow cards: 77
  - Marsaxlokk
- Most red cards: 8
  - Marsaxlokk

== Awards ==
=== Monthly awards ===
Month	Manager of the Month		Player of the Month	
Month	Manager	Club	Player	Club
August	(Italy) Giovanni Tedesco	Birkirkara	(Brazil) Jefferson Assis	Gzira United
September	(Italy) Giovanni Tedesco	Birkirkara	(Brazil) Jefferson Assis	Gzira United
October	(Serbia) Branko Nišević	Hamrun Spartans	(Malta) Matthew Guillaumier	Hamrun Spartans
November	(Italy) Andrea Pisanu	Hibernians	(Malta) Jurgen Degabriele	Hibernians
December	(Serbia) Branko Nišević	Hamrun Spartans	(Malta) Matthew Guillaumier	Hamrun Spartans
January	(Italy) Giovanni Tedesco	Birkirkara	(Brazil) Jefferson Assis	Gzira United
February	(Serbia) Branko Nišević	Hamrun Spartans	(Colombia) Ángel Torres (Democratic Republic of the Congo) Elvis Mashike Sukisa	Balzan Hamrun Spartans
March	(Italy) Giovanni Tedesco	Birkirkara	(Malta) Yannick Yankam	Birkirkara
April	(Italy) Giovanni Tedesco	Birkirkara		
