= 2023–24 Maltese Premier League =

Maltese Premier League
- Season: 2023–24
- Dates: 15 September 2023 – 4 May 2024
- Champions: Ħamrun Spartans (10th title)
- Relegated: Gudja United; Santa Lucia; Sirens; Valletta
- UEFA Champions League: Ħamrun Spartans
- UEFA Conference League: Floriana; Marsaxlokk; Sliema Wanderers
- Matches played: 182
- Goals scored: 443 (2.43 per match)
- Top goalscorer: Luke Montebello (21 Goals)
- Biggest home win: Marsaxlokk 5–1 Naxxar Lions (15 September 2023); Naxxar Lions 4–0 Santa Lucia (1 October 2023); Floriana 4–0 Mosta (13 April 2024); Naxxar Lions 4–0 Valletta (28 April 2023)
- Biggest away win: Balzan 1–7 Ħamrun Spartans (27 January 2024); Gudja United 0–6 Sliema Wanderers (27 April 2024)
- Highest scoring: Balzan 1–7 Ħamrun Spartans (27 January 2024)
- Longest winning run: Ħamrun Spartans (8 matches)
- Longest unbeaten run: Floriana; Ħamrun Spartans (11 matches)
- Longest winless run: Gudja United (26 matches)
- Longest losing run: Gudja United (16 matches)
- All statistics correct as of 5 May 2024.

The 2023–24 Maltese Premier League was the 109th season of top-flight league football in Malta. The season began on 15 September 2023 and ended in April 2024. The season saw the relegation of Valletta, one of the most historic teams in Maltese football, for the first time in their history while bearing this name. The Maltese Premier League saw a 22% increase in attendance, with the Floriana versus Ħamrun Spartans match on 27 April drawing the largest crowd of 9,090 spectators.

== Teams ==
The league consisted of fourteen teams; the top twelve teams from the previous season, and two teams promoted from the 2022–23 Maltese Challenge League. Ħamrun Spartans entered the season as defending champions. Sliema Wanderers and Naxxar Lions were promoted and returned to the Maltese Premier League after one and five years of absence, respectively. They replaced the 2022–23 Maltese Premier League bottom two teams, Pietà Hotspurs and Żebbuġ Rangers (both relegated after one year in the top flight).

On 13 April 2023, The Malta Football Association announced that four clubs would be relegated to the Maltese Challenge League at the end of the season, as the number of clubs would be reduced to twelve starting from the 2024–25 season. As a result, the Maltese Premier League play-off was scrapped for this season, and this was the last season to consist of fourteen teams.

Location of teams in 2023–24 Maltese Premier League

Team	In league since	City
Balzan	2011	Balzan
Birkirkara	1990	Birkirkara
Floriana	1986	Floriana
Gudja United	2019	Gudja
Gżira United	2016	Gżira
Ħamrun Spartans	2016	Ħamrun
Hibernians	1945	Paola
Marsaxlokk	2022	Marsaxlokk
Mosta	2011	Mosta
Naxxar Lions	2023	Naxxar
Santa Lucia	2019	Santa Luċija
Sliema Wanderers	2023	Sliema
Sirens	2019	St. Paul's Bay
Valletta	1944	Valletta

== Venues ==
On 29 April 2024, the Malta Football Association introduced another stadium, Victor Tedesco Stadium due to the final fixture of the season that played four matches at the same time.

2023–24 Maltese Premier League is located in Malta	Ta' Qali	Ta' Qali	Paola	Hamrun
2023–24 Maltese Premier League is located in Malta	Ta' Qali National Stadium	Centenary Stadium	Tony Bezzina Stadium	Victor Tedesco Stadium
2023–24 Maltese Premier League is located in Malta	Capacity: 16,997	Capacity: 3,000	Capacity: 2,968	Capacity: 1,962

=== Personnel and kits ===
Team	Manager	Kit manufacturer	Shirt sponsor (front)	Shirt sponsor (back)	Shirt sponsor (sleeve)
Balzan	(Malta) Oliver Spiteri	Joma	MBI Group	Visit Malta (Bottom)	
Birkirkara	(Malta) Jose Borg	Nike	McDonald's	Inter Sport (Top)	Visit Malta (Right)
Floriana	(Italy) Mauro Camoranesi	Joma	Harmont & Blaine, Greens Supermarket		Go & Fun (Right)
Gudja United	(Malta) Renzo Kerr-Cumbo	Macron	Handy Man, SixSevenEight	Apex Group (Top)	Thomas Smith Insurance Broker (Left)
Gżira United	(Malta) Andrew Cohen	Joma		Finanzi (Top), Recruit Giant (Bottom), Visit Malta (Bottom)	
Ħamrun Spartans	(Italy) Luciano Zauri	Puma	J. Portelli	Meridianbet (Bottom), Besteam audio (Bottom)	Ta' Fonzu (Right), Tescoma (Left)
Hibernians	(Serbia) Branko Nišević	Joma	Bezzina		
Marsaxlokk	(Malta) Winston Muscat	Joma	1padel		Mr. Fitz Restaurant Marsaxlokk (Left)
Mosta	(Malta) Joseph Grech	Macron		Teamsport (Bottom)	
Naxxar Lions	(Malta) George Vella	Joma	Brown's, sottozero	Zarb Coaches (Top), Badass, McQueen, Sammut Concrete Supplies (Bottom)	Welbee's (Right), Würth, Centerparc (Left)
Santa Lucia	(Italy) Alessandro Zinnari	Capelli Sport	Multivend, avanza	Elmo (Top), Konica Minolta (Bottom)	Yellow Army (Left), Levissima (Right)
Sliema Wanderers	(Malta) Paul Zammit	Adidas	NMGroup, Comeon Group, Xace	Daikin, Zarb Coaches (Bottom)	
Sirens	(Malta) Stephen Damato	Macron	Café del Mar Malta, Welbee's	Arringo (Top), Malta National Aquarium (Bottom)	
Valletta	(Argentina) Juan Cruz Gill (Caretaker)	Nike	Iniala	Inter Sport (Top)	Toyotomi, Da Mattia (Left), 5 Beans (Right)

- Additionally, referee kits are made by Macron

=== Managerial changes ===
Team	Outgoing manager	Manner of departure	Date of vacancy	Position in table	Incoming manager	Date of appointment
Ħamrun Spartans	(Serbia) Branko Nišević	Resigned	22 April 2023	Pre-season	(Italy) Luciano Zauri	29 April 2023
Sirens	(Malta) Winston Muscat	Resigned	28 April 2023	Pre-season	(Malta) Stephen Damato	24 May 2023
Marsaxlokk	(Argentina) Pablo Doffo	End of contract	6 May 2023	Pre-season	(Malta) Winston Muscat	14 June 2023
Floriana	(Italy) Gianluca Atzori	End of contract	10 May 2023	Pre-season	(Italy) Mauro Camoranesi	5 June 2023
Hibernians	(Malta) Silvio Vella	Mutual consent	1 June 2023	Pre-season	(Serbia) Branko Nišević	17 July 2023
Santa Lucia	(Italy) Enzo Potenza	Resigned	21 June 2023	Pre-season	(Italy) Alessandro Zinnari	12 July 2023
Gudja United	(Malta) Ludvic Bartolo	End of caretaker spell	29 July 2023	Pre-season	(Malta) Jesmond Zammit	29 July 2023
Valletta	(Malta) Thane Micallef	Sacked	2 October 2023	8th	(Italy) Enzo Potenza	7 October 2023
Birkirkara	(Italy) Giovanni Tedesco	Resigned	26 November 2023	10th	(Malta) Brian Chetcuti (Caretaker)	26 November 2023
Gudja United	(Malta) Jesmond Zammit	Sacked	21 December 2023	14th	(Malta) Renzo Kerr-Cumbo	27 December 2023
Gżira United	(Malta) Darren Abdilla	Resigned	17 January 2024	9th	(Malta) Andrew Cohen	18 January 2024
Birkirkara	(Malta) Brian Chetcuti	End of caretaker spell	5 February 2024	7th	(Malta) Jose Borg	5 February 2024
Valletta	(Italy) Enzo Potenza	Resign	26 February 2024	12th	(Argentina) Juan Cruz Gill (Caretaker)	26 February 2024

== League table ==
Pos	Team	Pld	W	D	L	GF	GA	GD	Pts	Qualification or relegation
1	Ħamrun Spartans (C)	26	19	5	2	61	16	+45	62	Qualification for the Champions League first qualifying round
2	Floriana	26	18	3	5	53	19	+34	57	Qualification for the Conference League first qualifying round
3	Sliema Wanderers	26	14	8	4	34	12	+22	50	Qualification for the Conference League second qualifying round (Note: Sliema Wanderers qualified for the Conference League second qualifying round by winning the 2023–24 Maltese FA Trophy. Since they qualified based on league position, the second Conference League first round spot was passed to the fourth-placed team.)
4	Marsaxlokk	26	12	7	7	40	23	+17	43	Qualification for the Conference League first qualifying round
5	Birkirkara	26	9	9	8	28	27	+1	36	
6	Naxxar Lions	26	9	8	9	32	35	−3	35	
7	Hibernians	26	9	8	9	29	28	+1	35	
8	Balzan	26	8	10	8	26	28	−2	34	
9	Gżira United	26	9	6	11	38	33	+5	33	
10	Mosta	26	7	10	9	19	32	−13	31	
11	Santa Lucia (R)	26	8	6	12	25	41	−16	30	Relegation to Maltese Challenge League
12	Valletta (R)	26	6	9	11	26	31	−5	27	Relegation to Maltese Challenge League
13	Sirens (R)	26	3	7	16	17	50	−33	16	Relegation to Maltese Challenge League
14	Gudja United (R)	26	0	6	20	14	67	−53	6	Relegation to Maltese Challenge League

Source: Malta Football Association
Rules for classification: 1) Points; 2) Play-offs (only if needed to decide champions, teams for relegation or teams for UEFA competitions).
(C) Champions; (R) Relegated

== Results ==
Home \ Away	BAL	BIR	FLO	GUD	GŻI	ĦAM	HIB	MAR	MOS	NXR	SLC	SLI	SIR	VAL
Balzan	—	0–3	0–3	2–0	1–0	1–7	0–0	0–0	0–0	1–2	0–1	1–1	3–0	0–0
Birkirkara	1–1	—	1–2	2–0	3–2	3–0	1–1	0–2	0–2	0–2	1–2	1–0	2–2	1–1
Floriana	2–2	2–0	—	5–1	0–1	0–5	2–0	3–2	4–0	1–1	2–0	2–0	3–0	1–0
Gudja United	2–2	1–1	1–1	—	1–6	0–4	0–3	1–1	0–1	2–4	0–4	0–6	1–2	0–3
Gżira United	1–1	0–0	3–1	3–0	—	0–1	0–4	2–4	2–1	1–1	1–2	0–2	1–0	1–1
Ħamrun Spartans	1–0	2–0	1–0	3–0	2–1	—	1–1	1–2	1–1	4–1	4–1	1–1	2–0	1–1
Hibernians	0–2	0–1	0–2	1–0	3–2	1–2	—	0–2	0–0	0–2	3–2	0–1	2–1	2–2
Marsaxlokk	0–1	0–0	1–0	2–1	1–1	0–1	1–1	—	1–2	5–1	3–0	1–2	3–1	0–1
Mosta	0–2	0–2	0–3	0–0	0–3	0–4	3–1	3–2	—	2–0	1–1	0–3	0–0	1–0
Naxxar Lions	1–1	2–0	0–3	2–1	0–1	0–4	0–0	0–0	0–0	—	4–0	1–4	1–2	4–0
Santa Lucia	0–1	2–2	0–4	1–1	2–1	1–3	0–2	0–3	1–0	1–0	—	0–1	1–1	2–0
Sliema Wanderers	1–0	0–0	0–2	2–0	1–0	0–0	0–0	0–1	0–0	0–0	3–1	—	3–0	1–0
Sirens	1–4	1–2	0–3	2–0	0–4	0–4	1–2	1–1	1–1	1–1	0–0	0–1	—	0–3
Valletta	1–0	0–1	0–2	5–2	1–1	1–2	0–2	0–2	1–1	1–2	1–1	1–1	2–0	—

Source: Malta Football Association
Legend: Blue = home team win; Yellow = draw; Red = away team win.
For upcoming matches, an "a" indicates there is an article about the rivalry between the two participants.

== Season statistics ==
=== Scoring ===
==== Top scorers ====
As of 28 April 2024

Rank	Player	Club	Goals
1	(Malta) Luke Montebello	Ħamrun Spartans	21
2	(Malta) Kemar Reid	Floriana	13
2	(Brazil) Yuri	Marsaxlokk	13
4	(Romania) Andrei Ciolacu	Birkirkara	11
4	(Montenegro) Uroš Đuranović	Ħamrun Spartans	11
6	(Brazil) Pablo	Naxxar Lions	10
7	(Nigeria) Sunday Akinbule	Marsaxlokk	9
8	(Malta) Jurgen Degabriele	Hibernians	8
8	(Cape Verde) Luis Willis Alves Furtado	Floriana	8

==== Hat-tricks ====
Player	For	Against	Result	Stadium	Date
(Malta) Luke Montebello^{4}	Ħamrun Spartan	Balzan	7-1 (A)	Ta' Qali National Stadium, Ta' Qali	27 January 2024
(Australia) George Blackwood	Balzan	Sirens	4-1 (A)	Centenary Stadium, Ta' Qali	6 April 2024
(Brazil) Pablo	Naxxar Lions	Gudja United	4-2 (A)	Centenary Stadium, Ta' Qali	6 April 2024
(Ghana) Seth Paintsil^{4}	Ħamrun Spartan	Floriana	5-0 (A)	Ta' Qali National Stadium, Ta' Qali	27 April 2024

Notes

^{4} Player scored 4 goalss

=== Clean sheets ===
Rank	Player	Club	Clean sheets
1	(Bulgaria) Georgi Kitanov	Floriana	15
1	(Malta) Rashed Al-Tumi	Sliema Wanderers	15
3	(Poland) Marcel Zapytowski	Birkirkara	10
4	(Nigeria) Akpan David Udoh	Mosta	9
4	(Malta) Matthias Debono	Naxxar Lions	9
6	(Malta) Henry Bonello	Ħamrun Spartans	8
6	(Guinea) Ibrahim Koné	Hibernians	8
8	(Serbia) Danilo Golovic	Balzan	7
8	(Serbia) Marko Drobnjak	Marsaxlokk	7
8	(Brazil) Francisco Celio Da Paz Silva Filho	Santa Lucia	7

=== Discipline ===
==== Player ====
- Most yellow cards: 11
  - (Ghana) Evans Damian Aneni (Mosta)
- Most red cards: 2
  - (Ivory Coast) Ali Diakite (Birkirkara)

==== Club ====
- Most yellow cards: 66
  - Sliema Wanderers
- Most red cards: 6
  - Sliema Wanderers

=== Monthly awards ===
Month	Manager of the Month		Player of the Month	
Month	Manager	Club	Player	Club
September	(Italy) Mauro Camoranesi	Floriana	(Malta) Kemar Reid	Floriana
October	(Malta) George Vella	Naxxar Lions	(Malta) Luke Montebello	Hamrun Spartans
November	(Malta) George Vella	Naxxar Lions	No Winner	
December	(Malta) Paul Zammit	Sliema Wanderers	No Winner	
January	(Italy) Luciano Zauri	Hamrun Spartans	(Malta) Luke Montebello	Hamrun Spartans
February			(Malta) Luke Montebello	Hamrun Spartans
