= 2020–21 Maltese Premier League =

Maltese Premier League
- Season: 2020–21
- Dates: 11 September 2020 – 9 April 2021
- Champions: Ħamrun Spartans (8th title)
- Relegated: Żejtun; Tarxien; Lija; Senglea Athletic
- Champions League: Hibernians
- Europa Conference League: Gżira; Birkirkara; Mosta
- Matches: 184
- Goals: 552 (3 per match)
- Top goalscorer: Kevin Rosero (17)
- Biggest home win: Hibernians 8–1 Lija Athletic (25 October 2020); St. Lucia 7-0 Tarxien Rainbows (13 February 2021)
- Biggest away win: Senglea Athletic 0–5 Tarxien Rainbows (24 October 2020)
- Highest scoring: Hibernians 8–1 Lija Athletic (25 October 2020)
- Longest winning run: 6 matches Gżira United
- Longest unbeaten run: 13 matches Ħamrun Spartans
- Longest winless run: 18 matches Senglea Athletics
- Longest losing run: 9 matches Senglea Athletics
- Highest attendance: N/A
- Lowest attendance: N/A

The 2020–21 Maltese Premier League was the 106th season of the Maltese Premier League, the top-flight league football in Malta. Floriana were the defending champions, having won their 26th title the previous season.

On 10 March 2021, due to the outbreak of the COVID-19 pandemic in Malta, a decision was made by the Government of Malta to suspend all football activities in Malta for one month.

On 9 April, the season was abandoned due to the COVID-19 pandemic in Malta. Hamrun Spartans, who were top of the table at the time of the season's suspension, were declared the champions. Their first league title in exactly 30 years.

== Teams ==
Location of teams in 2020–21 Maltese Premier League

Sixteen teams will compete in the league which will include the two teams promoted from the First Division. The promoted teams are Żejtun Corinthians, who will be playing their first season in the top division, and Lija Athetlic.

Team	In league since	City	Training Stadium	Capacity
Balzan	2011	Balzan	St. Aloysius Sports and Recreational Complex	100
Birkirkara	1990	Birkirkara	Mgarr Ground	
Floriana	1986	Floriana	Independence Arena	
Gudja United	2019	Gudja	Louis Azzopardi Stadium	
Gżira United	2016	Gżira	Gzira Football Ground	
Ħamrun Spartans	2016	Ħamrun	Victor Tedesco Stadium	6,000
Hibernians	1945	Paola	Hibernians Ground	2,968
Lija Athletic	2020	Lija	Lija Stadium	500
Mosta	2011	Mosta	Charles Abela Memorial Stadium	600
St. Lucia	2019	Santa Luċija	Grawnd Santa Luċija	
Senglea Athletic	2017	Senglea	Corradino C	100
Sirens	2019	St. Paul's Bay	Sirens Stadium	600
Sliema Wanderers	1984	Sliema	Tigne Sports Complex	1,000
Tarxien Rainbows	2008	Tarxien	Tony Cassar Sports Ground	1,000
Valletta	1944	Valletta	Sirens Stadium	600
Żejtun Corinthians	2020	Żejtun		

== Venues ==
2020–21 Maltese Premier League is located in Malta	Ta' Qali	Ta' Qali	Paola
2020–21 Maltese Premier League is located in Malta	Ta' Qali National Stadium	Centenary Stadium	Tony Bezzina Stadium
2020–21 Maltese Premier League is located in Malta	Capacity: 16,997	Capacity: 3,000	Capacity: 2,968

=== Personnel and kits ===
Team	Manager	Kit manufacturer	Shirt sponsor
Balzan	(England) Mark Miller	Joma	Investors Mutual Limited
Birkirkara	(Netherlands) André Paus	Adidas	McDonald's
Floriana	(Malta) John Buttigieg	Joma	Scotts Supermarket, Boggi
Gudja United	(Malta) Cyril Buttigieg	Givova	All Nuts, Emilio Bilocca Handy Man
Gżira United	(Malta) Darren Abdilla	Puma	
Ħamrun Spartans	(Malta) Mark Buttigieg	Puma	J. Portelli Projects
Hibernians	(Italy) Stefano Sanderra	Joma	Bezzina
Lija Athletic	(Malta) Joseph Galea	Macron	The Falzon Group Of Companies
Mosta	(Croatia) Davor Filipović	Macron	Dimbros, Nilmar
Senglea Athletic	(Malta) Clive Mizzi	Givova	Palumbo
Sirens	(Italy) Giovanni Tedesco	Macron	Teamsport, Gillieru Harbour Hotel, Valyou Supermarket
Sliema Wanderers	(Italy) Andrea Pisanu	Jartazi	Catco Capital Investment, Catco Group Holding, Sixt, Sharjah
St. Lucia	(Malta) Oliver Spiteri	Macron	Multivend
Tarxien Rainbows	(Malta) Winston Muscat	Erreà	Cassar Ship Repairs
Valletta	(Portugal) Cardoso Mendes	Puma	Iniala
Żejtun Corinthians	(Nigeria) Orosco Anonam	Adidas	

- Additionally, referee kits are made by Macron, sponsored by TeamSports and FXDD.

=== Managerial changes ===
Team	Outgoing manager	Manner of departure	Date of vacancy	Position in table	Incoming manager	Date of appointment
Tarxien Rainbows	(Malta) Demis Paul Scerri	Resign	21 May 2020	Pre-season	(Malta) Winston Muscat	12 June 2020
Gudja United	(Malta) Josef Mansueto	Resign	21 May 2020	Pre-season	(Malta) Jesmond Zammit	16 June 2020
Gżira United	(Malta) Paul Zammit	Resign	29 May 2020	Pre-season	(Malta) Darren Abdilla	24 June 2020
Valletta	(Italy) Giovanni Tedesco	Resign	13 June 2020	Pre-season	(Malta) Jesmond Zerafa	18 June 2020
Mosta	(England) Mark Miller	Mutual consent	16 June 2020	Pre-season	(Croatia) Davor Filipović	21 June 2020
Balzan	(Malta) Ludvig Bartolo	End of caretaker	22 June 2020	Pre-season	(England) Mark Miller	22 June 2020
Valletta	(Malta) Jesmond Zerafa	Resign	30 November 2020	9th	(Portugal) Cardoso Mendes	28 December 2020
Sirens	(Malta) Steve D'Amato	Sacked	14 December 2020	11th	(Italy) Giovanni Tedesco	14 December 2020
Floriana	(Italy) Vincenzo Potenza	Resign	24 December 2020	10th	(Malta) John Buttigieg	25 December 2020

== League table ==
Pos	Team	Pld	W	D	L	GF	GA	GD	Pts	Qualification or relegation
1	Ħamrun Spartans (Note: Ħamrun Spartans were banned from competing in European competitions for a match fixing case dating back to 2013.) (C)	23	17	5	1	56	20	+36	56	
2	Hibernians	23	16	3	4	53	20	+33	51	Qualification for the Champions League first qualifying round
3	Gżira United	23	14	4	5	49	21	+28	46	Qualification for the Europa Conference League first qualifying round
4	Birkirkara	23	13	5	5	45	25	+20	44	Qualification for the Europa Conference League first qualifying round
5	Sliema Wanderers (Note: Sliema Wanderers failed to obtain a UEFA license.)	23	12	4	7	39	31	+8	40	
6	Mosta	23	10	6	7	41	36	+5	36	Qualification for the Europa Conference League first qualifying round
7	Valletta	23	9	6	8	27	35	−8	33	
8	St. Lucia	23	7	8	8	38	35	+3	29	
9	Sirens	23	7	7	9	27	35	−8	28	
10	Balzan	23	6	9	8	31	29	+2	27	
11	Gudja United	23	8	3	12	29	35	−6	27	
12	Floriana	23	7	6	10	26	34	−8	27	
13	Żejtun Corinthians (R)	23	6	6	11	28	40	−12	24	Relegation to the 2021–22 Maltese Challenge League
14	Tarxien Rainbows (R)	23	6	3	14	25	48	−23	21	Relegation to the 2021–22 Maltese Challenge League
15	Lija Athetlic (R)	23	5	5	13	25	46	−21	20	Relegation to the 2021–22 Maltese Challenge League
16	Senglea Athletic (R)	23	0	2	21	13	62	−49	2	Relegation to the 2021–22 Maltese Challenge League

Source: Malta Football Association
Rules for classification: 1) Points; 2) Play-offs (only if needed to decide champions, teams for relegation or teams for UEFA competitions).
(C) Champions; (R) Relegated

== Results ==
Home \ Away	BAL	BIR	FLO	GUD	GZI	HAM	HIB	LIJ	MOS	SEN	SIR	SLI	SLC	TAR	VAL	ZEJ
Balzan	—	—	0–0	—	0–2	2–2	—	1–0	4–1	1–1	1–0	5–1	1–1	0–1	0–1	3–1
Birkirkara	2–2	—	2–0	3–0	1–1	0–2	—	4–1	0–3	—	—	1–2	—	3–0	2–0	2–3
Floriana	0–0	2–5	—	1–0	2–1	—	1–1	1–2	0–2	1–0	3–2	0–1	1–1	—	—	0–0
Gudja United	3–2	—	1–2	—	0–3 (Note: Gżira United were awarded a 3–0 win after the Malta Football Association's Protests Board upheld their protest. Originally, the match ended in a 1–1 draw.)	0–1	1–4	2–0	0–1	—	1–3	1–1	—	0–2	0–0	0–1
Gżira United	—	—	4–1	—	—	1–2	0–1	1–0	6–1	4–0	—	3–2	2–2	1–1	2–0	2–1
Ħamrun Spartans	3–2	0–2	3–1	3–1	2–2	—	1–0	—	3–1	3–0	5–1	—	2–2	5–0	—	4–0
Hibernians	2–1	0–1	3–1	—	—	2–2	—	8–1	2–0	3–0	1–2	1–0	—	2–0	1–1	2–0
Lija Athetlic	1–1	0–0	—	0–1	0–3	2–2	0–5	—	1–1	4–0	0–2	—	3–1	2–0	1–2	—
Mosta	3–3	0–1	—	2–2	1–2	—	2–3	—	—	5–1	0–0	—	1–0	1–0	2–2	3–0
Senglea Athletic	—	1–2	0–2	0–2	—	0–1	—	1–3	1–3	—	0–1	0–2	—	0–5	1–3	1–1
Sirens	—	2–4	2–1	—	1–0	0–1	—	1–1	2–2	—	—	0–0	0–2	2–2	0–1	0–4
Sliema Wanderers	3–1	2–2	—	1–2	2–0	0–2	3–1	4–1	1–3	3–1	1–3	—	3–1	—	—	—
St. Lucia	—	0–0	2–1	3–2	—	1–4	0–3	3–2	2–3	4–1	—	0–1	—	7–0	1–1	1–1
Tarxien Rainbows	0–1	0–3	2–2	0–5	0–2	—	0–1	—	—	4–2	3–1	1–2	0–2	—	3–1	—
Valletta	1–0	4–2	0–3	2–4	1–3	0–3	1–4	—	—	2–1	1–1	0–0	1–0	—	—	2–1
Żejtun Corinthians	0–0	0–3	—	0–1	0–4	—	2–3	2–0	—	3–1	1–1	2–4	2–2	3–1		—

Source: Malta Football Association
Legend: Blue = home team win; Yellow = draw; Red = away team win.
For upcoming matches, an "a" indicates there is an article about the rivalry between the two participants.

== Season statistics ==
=== Top goalscorers ===
As of 10 March 2021

Rank	Player	Club	Goals
1	(Colombia) Kevin Rosero	St. Lucia	17
2	(Montenegro) Bojan Kaljević	Mosta	14
3	(Cape Verde) Dodô	Ħamrun Spartans	13
3	(Malta) Luke Montebello	Birkirkara	13
3	(Nigeria) Franklin Sasere	Ħamrun Spartans	13
6	(Malta) Jean Paul Farrugia	Sliema Wanderers	12
6	(Malta) Jake Grech	Hibernians	12
8	(Malta) Jurgen Degabriele	Hibernians	11
8	(Brazil) Maxuell	Gżira United	11
10	(Brazil) Yuri	Gudja United	10
10	(Slovenia) Vito Plut	Tarxien Rainbows	10

=== Red Cards ===
Rank	Club	Most Red Cards
1	Gżira United	7
2	Senglea Athletic	6
2	Sirens	6
2	Valletta	6
5	Sliema Wanderers	5
5	Żejtun Corinthians	5
7	Balzan	4
7	St. Lucia	4
9	Gudja United	3
9	Mosta	3
11	Birkirkara	2
11	Floriana	2
11	Ħamrun Spartans	2
11	Hibernians	2
11	Lija Athletic	2
