= Jimmy Briffa =

Maltese footballer and manager

Personal information
- Full name: Jimmy Briffa
- Date of birth: 23 September 1948 (age 78)
- Place of birth: Mqabba, Malta
- Position: Defender

Senior career*
Years	Team	Apps	(Gls)
1964-1965	Mqabba Ħajduks		
1965-1966	Floriana		
1966-1967	Mqabba Ħajduks		
1967-1969	Żejtun Corinthians		
1969-1976	Sliema Wanderers	52	(0)
1977-1979	Msida Saint-Joseph	31	(1)
1979-1986	Mqabba Ħajduks		

International career
1972	Malta	4	(0)

Managerial career
- 1989-1990: Żurrieq
- 1990–1993: Balzan Youths
- 1993-1994: Mqabba Ħajduks
- 1995–1996: Marsaxlokk
- Luxol St. Andrews
- 2002-2003: Żurrieq
- 2003–2005: Balzan Youths
- 2005: Floriana
- 2005-2007: Lija Athletic
- 2007–2008: Marsa
- 2008–2009: Senglea Athletic
- 2009-2010: Qrendi
- Siġġiewi
- Tarxien Rainbows
- * Club domestic league appearances and goals

Jimmy Briffa (born 23 September 1948, in Malta) was a professional footballer and manager. During his career, he played as a defender for the Sliema Wanderers. He later went on to coach Balzan Youths, Marsaxlokk, Floriana, Marsa, Qrendi and Senglea Athletic.

== International career ==
Briffa made his debut for Malta in a March 1972 friendly match away against Algeria and also played in three World Cup qualification matches that year.
