= Jurgen Degabriele =

Maltese professional footballer

Personal information
- Full name: Jurgen Degabriele
- Date of birth: 10 October 1996 (age 30)
- Place of birth: Pietà, Malta
- Position: Striker

Team information
- Current team: Hibernians
- Number: 10

Youth career
- –2013: Hibernians

Senior career*
| Years | Team | Apps | (Gls) |
| 2013– | Hibernians | 276 | (104) |

International career^{‡}
| 2013 | Malta U17 | 3 | (1) |
| 2014–2015 | Malta U19 | 6 | (1) |
| 2017–2019 | Malta U21 | 14 | (1) |
| 2018– | Malta | 28 | (7) |
- * Club domestic league appearances and goals as of 18 May 2026 ‡ National team caps and goals as of 19 November 2024

Jurgen Degabriele (born 10 October 1996) is a Maltese professional footballer who plays as a forward for Maltese Premier League side Hibernians and the Malta national football team.

== Club career ==
Jurgen Degabriele grew through the Hibernians youth system. At age 14, he had a trial with Triestina.

He attracted interest from Calcio Padova, being involved in a friendly during a trial. However, he refused to join them, claiming to have been ignored and mistreated throughout his trial. In 2016, he signed a five-year contract with the Hibernians senior side.

Degabriele established himself as an up-and-coming important player for Hibernians, playing a part in the club's winning of the 2016–17 Premier League.

On 18 May 2018, Degabriele bagged four goals and condemned Lija Athletic to relegation.

== International career ==
Degabriele was part of the Malta youth squads, namely the under-17, under-19 and under-21.

Upon being promoted as national team manager, Ray Farrugia called up Degabriele to the senior squad, amongst other players, for a training camp in Austria. Degabriele's first match with the Malta national football team was against Armenia in a 1–1 draw.

== Career statistics ==
Statistics accurate as of match played 19 April 2024.

Appearances and goals by club, season and competition
| Club | Season | League | | | Maltese Cup | | Europe | | Super Cup | | Total | |
| Club | Season | Division | Apps | Goals | Apps | Goals | Apps | Goals | Apps | Goals | Apps | Goals |
|---|---|---|---|---|---|---|---|---|---|---|---|---|
| Hibernians | 2013-14 | Maltese Premier League | 13 | 2 | 1 | 0 | 0 | 0 | 0 | 0 | 14 | 2 |
| Hibernians | 2014-15 | Maltese Premier League | 22 | 3 | 2 | 0 | 2 | 0 | 0 | 0 | 26 | 3 |
| Hibernians | 2015-16 | Maltese Premier League | 27 | 7 | 1 | 0 | 0 | 0 | 0 | 0 | 28 | 7 |
| Hibernians | 2016-17 | Maltese Premier League | 33 | 16 | 0 | 0 | 1 | 0 | 0 | 0 | 34 | 16 |
| Hibernians | 2017-18 | Maltese Premier League | 26 | 11 | 1 | 2 | 4 | 0 | 1 | 0 | 32 | 13 |
| Hibernians | 2018-19 | Maltese Premier League | 18 | 5 | 1 | 0 | 0 | 0 | 0 | 0 | 19 | 5 |
| Hibernians | 2019–20 | Maltese Premier League | 7 | 3 | 1 | 0 | 0 | 0 | 0 | 0 | 8 | 3 |
| Hibernians | 2020–21 | Maltese Premier League | 23 | 11 | 2 | 1 | 2 | 2 | 0 | 0 | 27 | 14 |
| Hibernians | 2021–22 | Maltese Premier League | 26 | 14 | 4 | 0 | 6 | 4 | 0 | 0 | 36 | 18 |
| Hibernians | 2022–23 | Maltese Premier League | 25 | 15 | 3 | 1 | 6 | 1 | 1 | 0 | 35 | 17 |
| Hibernians | 2023–24 | Maltese Premier League | 23 | 8 | 2 | 1 | 0 | 0 | 0 | 0 | 25 | 9 |
| Career total | | | 243 | 95 | 18 | 5 | 21 | 7 | 2 | 0 | 284 | 107 |

Appearances and goals by national team and year
| National team | Year | Apps | Goals |
|---|---|---|---|
| Malta | 2018 | 2 | 0 |
| Malta | 2019 | 0 | 0 |
| Malta | 2020 | 6 | 2 |
| Malta | 2021 | 2 | 1 |
| Malta | 2022 | 12 | 3 |
| Malta | 2023 | 3 | 0 |
| Malta | 2024 | 3 | 1 |
| Total | | 28 | 7 |

=== International goals ===
Scores and results list Malta's goal tally first.

| No | Date | Venue | Opponent | Score | Result | Competition |
|---|---|---|---|---|---|---|
| 1. | 3 September 2020 | Tórsvøllur, Tórshavn, Faroe Islands | Faroe Islands | 1–1 | 2–3 | 2020–21 UEFA Nations League D |
| 2. | 14 November 2020 | National Stadium, Ta' Qali, Malta | Andorra | 2–1 | 3–1 | 2020–21 UEFA Nations League D |
| 3. | 11 October 2021 | AEK Arena – Georgios Karapatakis, Larnaca, Cyprus | Cyprus | 2–2 | 2–2 | 2022 FIFA World Cup qualification |
| 4. | 25 March 2022 | National Stadium, Ta' Qali, Malta | Azerbaijan | 1–0 | 1–0 | Friendly |
| 5. | 9 June 2022 | National Stadium, Ta' Qali, Malta | Estonia | 1–1 | 1–2 | 2022–23 UEFA Nations League D |
| 6. | 17 November 2022 | National Stadium, Ta' Qali, Malta | Greece | 1–1 | 2–2 | Friendly |
| 7. | 14 November 2024 | National Stadium, Ta' Qali, Malta | Liechtenstein | 1–0 | 2–0 | Friendly |

== Honours ==
=== Club ===
Hibernians

- Maltese Premier League: 2014–15, 2016–17, 2021–22

=== Individual ===
- Best Youth League Player: 2015–16
- Best Young Player: 2017
- Best Young Forward: 2017
