= 2013–14 Maltese Third Division =

Maltese Third Division
- Season: 2013–14
- Champions: Sirens
- Top goalscorer: Giovanni Galea
- Longest unbeaten run: Sirens F.C. (24 Games)
- Highest attendance: Sirens F.C.
- Lowest attendance: Ta' Xbiex F.C.
- Average attendance: Attard F.C.

The 2013–14 Maltese Third Division (also known as 2013–14 BOV 3rd Division due to sponsorship reasons) began on 12 September 2013 and ended on 27 April 2014.

The game enden with Sirens F.C. maintaining a dramatic draw in the last minute goal against Swieqi United F.C. The blues left the league with an unbeaten record in the 2013-14 Maltese Third Division that made a big honour to them, on the other hand 3 teams were promoted to the Maltese Second Division that were the 2nd place Swieqi United F.C., the 3rd place Ghaxaq F.C. and the 4th place Xghajra Tornadoes F.C.

The biggest win was for Sirens F.C. as they crashed Kalkara F.C. an unbeatable score of 11–0. The greens were humiliated by that score that they let the blues unbeaten in the league.

The most teams that had attendance in the league were Attard F.C., Xghajra Tornadoes F.C. and the champions Sirens F.C. The most attendance was taken by the blue champions as 1,406 supporters attended.

== Participating teams ==
- Sirens F.C.
- Swieqi United
- Santa Lucija
- Ghaxaq F.C.
- Xghajra Tornadoes
- Attard F.C.
- Mgarr United
- Mtarfa F.C.
- Marsaxlokk F.C.
- Luqa St. Andrew's
- Qrendi F.C.
- Ta' Xbiex
- Kalkara F.C.
