= Floriana–Valletta rivalry =

Rivalry match between Valletta FC and Floriana FC

Valletta F.C. v Floriana F.C.
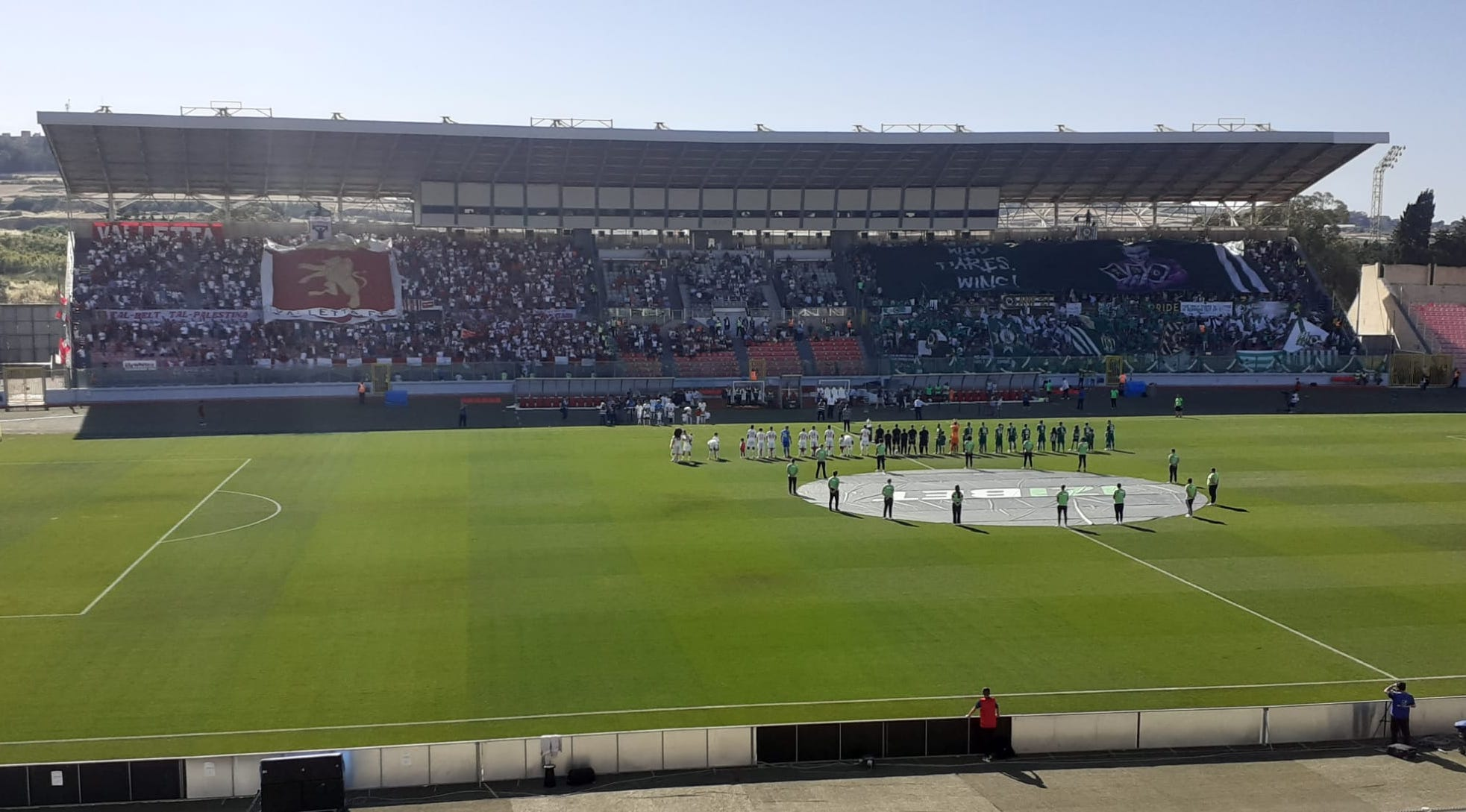
- Other names: Valletta-Floriana rivalry The Derby of the Lions (Maltese: Id-Derbi tal-Iljuni); The Derby of the Capital (Maltese: Derbi tal-Kapitali); Il-Belt u l-Furjana; The Derby of the Bastions (Maltese: Id-Derbi ta' wara s-swar)
- Location: Valletta and Floriana
- Teams: Valletta F.C. v Floriana F.C.
- Stadiums: National Stadium, Ta' Qali; Empire Stadium, Gżira

Statistics
- Most wins: Valletta F.C. (105 Wins)
- Largest victory: Floriana 6–0 Valletta (19 March 1950); Valletta 6–0 Floriana (22 December 1962); Valletta 6–0 Floriana (29 August 2009)
- Largest goal scoring: Floriana 6–1 Valletta (10 April 1955)

The rivalry between Valletta F.C. and Floriana F.C. is a notable one in Maltese football as both clubs are recognised for having great history and traditions, and moreover, the respective localities of Valletta, the capital city of Malta and Floriana, its immediate suburb, are adjacent to each other.

The rivalry is characterised by a tight head-to-head tally in terms of the Maltese Premier League, with Valletta having won 25 competitions, and Floriana having won 26.

== Sporting and cultural rivalry ==
The Floriana–Valletta derby is one of the largest derby matches in Malta.

Although the rivalry is mostly a sporting one, there have been cases where this has seeped through to other aspects. In 1922, a Floriana gang had pulled a tram off its tracks, overturned it and attacked the Valletta fans inside with stones, which led to The Malta Police Force re-routing traffic of Valletta fans away from the main streets of Floriana upon returning from the stadium ever since. Floriana are known to request police presence when the derby is played at any level. In fact, Valletta acquired the nickname Tal-Palestina during the 1970s, referring to the troublemaking as if straight out of the Israeli–Palestinian conflict.

The Floriana club traces its roots earlier than those of Valletta, and therefore this has been the envy of many Valletta supporters, who were more successful pre-World War II. Eventually, Valletta gained more sporting success post-war. Due to the close association that Valletta had with the British Navy and the presence of a red-light district in Strada Stretta in the first half of the 20th century, various rivals suggest a potential link to prostitution and unknown paternity, leading to Floriana supporters chanting Min hu missierkom, il-Beltin? (Maltese: Who's your father, Valletta citizens?)

During the 2009–10 Maltese Premier League, a television crew from Manchester United following Jordi Cruyff, who was plying his trade with Valletta for his final professional season, commented that the derby was one of the most powerful games they had ever featured.

In 2011, Nigel Holland, then Mayor of Floriana, argued that there may be rivalry in local government, when it came to which of the two localities should host the national New Year's Eve celebrations.

== 2010–11 season ==
In 2011, Valletta and Floriana were finalists of the 2010–11 Maltese FA Trophy. Valletta were league champions that season, and Floriana came in at close second. This provided an electrifying setting for the last match of the season.

Floriana won the match with a goal late in the game from Ivan Woods. Upon the final whistle, Floriana attacking midfielder Christian Cassar reportedly provoked supporters and club officials by celebrating at the Valletta side. Valletta striker Terence Scerri pushed the Floriana player, an action which received a red card. Valletta president Victor Sciriha condemned violence but also hoped that anyone who provoked is also charged.

Prior to the match, then Floriana president Johann Said allegedly accused Valletta president Victor Sciriha of allegedly attempting to bribe Floriana F.C. individuals. Sciriha demanded an apology through a legal letter sent to Said, refuting the claims.

== 2012–13 season ==
Riccardo Gaucci brought then unknown Brazilian striker Igor Coronado to the club, whom he had personally noticed at Aylesbury United F.C.

== 2013–14 season ==
In the second half of the season, Riccardo Gaucci confirmed his presidency of Floriana Football Club, leading a consortium to beat another consortium represented by Dubai-based Medi Tozar on behalf of Englishman Mike Farnan. Gaucci and Farnan were head-to-had in the first vote that the members took in an Extraordinary General Meeting, tying at 93 each, however in a second vote, Gaucci received 162 votes out of the 180 present. Gaucci promised an investment in the pitches owned by the club, namely the Independence Arena, which was valued between €14 and €18 million.

Gaucci assured that he didn't move to Floriana to misappropriate funds, but instead he wanted to continue his footballing experience. Being mid-way through the season, Footballing departments could not be strengthened immediately, however, Gaucci bolstered the club's Medical Department. He outlined that the transfer policy would not be to attract highly paid stars but realistic targets who could contribute wholeheartedly to the club.

== 2015–16 season ==
Valletta emerged victorious as they had managed to maintain consistency throughout the whole campaign. Victor Sciriha was less vocal, and yet he acted even more wisely in investing resources. His boldest move was to return Paul Zammit at the helm of the senior squad. On the pitch, Federico Falcone's goals were crucial to this consistency.

== 2016–17 season ==
Floriana won the first round derby by winning 2–0 with goals from Amadou Samb and Mario Fontanella. The second round derby ended in a stalemate with Valletta and Floriana drawing 0–0.

== 2018–19 season ==
Both Valletta and Floriana started the season with a defeat.

Floriana won the third round derby with two goals, from Brandon Paiber and Kristian Keqi. In light of this win, president Gaucci commented how on important the derby is to help bring the fans closer to the club, and declared that he had big plans for the seasons to come.

The Greens had a disappointing season, finishing 8th in the 2018–19 Maltese Premier League. The third-round encounter may have slowed Valletta's progress however they still managed to seal their 25th title, matching Floriana.

== 2019–20 season ==
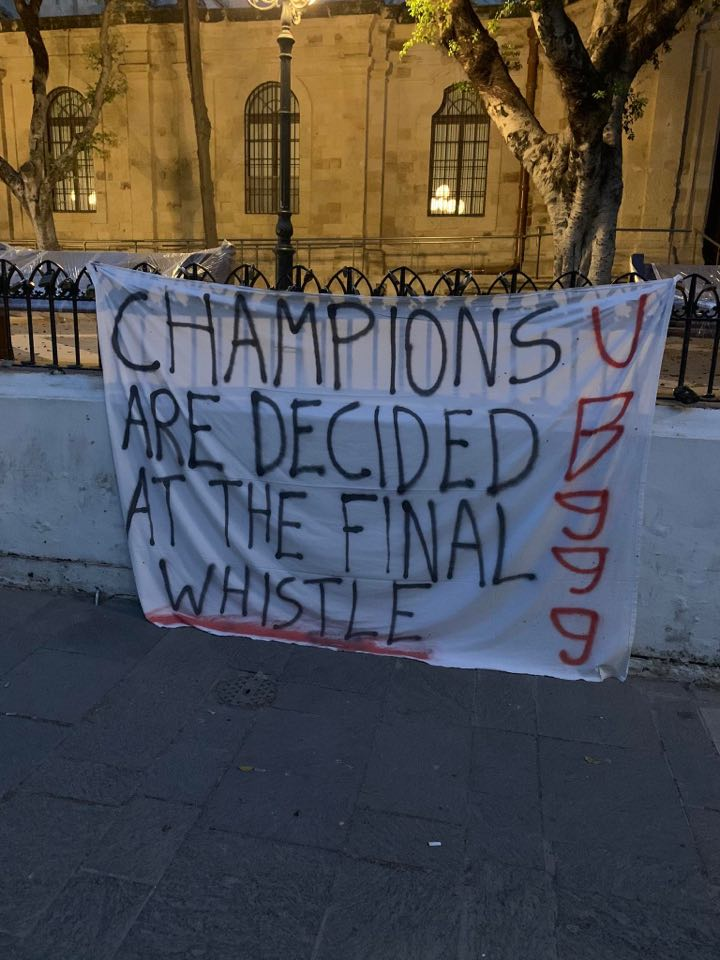
Banner hoisted by Valletta fan group, Ultras Beltin 999, in support of their mother club's political will to continue playing the final 6 matches.

In the 2019–20 Maltese Premier League, Floriana immediately emerged as the main challengers of Valletta, winning two direct encounters right at the start of the season (against Birkirkara F.C. and Balzan F.C.). Indeed, Valletta spoiled Floriana's plans by matching Kristian Keqi's goal with an equaliser in added time scored by Enmy Peña. Before COVID-19, the last derby was played on February 2, 2020, with Steve Borg heading a freekick by Triston Caruana into the Floriana net.

The rivalry intensified in 2020, when the Premier League was suspended abruptly due to the COVID-19 pandemic in Malta. On May 18, 2020, the MFA Executive Committee decided to prematurely terminate the league competition and the ongoing FA Trophy competition. Floriana topped the standings with 41 points at the time the league was halted.

Valletta, were on the forefront of a small movement that claimed that the league should resume on the pitch, by proposing dates to the Malta Football Association.

Eventually, Valletta, together with Birkirkara F.C. and Gżira United F.C., wrote to the Prime Minister of Malta Robert Abela.

Floriana president Riccardo Gaucci, claimed that the Greens deserved to be assigned the championship given that their performances on the pitch merit this. Then Floriana coach Vincenzo Potenza suggested that since their position was first before the league was stopped, then this proved that Floriana should be rewarded the championship.

On 25 May, Floriana were awarded the championship after a vote taken by the MFA council, their 26th title and surpassing Valletta in the all-time champions list.

Valletta F.C. president Victor Sciriha argued that the questions were tailor-made in order that they would be voted in favour, due to the agenda of top officials of the Malta Football Association, mainly Bjorn Vassallo and Matthew Paris (the latter being a former Secretary General of Floriana F.C.), claiming that this gerrymandering was on their part to ensure victory for Floriana.

== Honours ==
Team	Maltese Premier League	Maltese First Division	Maltese FA Trophy	Maltese Super Cup	Total
Floriana F.C.	26	1	21	2	50
Valletta F.C.	25	1	14	13	53
Combined	51	2	35	15	103
