= Investors Mutual Limited =

Australian asset management limited company

Investors Mutual
- Type: Private company
- Industry: Mutual fund
- Founded: May 1998
- Founder: Anton Tagliaferro
- Headquarters: Sydney, Australia
- Key people: Anton Tagliaferro, Hugh Giddy, Simon Conn
- Owner: Anton Tagliaferro; Natixis Global Asset Management; IML investment team
- Number of employees: 30+ (2015)
- Website: iml.com.au

Investors Mutual Limited (IML) is an Australian asset management limited company, established by Anton Tagliaferro in May 1998. The firm specializes in Australian equities and serves both retail and institutional investors through a conservative value-based investment style with a long-term perspective. As at December 2019, the company had over $9 billion in funds under management and its flagship and largest fund is the $2.6 billion IML Australian Share Fund.

== History ==
In October 2017, Natixis Global Asset Management acquired 50% of IML.

== Funds ==
In June 1998, IML launched the Australian Share Fund.

In December 1999, IML formed a partnership with a subsidiary of Bendigo Bank, Sandhurst Trustees Limited:

On 22 August 2014, IML established QV Equities Limited ASX code: QVE), a listed investment company.
