= Jonathan Holland (footballer) =

Maltese footballer (born 1978)

Personal information
- Date of birth: 15 July 1978 (age 48)
- Place of birth: Pietà, Malta
- Position: Midfielder

Senior career*
Years	Team	Apps	(Gls)
1994–2004	Floriana	182	(31)
2004–2005	Bradford Park Avenue		
2005–2007	Birkirkara	27	(1)
2007–2008	Nairn County	15	(7)
2008–2009	Birkirkara	15	(0)
2009–2011	Ħamrun Spartans	14	(0)
2011–2012	Pietà Hotspurs		

International career
1999–2003	Malta	18	(0)

Managerial career
- 2014–2019: Ħamrun Spartans (assistant)
- 2016: Ħamrun Spartans (caretaker)
- 2018–2019: Marsaxlokk
- 2019–2022: Birkirkara (assistant)
- 2022: Birkirkara (caretaker)
- * Club domestic league appearances and goals

Jonathan Holland (born 15 July 1978) is a Maltese former professional footballer who played as a midfielder. He has served as the caretaker manager of Birkirkara.

== Playing career ==
Holland was born in Pietà, Malta. He made his debut with Floriana in the Maltese Premier League in the 1994–95 season. After ten seasons with Floriana, in 2005 he joined Birkirkara. Holland also had spells with National League side, Bradford Park Avenue.

He also appeared 18 times for the Malta national team, debuting on 28 April 1999 in a 2–1 defeat against Iceland.

== Career statistics ==
Season	Team	Matches	Goals
1994–1995	Floriana	5	1
1995–1996	Floriana	11	1
1996–1997	Floriana	22	7
1997–1998	Floriana	14	3
1998–1999	Floriana	17	1
1999–2000	Floriana	24	3
2000–2001	Floriana	24	1
2001–2002	Floriana	23	4
2002–2003	Floriana	22	5
2003–2004	Floriana	20	5
2004–2005	Bradford Park Avenue	-	-
2005–2006	Birkirkara	12	0
2006–2007	Birkirkara	15	1
2007–2008	Nairn County	15	7
