= Tescoma =

Czech kitchenware manufacturer

- Type: Private limited company
- Industry: Consumer goods
- Founded: 1992
- Founders: Petr Chmela; Jiří Vaculík
- Headquarters: Zlín, Czech Republic
- Area served: Worldwide
- Products: Kitchenware, household goods and small appliances
- Revenue: CZK 1.441 billion (2024)
- Net income: CZK 53 million (2024)
- Number of employees: 562 (2024)
- Parent: Tescoma Invest, a.s.
- Website: www.tescoma.cz
- Footnotes; Financial and employment figures refer to Czech TESCOMA s.r.o.

Tescoma is a Czech manufacturer of kitchenware and household goods based in Zlín. It was founded in 1992 by Petr Chmela and Jiří Vaculík. Its range includes cookware, kitchen utensils, food-storage containers and small kitchen appliances. The company sells internationally through branded shops, other retailers and online stores.

The company develops and tests kitchenware at its own development and design centre in Zlín. Its products have received international design awards, including the Red Dot Design Award and German Design Award.

== History ==
Petr Chmela and Jiří Vaculík founded Tescoma in Zlín in 1992. The two had met at a conservatory and played together in a band. Tescoma began by selling water-saving devices. In 1994, it started commissioning kitchen utensils sold under its own brand. Chmela was responsible for sales and marketing, and Vaculík for product development and design.

The company opened a branch in Slovakia in 1993, and an Italian branch followed in the mid-1990s. Italy became an important market and a base for international distribution. When Tesco entered the Czech market in 1996, it objected to the similarity of the companies' names. They reached an agreement and in the end, Tesco began selling Tescoma products.

Tescoma first bought products from other suppliers and later began designing its own kitchenware. It worked with outside designers before setting up its own development and design centre in Zlín in the early 2000s. The Tescoma World logistics centre opened in 2002. A testing laboratory was established in cooperation with the Institute for Testing and Certification in 2006. The company then developed a network of branded shops and launched its first online store in 2009.

== Products ==
Tescoma sells cookware, kitchen utensils, knives, baking equipment and food-storage containers. It also offers small kitchen appliances, including kettles, mixers and coffee machines, alongside storage and cleaning products for the home.

Several products have won design awards. The TEO glass teapot received a Red Dot award in 2013, followed by the MINERAL ceramic knife range, designed by Petr Tesák, in 2026.
