= FXDD =

American foreign exchange company

- Type: Private
- Industry: Financial services
- Founded: 2002
- Headquarters: New York City, United States
- Key people: Joseph Botkier, CEO
- Services: Foreign Exchange (Forex, FX), Precious Metals Trading, FX Options
- Website: www.fxdd.com

FXDirectDealer, LLC (known as FXDD) is a provider of foreign exchange trading for retail and institutional clients. The company provides access to the spot foreign exchange market through proprietary and third-party trading software, including: MetaTrader 4, FXDD Swordfish, PowerTrader, VikingTrader, Mirror Trader, and JForex.

== History ==
FXDD was founded in New York City in 2002 by its sister company Tradition (North America, Inc.), a division of Compagnie Financiere Tradition and Advanced Technologies Group Ltd.

The company formerly ran its operations out of Tradition’s headquarters at 75 Park Place, NY. In 2016, the Company moved to Newport tower in Jersey City.

In May 7, 2014, FXCM announced it acquired U.S. retail Forex Accounts of FXDD.

== Operations ==
FXDD Malta, LTD, founded in 2010, is a separate entity regulated by the Malta Financial Services Authority, which provides its clients with access to the spot foreign exchange, fx options, binary options, and precious metals markets.

== Instruments ==
FXDD began its operations as a retail spot foreign exchange dealer. The company offers trading in the Major currency pairs, cross pairs, emerging market pairs, gold, silver, and oil. As of August 2013, FXDD offers trading in 32 currency pairs, including the USD/CNY, USD/CNH, USD/MXN, USD/INR, and USD/KRW.

FXDD Malta, LTD, the European company, offers spot Forex trading in 32 currency pairs, as well as vanilla options trading, and binary options trading.

== Sponsorships ==
FXDD’s first sports sponsorship was the New York Rangers. The company signed to be a sponsor in 2009.

In 2010, FXDD partnered with the Formula 1 Red Bull Racing Team.

In 2010, FXDD sponsored the FXDD Mazda-RX8 driven by Emil Assentato and Jeffrey Segal. The car won the 2010 GRAND-AM Rolex Sports Car Series Championship.

FXDD unveiled the all-new AIM Autosport Team FXDD Ferrari 458 Italia GT Grand Am during the 2012 series. The FXDD Ferrari 458 Italia GT Grand Am showcased the FXDD brand colors and logo on its hood and doors. Driven by Emil Assentato and Jeffrey Segal, the team won the 2012 Rolex GT Series Championship.

FXDD sponsored the student-run cycling club at the Massachusetts Institute of Technology from 2006 to 2015.

FXDD Malta Ltd sponsored the Malta national soccer team in 2012.
