= 1984–85 Maltese Premier League =

Maltese Premier League
- Season: 1984–85
- Champions: Rabat Ajax F.C. (1st title)
- Relegated: Floriana F.C. Marsa F.C.
- European Cup: Rabat Ajax F.C.
- European Cup Winners' Cup: Żurrieq F.C.
- UEFA Cup: Hamrun Spartans F.C.
- Matches played: 52
- Goals scored: 117 (2.25 per match)

The 1984–85 Maltese Premier League was the 5th season of the Maltese Premier League, and the 70th season of top-tier football in Malta. It was contested by 8 teams, and Rabat Ajax F.C. won the championship.

The season saw the relegation of Floriana F.C., one of the most historic teams in Maltese football, for the first time in their history.

== Teams ==
Locations of the 1984–85 Maltese Premier League teams

== League standings ==
Pos	Team	Pld	W	D	L	GF	GA	GD	Pts	Qualification
1	Rabat Ajax F.C. (C)	13	5	7	1	19	12	+7	17	Qualification for the European Cup
2	Ħamrun Spartans F.C.	13	4	8	1	18	8	+10	16	Qualification for the UEFA Cup
3	Sliema Wanderers F.C.	13	5	5	3	13	10	+3	15	
4	Valletta F.C.	13	6	2	5	18	15	+3	14	
5	Żurrieq F.C.	13	5	4	4	18	14	+4	14	Qualification for the European Cup Winners' Cup (Note: Zurrieq qualified for the Cup Winners' Cup as Maltese FA Trophy Winners)
6	Hibernians F.C.	13	5	4	4	14	12	+2	14	
7	Floriana F.C. (R)	13	4	5	4	11	11	0	13	Relegation
8	Marsa F.C. (R)	13	0	1	12	6	35	−29	1	Relegation

Source: rsssf.com
(C) Champions; (R) Relegated

== Results ==
Home \ Away	FRN	HIB	ĦMR	MRS	RBT	SLM	VLT	ŻRQ
Floriana	—	2–1	0–0	1–0	0–1	1–2	2–0	0–0
Hibernians	– (Note: The games of the 6th round Hibernians–Floriana, Ħamrun Spartans–Rabat Ajax, Marsa–Valletta and Sliema Wanderers–Żurrieq were not played or rescheduled due to a players' strike.)	—	0–0	1–0	1–1	0–2	2–0	2–1
Ħamrun Spartans	1–1	2–1	—	3–0	–	1–1	0–0	1–2
Marsa	0–2	1–3	0–4	—	1–1	1–3	–	2–5
Rabat Ajax	3–1	1–1	2–2	3–0	—	1–1	2–0	0–0
Sliema Wanderers	0–0	1–0	0–0	2–1	0–0	—	1–2	–
Valletta	2–0	0–0	1–4	5–0	3–1	2–0	—	3–1
Żurrieq	1–1	1–2	0–0	2–0	2–3	1–0	2–0	—

Legend: Blue = home team win; Yellow = draw; Red = away team win.
