= Malta National Aquarium =

Aquarium in Qawra, Malta

Coordinates: 35°57′30″N 14°25′22″E

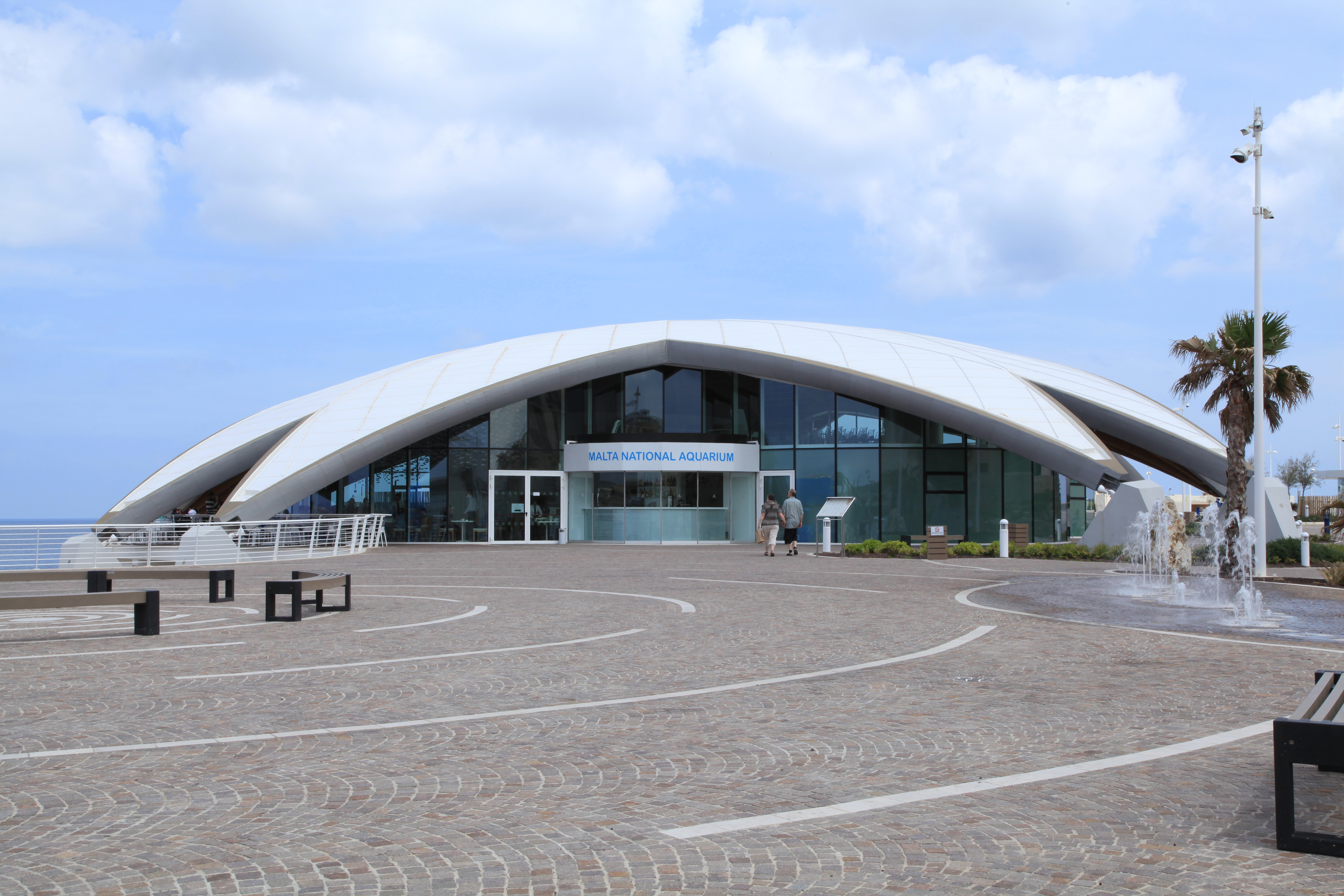
- Main entrance of the Aquarium
- Interactive map of Malta National Aquarium
- Date opened: October 1, 2013
- Location: Triq it-Trunciera, Qawra (San Pawl il-Baħar), Malta
- Floor space: 20,000 m^{2} (220,000 sq ft)
- No. of species: More than 175
- Major exhibits: Different species of Fishes, molluscs, reptiles and insects
- Director: Daniel de Castro
- Management: Malta Tourism Authority
- Public transit: Ben bus stop
- Website: www.aquarium.com.mt

The Malta National Aquarium (Maltese: Akkwarju Nazzjonali ta' Malta) is the largest aquarium in Malta.

It is located in Qawra, in the northern part of the island of Malta, and it hosts more than 175 different species of various animals, including fish, mollusca, reptiles and insects.

== History ==
The project for the creation of a National Aquarium site in Malta dates back to 1993. The town of Qawra was eventually preferred to the original idea of building it near Marsascala, being more easily accessible by tourists and closer to Bugibba and San Pawl il-Baħar, at the time lacking in tourist accommodation facilities.

The building of the site was financed with help from the European Union (about 49%) and it was inaugurated in October 2013, two years after the building was started.

== Description ==
The building, whose shape resembles a stylized starfish, is located on the Qawra seafront and it is equipped with some recreational facilities for children and a restaurant.

The Aquarium has 51 tanks on display with over 250 species, including those native to the Mediterranean, but also some from other parts of the world. Among these are freshwater and saltwater fish, jellyfish, reptiles, amphibians and insects. The main tank, 12 meters in diameter, allows the visitor to walk under a special gallery and to see the marine species inside from below.

In addition to fishes and mollusca, the site also hosts a terrarium with several tanks containing reptiles, amphibians (frogs, chameleons and snakes among others) and exotic invertebrates.

The Aquarium is one of the most visited tourist attractions in Malta, and it has contributed to the increase in visitors from abroad in recent years. Among the species housed in the Aquarium there are, among others, specimens of cat sharks, clown fish, octopuses and different types of jellyfish, housed in special thematic tanks.

In 2020, due to the temporary closure of the site caused by the spread of the COVID-19 pandemic in Malta, maintenance and expansion works were undertaken on the site.

== See also ==
- List of aquaria
- San Pawl il-Baħar
