= Harmont & Blaine =

Italian clothing firm

- Company type: Private
- Industry: Fashion
- Founded: 1986; 40 years ago Naples, Italy
- Founder: Domenico Menniti, Enzo Menniti, Paolo Montefusco, Massimo Montefusco
- Key people: Paolo Montefusco (President); Marco Pirone (CEO)
- Number of employees: About 600 (2019)

Harmont & Blaine is an Italian firm based in Naples which produces, sells and distributes upper-casual clothing.

== History ==
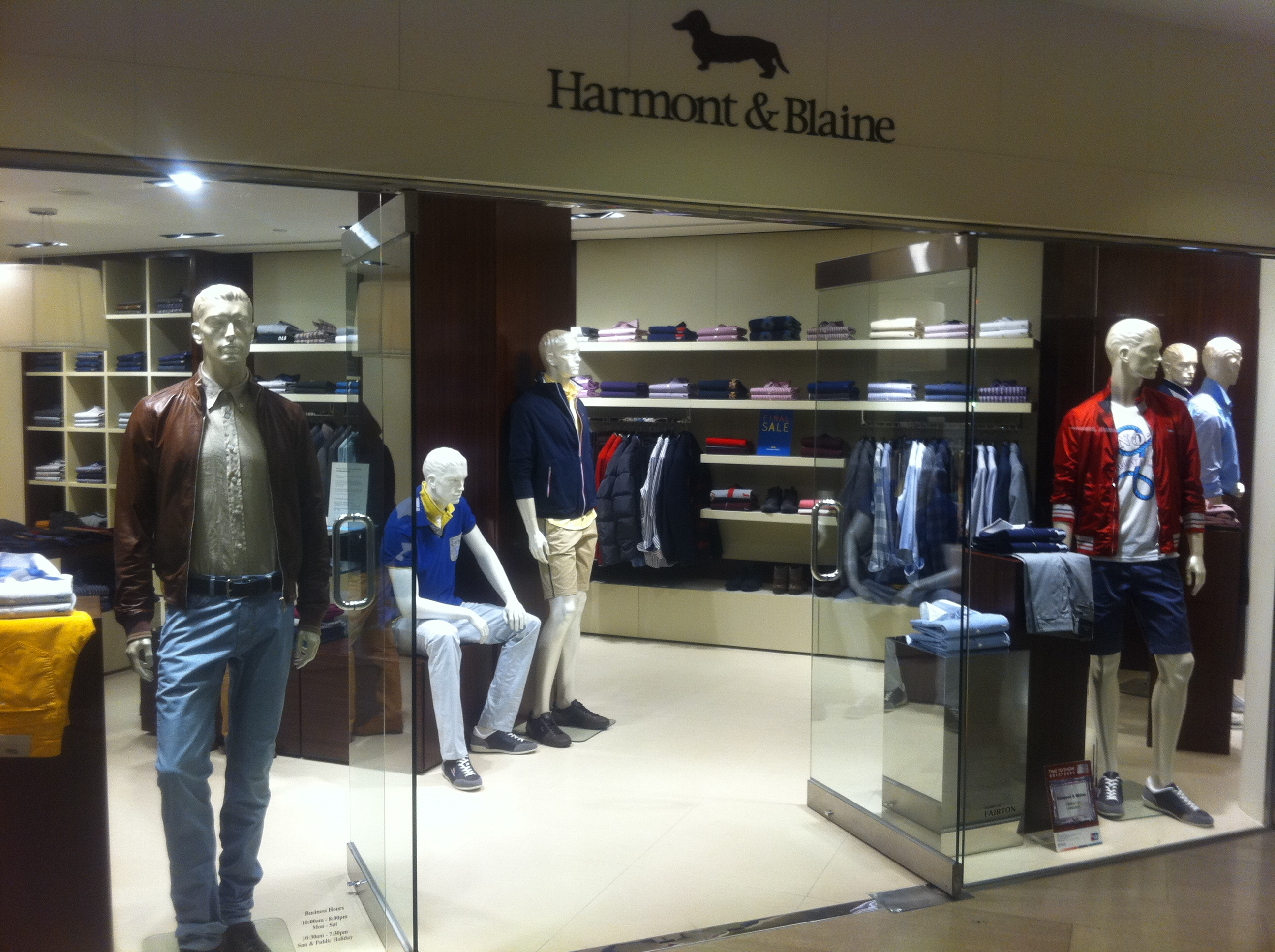
An Harmont & Blaine store

In 1986, Domenico Menniti founded a firm named PDM, along with his brothers and his business partners Enzo Menniti, and Paolo and Massimo Montefusco. The firm focused primarily on leather gloves, but in 1993 it expanded with its first collection of swimming trunks. Then, in 1995, the collection grew with the addition of shirts, trousers and sweaters.

Their first boutique opened in 2000 in Frattamaggiore, Naples. Shortly afterwards, a new boutique was opened in Capri and another one in Miami, Florida.

The product line Harmont & Blaine Junior was launched in 2005 by AGB Company, which owned the licence. In 2006, PDM was renamed to Harmont & Blaine. Many months after, a special meeting approved an assets increase on 1 October 2007.

In 2008, the firm Giano signed a business deal for the production and distribution of a new product line of Harmont & Blaine, named Harmont & Blaine Shoes.

The firm presented the Woman Collection in June 2010. During the same year, a co-branding operation with Honda resulted in the creation of a new car, the Honda CR-V Harmont & Blaine.

Since 2012–2013, the design, production and distribution of new lines has moved to the direct management of the company. In June 2013, the Man Collection was announced to the press during Milan Fashion Week. After that, another flagship store was inaugurated in Prague in October.

After many store openings all around the world, on 30 October 2014, Clessidra acquired 35% of Harmont & Blaine's stock, in order to support the plan of international growth of the firm. Harmont & Blaine expanded to other locations such as Prague, and Qatar through Abuissa Holding.

According to its international development plan inside the French market, the firm established the subsidiary company Harmont & Blaine France and inaugurated its first boutique on 35 Boulevard des Capucines, Paris, in October 2015. Harmont & Blaine continued its plan of expansion abroad, especially in France, where another boutique was opened in Cannes, housing collections for men, women and children during the following year.

In September 2020, the management of the company that has 140 points of sale changed: Paolo Montefusco president, Marco Pirone CEO.

In 2020, Harmont & Blaine became official style partner of AC Milan. In 2021, the brand released a special AC Milan capsule collection as part of the collaboration.

== Finances ==
The company shows a positive increase of 5.7% at the end of the 2014 financial year with a turnover of 75 million EUR, confirming the stable trend of growth of the last ten years.

The first reference market is Italy, which represents (in 2014) 81% of the firm's revenues, equal to 59.3 million EUR with a growth of 3.7% compared to 57.1 million EUR in 2013. Extra UE sales produced a growth of 22.5% compared to the results of 2013 in the face of a stable market in Europe (especially in Italy). In 2014, the revenue associated with the royalties were around 1.36 million EUR, which testified that the two product lines Junior and Shoes were proceeding with a positive trend of growth.

The margin income of the company in 2014:

- Ebitda is 7.4 million EUR with 10% turnover.
- Ebit is 4.5 million EUR with 6% turnover.

== See also ==
- Italian fashion
