= Sirens F.C. =

Association football club in Malta

- Full name: Sirens Football Club
- Nicknames: Whites/Blues; Is-Sireni
- Founded: 1968; 58 years ago
- Ground: Sirens Stadium
- Capacity: 600
- Chairman: David Muscat
- Manager: Stephen Damato
- League: Maltese Challenge League
- 2023–24: Maltese Premier League, 13th (relegated)
Home colours	Away colours

Active departments of Sirens
- Football (Men's): Waterpolo

Sirens Football Club is a professional football club from the north-western seaside village of San Pawl il-Baħar, in Malta. Founded in 1968, they currently compete in the Maltese Challenge League.

== Club history ==
Sirens FC was first known as "St. Paul's Bay Football Team" for the seasons 1968–69 and participated in the Amateur Soccer Cup Competition (ASCC). In their debut season, the St Paul's Bay team ended runners up that year. After obtaining such a good placing, the committee applied for affiliation in the Third Division of the Malta Football Association. A delegation from the MFA visited the club, which at that time was on the same premises as the Sirens Aquatic Sports Club. At this point one has to mention Joe Muscat, known as id-Debu, who is the founder of Sirens FC.

Up to 1972 the club was known as Sirens Football Team because as mentioned before, they had no premises until a house was obtained at 61, St Paul's Street, St. Paul's Bay. The new premise was officially opened by the Hon. Minister of Culture and Education, Miss Agatha Barbara on 29 January 1972.

Season 2013–14 The blues left the league with an unbeaten record in the 2013-14 Maltese Third Division that made a big honour to them, Giovanni Galea made his all time goal scoring goals by scoring 44 goals in a single season, making him the record goalscorer in a single season in Maltese football (any level), breaking the record of Danilo Doncic.

On 3 April 2019 Sirens FC secured a historic promotion to the Maltese Premier League as they celebrate the club's fiftieth anniversary after defeating Mqabba 4–0 at the Victor Tedesco Stadium. 17 days after Sirens FC secured a promotion to the Maltese Premier League Sirens FC played against Vittoriosa Stars the game ended a draw no goals, Sirens FC finish as 2018–19 Maltese First Division Champions with 25 games played.

After the first historic promotion, the team achieved another goal securing a place in a European competition for the first time, after reaching the fourth place in the season 2019-20 (terminated on 18 May 2020 due to the effects of the COVID-19 pandemic in the island). In its first ever European match, the team lost against Bulgarian side CSKA Sofia for 2–1, being eliminated in the first qualifying round of the UEFA Europa League.

== Sirens Supporters ==
Sirens Supporters Club (SS.13) is the latest registered supporting club in Malta. The club was founded in 2013 as in that year in 2013-14 Maltese Third Division Sirens FC were in their glory as they won the league title unbeaten and ending the season with a dramatic draw against Swieqi United. Sirens supporters are also called Sirens Ultras 13.

In season 2013–2014 Sirens FC held the record for most supporters in the Malta Third Division, which record was previously held by Attard F.C. and Swieqi United F.C. The support for the club is constantly growing as presently the club plays in the Maltese Premier League for the first time ever.

Last game and derby of the 2015-16 Maltese Second Division against Mgarr United, Sirens supporters for the first time in the history organized a choreography to celebrate promotion to the Malta First Division. Unfortunately the boys in blue lost the derby and the chance to win the title, but the supporters never stopped chanting for their team that climbed in a higher league.

Sirens rivals are Mgarr United and Mellieha S.C. games between these clubs are usually referred to as The Derby of the North. Matches between Sirens and Mellieha are also called The Blue Derby, as both teams has the same color.

== Sirens Stadium ==
In 2011, they have a newly built training ground and pitch named Sirens Stadium with official Fifa-rated artificial surface. Most of the team's home games will be played at this venue. Before the stadium was built in the 1970s the St. Paul's Bay Football Club, as they were referred to before, or the man in blue played at the MFA stadiums in Ta' Qali till the 2010. The new stadium is built just between Bugibba and St. Paul's Bay as it is situated between the Coast Road highway and high-rise buildings of Bugibba. FIFA officially confirmed that the new Sirens Stadium can host competitive games from two local leagues, Maltese Third Division and the Maltese Second Division. The stadium can hold over 1000 supporters in 3 stands, the left support stand, the VIP area and the right support stand. Usually whenever Sirens play in the stadium supporters use the left side also called the home end.

== Presidential history ==
Year	President
1968–1970	Francis X Attard
1970–1998	Lawrence Gatt
1998–2014	Ċensu Galea
2014–2015	Robert Piscopo
2015–2017	Joe Aguis
2017–2025	Mark Borg Hedley
2025–2026	John Sant
2026–	David Muscat

=== Kit evolution ===
First

1968–1970	1970–1990	1990–2005	2005–2010	2010–2016

== European record ==
As of 27 August 2020

Season	Competition	Round	Club	Home	Away	Agg.
2020–21	UEFA Europa League	1QR	(Bulgaria) CSKA Sofia	—N/a	1−2	—N/a

Notes

- QR: Qualifying round

== Current squad ==
As of 2 November 2024. Note: Flags indicate national team as defined under FIFA eligibility rules; some limited exceptions apply. Players may hold more than one non-FIFA nationality.

No.	Pos.	Nation	Player
1	GK	MLT	Ryan Vella
3	DF	MLT	Kane Paul Farrugia
4	DF	MLT	Ryan Mercieca
5	DF	BRA	Carlos Chabá
6	DF	MLT	Kyle Muscat
7	FW	MLT	Trezeguet Zammit
8	MF	ITA	Leonardo De Bortoli
10	FW	BRA	Thiago Nonato
11	MF	MLT	Alan Wismayer
12	GK	MLT	Ryan Caruana
13	GK	MLT	Matthew Grima

No.	Pos.	Nation	Player
14	MF	MLT	Mason Agius
16	FW	MLT	Joel Ellul
18	MF	GHA	Mohammed Akadom
19	FW	MLT	Isaac Schembri
20	DF	MLT	Kevin Muscat
22	DF	MLT	Gary Camilleri
23	FW	GHA	Joshua Agyemang
25	FW	USA	Joel Quist
26	DF	MLT	Sacha Borg
77	MF	MLT	Jean Borg

== Achievements ==
Convenience Challenge Cup Champions:
2016–17

Mellieha Challenge Cup Champions:
2015–16

Maltese First Division Champions:
2018–19

Maltese Second Division Runners-up:
2015–16

Maltese Third Division Champions:
1972–73, 1979–80, 1982–83, 1988–89, 2013–14

Maltese Fourth Division Champions :
1976–77

Maltese Third Division Runners-up:
2006–07

Division Knock Out Champions :
1973–74

Division Knock Out Runners-up:
1992–93, 2002–03

Sons of Malta Cup Champions :
1974–75
