= Capelli Sport =

American sportswear company

- Type: Subsidiary
- Industry: Textile, footwear
- Founded: 2011; 15 years ago
- Founder: George Altirs
- Headquarters: New York, United States
- Area served: Americas, Europe, Middle East, Africa
- Key people: George Altirs (CEO)
- Products: Apparel, footwear, sportswear, sports equipment
- Parent: GMA Accessories Inc.
- Subsidiaries: Capelli New York (USA); GMA Shanghai (China); GMA Dhaka (Bangladesh); Capelli Europe (Europe)
- Website: capellisport.com

Capelli Sport is an American sportswear and footwear company based in New York, United States, subsidiary of the GMA Accessories Inc. Founded in 2011 by Lebanon-born and New York–based entrepreneur George Altirs, Capelli Sport also has locations in Europe, the Middle East, and Africa under Capelli Europe GmbH, and in China under GMA Shanghai.

Capelli Sport has focused on the soccer market, producing kits, goalkeeper gloves, and balls, as well as casual wear – such as t-shirts, hoodies, jackets and leggings – and accessories, such as bags and hats. Capelli's footwear products include sneakers and football boots.

== History ==
On January 24, 2017, Capelli Sport signed a corporate partnership with the Rochester Rhinos, a United Soccer League team, and their stadium was renamed Capelli Sport Stadium. Since January 20, 2021, Capelli Sport has held 40.1% of the shares of German soccer club MSV Duisburg. In June, Capelli Sport became the official uniform and equipment provider of Heartland Soccer Association, starting in the Fall.

Capelli Sport has equipped various soccer teams, most notably AEK Athens, MSV Duisburg, SV Austria Salzburg and the Lebanon national team.

On March 15, 2023, Capelli partnered with US-based Legends FC for their 2023 season. Capelli Sport will be in charge of the uniform, apparel, and the equipment. Players will also have access to Capelli Sport's European clubs, events, coaching, education, and a players pathways club.
