= 2016–17 Maltese Premier League =

Maltese Premier League
- Season: 2016–17
- Dates: 19 August 2016 – 6 May 2017
- Champions: Hibernians (12th title)
- Relegated: Pembroke Athleta
- Champions League: Hibernians
- Europa League: Balzan; Valletta; Floriana
- Matches: 198
- Goals: 570 (2.88 per match)
- Top goalscorer: Bojan Kaljević (23 goals)
- Biggest home win: Tarxien Rainbows 7–1 Pembroke Athleta (22 January 2017); Balzan 7–1 Mosta (24 February 2017); St. Andrews 6–0 Pembroke Athleta (9 April 2017)
- Biggest away win: Gżira United 1–7 Birkirkara (22 October 2016)
- Highest scoring: Gżira United 1–7 Birkirkara (22 October 2016); Tarxien Rainbows 7–1 Pembroke Athleta (22 January 2017); Balzan 7–1 Mosta (24 February 2017)

The 2016–17 Maltese Premier League was the 102nd season of the Maltese Premier League. The season began on 19 August 2016 and concluded on 6 May 2017; the relegation play-off took place on 12 May 2017. Valletta were the defending champions, having won their 23rd title the previous season.

On 30 April 2017, Hibernians defeated St. Andrews 3–1 to clinch their 12th Maltese league title.

== Format ==
For this season, in a change from recent previous seasons, points earned in the first 22 matches were no longer halved. Each team therefore played 33 matches, home-and-away against each other team (22 matches), and then one more match (either home or away) against each other team.

== Venues ==
2016–17 Maltese Premier League is located in Malta	Ta' Qali	Ta' Qali	Paola	Hamrun
2016–17 Maltese Premier League is located in Malta	Ta' Qali National Stadium	Centenary Stadium	Tony Bezzina Stadium	Victor Tedesco Stadium
2016–17 Maltese Premier League is located in Malta	Capacity: 16,997	Capacity: 3,000	Capacity: 2,968	Capacity: 1,962

== Teams and stadiums ==
Locations of the 2016–17 Maltese Premier League teams

Naxxar Lions and Qormi were relegated to the 2016–17 Maltese First Division after they finished eleventh and twelfth, respectively, the previous season. They were replaced by Gżira United and Ħamrun Spartans, champions and runners-up respectively of the 2015–16 Maltese First Division.

Team	City	Stadium	Capacity
Balzan	Balzan	Victor Tedesco Stadium	6,000
Birkirkara	Birkirkara	Ta' Qali National Stadium	17,797
Floriana	Floriana	Independence Arena	3,000
Gżira United	Gżira	Ta' Qali National Stadium	17,797
Ħamrun Spartans	Ħamrun	Victor Tedesco Stadium	6,000
Hibernians	Paola	Hibernians Ground	2,968
Mosta	Mosta	Charles Abela Memorial Stadium	600
Pembroke Athleta	Pembroke	Sirens Stadium	1,500
Sliema Wanderers	Sliema	Tigne Sports Complex	1,000
St. Andrews	St. Andrew's	Luxol Sports Ground	800
Tarxien Rainbows	Tarxien	Tony Cassar Sports Ground	1,000
Valletta	Valletta	Centenary Stadium	2,000

Source: Scoresway

== League table ==
Pos	Team	Pld	W	D	L	GF	GA	GD	Pts	Qualification or relegation
1	Hibernians (C)	33	22	5	6	64	31	+33	71	Qualification for the 2017–18 UEFA Champions League
2	Balzan	33	19	7	7	66	40	+26	64	Qualification for the 2017–18 UEFA Europa League
3	Birkirkara (Note: Birkirkara would have qualified for the Europa League first qualifying round, but failed to obtain a UEFA licence.)	33	18	8	7	64	30	+34	62	
4	Valletta	33	16	11	6	51	29	+22	59	Qualification for the 2017–18 UEFA Europa League
5	Floriana (Note: Floriana qualified for the 2017–18 UEFA Europa League by winning the 2016–17 Maltese FA Trophy.)	33	15	9	9	51	37	+14	54	Qualification for the 2017–18 UEFA Europa League
6	Sliema Wanderers	33	15	7	11	47	37	+10	52	
7	Gżira United	33	10	7	16	43	51	−8	37	
8	St. Andrews	33	9	10	14	45	51	−6	37	
9	Tarxien Rainbows	33	8	11	14	38	48	−10	35	
10	Hamrun Spartans	33	9	6	18	44	61	−17	33	
11	Mosta (Note: Mosta were deducted five points for making illegal payments to a player registered as an amateur.) (O)	33	7	5	21	29	71	−42	21	Qualification for the Relegation Play-Offs
12	Pembroke Athleta (R)	33	4	6	23	28	84	−56	18	Relegation to the 2017–18 Maltese First Division

Source: Malta Football Association, Soccerway
Rules for classification: 1) Points; 2) Play-offs (only if needed to decide champions, teams for relegation or teams for UEFA competitions).
(C) Champions; (O) Play-off winners; (R) Relegated

== Results ==
=== Matches 1–22 ===
Home \ Away	BAL	BIR	FLO	GŻI	ĦAM	HIB	MOS	PEM	SLI	STA	TAR	VAL
Balzan	—	1–1	1–3	3–1	3–1	2–1	3–2	4–0	1–2	3–0	2–2	2–2
Birkirkara	3–0	—	1–2	2–1	2–1	0–1	2–0	2–0	1–2	4–0	3–1	0–1
Floriana	0–1	1–1	—	1–0	5–1	0–0	4–0	2–1	1–3	4–1	1–1	2–0
Gżira United	1–2	1–7	4–3	—	0–2	0–3	3–0	3–0	1–0	3–2	1–1	1–3
Ħamrun Spartans	0–1	2–0	1–1	1–1	—	1–4	3–0	2–1	0–3	3–1	2–3	0–3
Hibernians	0–2	1–2	2–2	1–1	1–3	—	3–1	1–1	3–1	1–0	1–0	1–0
Mosta	0–1	0–2	0–1	2–1	2–5	0–2	—	0–3	2–1	1–0	0–2	0–1
Pembroke Athleta	1–2	2–1	1–2	0–0	1–0	1–2	0–3 (Note: Match awarded 3–0 to Mosta after a successful protest; original result was Pembroke Athleta 5–0 Mosta.)	—	0–1	2–2	2–2	0–3
Sliema Wanderers	1–1	2–1	3–1	1–0	1–2	0–1	1–1	1–1	—	1–1	2–1	1–2
St. Andrews	0–1	1–1	1–3	1–0	3–1	1–2	1–1	4–1	3–0	—	1–0	0–0
Tarxien Rainbows	2–2	0–4	1–0	1–0	2–1	1–2	1–1	7–1	1–0	1–1	—	1–1
Valletta	2–2	1–1	0–0	1–0	2–0	0–2	0–0	5–1	2–1	1–1	1–0	—

Source: Malta Football Association
Legend: Blue = home team win; Yellow = draw; Red = away team win.

=== Matches 23–33 ===
Home \ Away	BAL	BIR	FLO	GŻI	ĦAM	HIB	MOS	PEM	SLI	STA	TAR	VAL
Balzan	—	—	—	3–1	1–1	—	7–1	—	—	2–1	—	0–1
Birkirkara	3–1	—	—	—	3–0	2–0	3–0	—	—	2–2	—	—
Floriana	0–2	1–2	—	1–1	—	2–3	—	2–0	—	—	—	1–1
Gżira United	—	1–1	—	—	—	—	—	5–1	0–1	—	1–0	1–1
Ħamrun Spartans	—	—	1–2	1–3	—	—	—	1–2	0–2	1–1	—	2–1
Hibernians	3–1	—	—	2–0	3–3	—	4–0	—	—	3–1	—	—
Mosta	—	—	0–2	1–4	2–1	—	—	4–2	—	1–2	—	0–4
Pembroke Athleta	2–5	0–2	—	—	—	0–3	—	—	0–2	—	1–1	—
Sliema Wanderers	2–1	1–1	3–0	—	—	1–2	1–1	—	—	—	1–1	—
St. Andrews	—	—	0–0	2–3	—	—	—	6–0	1–4	—	1–0	3–1
Tarxien Rainbows	0–3	0–1	0–1	—	1–1	1–6	1–3	—	—	—	—	—
Valletta	—	3–3	—	—	—	1–0	—	4–0	3–1	—	0–2	—

Source: Malta Football Association
Legend: Blue = home team win; Yellow = draw; Red = away team win.

== Relegation play-offs ==
A play-off match took place between the eleventh-placed team from the Premier League, Mosta, and the fourth-placed team from the First Division, Qormi, for a place in the 2017–18 Maltese Premier League. Mosta retained their spot in the Maltese Premier League, while Qormi remained in the Maltese First Division.

12 May 2017
19:30 CEST

Mosta	3–1	Qormi
Triganza 56'; Pedrinho 58'; Priso 82'	Report	Medic 6'

National Stadium, Ta' Qali
Referee: Alan Mario Sant

== Top scorers ==
As of matches played on 5 May 2017

Rank	Player	Club	Goals
1	(Montenegro) Bojan Kaljević	Balzan	23
2	(Malta) Jurgen Degabriele	Hibernians	16
3	(Italy) Mario Fontanella	Floriana	14
4	(Slovenia) Vito Plut	Birkirkara	13
5	(Malta) Jake Grech	Ħamrun Spartans	12
6	(Serbia) Srđan Dimitrov	Ħamrun Spartans	11
6	(Sweden) Alexander Nilsson	Tarxien Rainbows	11
6	(Malta) Jean Paul Farrugia	Sliema Wanderers	11
9	(Brazil) Jorginho	Hibernians	10
