= 1944–45 Maltese Premier League =

Maltese First Division
- Season: 1944–45
- Champions: Valletta F.C. (3rd title)
- Matches played: 6
- Goals scored: 24 (4 per match)

The 1944–45 Maltese First Division was the 30th season of top-tier football in Malta. It was contested by 4 teams, and Valletta F.C. won the championship.

== Teams ==
Locations of the 1944–45 Maltese First Division teams

== League standings ==
Pos	Team	Pld	W	D	L	GF	GA	GD	Pts
1	Valletta F.C. (C)	3	2	0	1	7	3	+4	4
2	Sliema Athletics	3	1	1	1	10	5	+5	3
3	Floriana F.C.	3	1	1	1	3	5	−2	3
4	Melita F.C.	3	1	0	2	4	11	−7	2

Source: rsssf.com
(C) Champions

== Results ==
Home \ Away	VLT	SLM	FRN	MLT
Valletta	—	3–1	3–0	1–2
Sliema Athletics		—	1–1	8–1
Floriana			—	2–1
Melita				—
