= 1986–87 Maltese Premier League =

Maltese Premier League
- Season: 1986–87
- Champions: Hamrun Spartans F.C. (5th title)
- Relegated: Rabat Ajax F.C. Tarxien Rainbows F.C.
- European Cup: Hamrun Spartans F.C.
- European Cup Winners' Cup: Sliema Wanderers F.C.
- UEFA Cup: Valletta F.C.
- Matches played: 57
- Goals scored: 131 (2.3 per match)

The 1986–87 Maltese Premier League was the 7th season of the Maltese Premier League, and the 72nd season of top-tier football in Malta. It was contested by 8 teams, and Hamrun Spartans F.C. won the championship.

== Teams ==
Locations of the 1986–87 Maltese Premier League teams

== League standings ==
Pos	Team	Pld	W	D	L	GF	GA	GD	Pts	Qualification
1	Ħamrun Spartans F.C. (C)	14	11	3	0	25	6	+19	25	Qualification for the European Cup
2	Valletta F.C.	14	4	8	2	17	12	+5	16	Qualification for the UEFA Cup
3	Żurrieq F.C.	14	7	2	5	24	11	+13	16	
4	Sliema Wanderers F.C.	14	5	4	5	12	16	−4	14	Qualification for the European Cup Winners' Cup (Note: Sliema Wanderers qualified for the Cup Winners' Cup as Maltese FA Trophy Runners-up, as winners Hamrun Spartans already qualified for the European Cup.)
5	Floriana F.C.	14	4	5	5	11	12	−1	13	
6	Hibernians F.C.	14	5	3	6	12	17	−5	13	
7	Rabat Ajax F.C. (R)	14	4	4	6	21	13	+8	12	Relegation
8	Tarxien Rainbows F.C. (R)	14	1	1	12	6	41	−35	3	Relegation

Source: rsssf.com
(C) Champions; (R) Relegated

== Second Place tie-breaker ==
With both Valletta and Zurrieq level on 16 points, a play-off match was conducted to qualification for the UEFA Cup

Valletta F.C.	2–1	Żurrieq F.C.

== Results ==
Home \ Away	FRN	HIB	ĦMR	RBT	SLM	TRX	VLT	ŻRQ
Floriana	—	1–0	0–0	3–2	1–1	1–1	0–0	0–2
Hibernians	1–0	—	0–1	0–4	2–0	1–0	1–1	2–1
Ħamrun Spartans	3–1	4–1	—	2–1	2–0	5–1	1–1	1–0
Rabat Ajax	1–0	0–0	0–1	—	0–0	7–0	1–1	0–2
Sliema Wanderers	0–1	1–0	0–2	1–0	—	2–1	2–2	1–0
Tarxien Rainbows	0–3	1–0	1–2	0–3	0–3	—	1–3	0–6
Valletta	1–0	1–1	0–0	1–0	1–1	4–0	—	0–2
Żurrieq	0–0	2–3	0–1	2–2	4–0	1–0	2–1	—

Legend: Blue = home team win; Yellow = draw; Red = away team win.
