= 1990–91 Maltese Premier League =

Maltese Premier League
- Season: 1990–91
- Champions: Ħamrun Spartans (7th title)
- Relegated: Naxxar Lions
- European Cup: Ħamrun Spartans
- European Cup Winners' Cup: Valletta
- UEFA Cup: Floriana
- Matches played: 72
- Goals scored: 170 (2.36 per match)
- Top goalscorer: Joe Zarb (12)

The 1990–91 Maltese Premier League was the 11th season of the Maltese Premier League, and the 76th season of top-tier football in Malta. It was contested by 9 teams, and Hamrun Spartans F.C. won the championship.

== Teams ==
Locations of the 1990–91 Maltese Premier League teams

== League standings ==
Pos	Team	Pld	W	D	L	GF	GA	GD	Pts	
1	Ħamrun Spartans F.C. (C)	16	10	4	2	31	18	+13	24	Qualification for the European Cup
2	Valletta F.C.	16	8	3	5	28	17	+11	19	Qualification for the European Cup Winners' Cup (Note: Valletta qualified for the Cup Winners' Cup as Maltese FA Trophy Winners)
3	Floriana F.C.	16	6	6	4	15	11	+4	18	Qualification for the UEFA Cup
4	Hibernians F.C.	16	5	7	4	18	15	+3	17	
5	Sliema Wanderers F.C.	16	4	7	5	24	20	+4	15	
6	Rabat Ajax F.C.	16	4	6	6	18	19	−1	14	
7	Żurrieq F.C.	16	4	6	6	12	19	−7	14	
8	Birkirkara F.C.	16	3	7	6	13	22	−9	13	
9	Naxxar Lions (R)	16	3	4	9	11	29	−18	10	Relegation

Source: rsssf.com
(C) Champions; (R) Relegated

== Results ==
Home \ Away	BKR	FRN	HIB	ĦMR	NXR	RBT	SLM	VLT	ŻRQ
Birkirkara	—	1–2	0–0	1–3	0–0	1–1	1–1	1–3	0–0
Floriana	0–0	—	1–2	1–3	0–0	1–1	1–0	1–0	0–1
Hibernians	3–0	1–1	—	1–3	1–0	2–0	1–1	1–2	0–0
Ħamrun Spartans	1–2	0–1	2–1	—	3–1	1–0	4–3	0–0	3–2
Naxxar Lions	3–1	0–4	1–1	0–2	—	0–0	2–0	0–6	2–0
Rabat Ajax	0–0	2–1	0–1	2–3	5–2	—	0–0	0–1	2–2
Sliema Wanderers	1–2	0–0	2–2	2–2	1–0	0–2	—	3–2	1–1
Valletta	3–1	0–1	1–1	1–1	3–0	4–2	0–3	—	0–2
Żurrieq	1–2	0–0	1–0	0–0	2–0	0–1	0–6	0–2	—

Legend: Blue = home team win; Yellow = draw; Red = away team win.

== Top goalscorers ==
Rank	Player	Club	Goals
1	(Malta) Joe Zarb	Valletta	12
2	(Malta) Jesmond Zerafa	Valletta	7
2	(Malta) Steve Scott	Hibernians	7
4	(Malta) Emanuel Brincat	Ħamrun Spartans	6
4	(Malta) Martin Gregory	Sliema Wanderers	6
4	(Malta) Hubert Suda	Sliema Wanderers	6
