= Paul Zammit (footballer) =

Maltese footballer and manager

Personal information
- Full name: Paul Zammit
- Date of birth: 21 September 1969 (age 57)
- Place of birth: Malta
- Height: 1.80 m (5 ft 11 in)
- Position: Forward

Team information
- Current team: Birkirkara F.C. (manager)

Senior career*
Years	Team	Apps	(Gls)
1990–1996	Rabat Ajax	69	(26)
1996–1998	Hibernians	16	(33)
1997–2002	Ħamrun Spartans	62	(24)
2002–2003	Mosta	18	(27)
Total		165	(110)

International career
	Malta U21		(3)

Managerial career
- 2003–2005: Mosta
- 2005–2009: Valletta
- 2009–2011: Birkirkara
- 2011–2015: Birkirkara
- 2015–2017: Valletta
- 2017–2019: Birkirkara
- 2020: Gżira United
- 2021–2022: Balzan
- 2022–2026: Sliema Wanderers
- 2026-: Birkirkara F.C.
- * Club domestic league appearances and goals

Paul Zammit (born 21 September 1969) is a Maltese manager and a former footballer, current manager of Birkirkara F.C.. During his career he played as a forward.

== Playing career ==
He played from 1990 to 2003, for Rabat Ajax, Hibernians, Ħamrun Spartans and Mosta.

== Managerial career ==
At the end of 2003 he retired as a player and became coach of Mosta. In 2005, he moved to Valletta.

In 2008, he won the Maltese Coach of the Season award for coaching Valletta to victory in the Maltese Premier League. Valletta competed in the Champions League in July 2008 and were eliminated by Artmedia Petrzalka. Zammit's disciplined preparation for the two games meant the team were competitive.

In September 2008 he signed a two-year contract to continue coaching the club.

For the 2009–10 season Paul Zammit became the manager of Birkirkara. He managed to build up a squad with great teamwork and on 30 April 2010, his side beat Tarxien Rainbows and won the Maltese Premier League title with a game to play. At the end of the 2010–11 season, he was not offered a new contract by the Birkirkara committee. On 2 October 2011, Zammit was re-appointed as the club's head coach for the next two seasons.

On 23 January 2020 he was named head coach of Gżira United. After just a few months, he agreed with the club to leave the position on 29 May.

On 23 October 2021 Zammit has been confirmed as the new coach of Balzan F.C., signing a two-years contract. He parted ways with the club on 25 April 2022 by mutual agreement, after a poor run of form. On 9 June 2022, Zammit was appointed manager of Sliema Wanderers. After getting promoted from Challenge League in 2023 and winning the 2023–24 Maltese FA Trophy, Zammit resigned as Sliema coach in January 2026. Zammit was appointed Birkirkara coach on the 31st of January 2026.

== Honours ==
=== Valletta ===
Winner

- Premier League (2): 2007–08, 2015–16
- Super Cup (2): 2008, 2016

=== Birkirkara ===
Winner

- Premier League (2): 2009–10, 2012–13
- FA Trophy (1): 2014–15
- Super Cup (2): 2013, 2014

=== Sliema Wanderers ===
Winner

- FA Trophy (1): 2023–24
- Challenge League (1): 2022–23
