= 1945–46 Maltese Premier League =

Maltese First Division
- Season: 1945–46
- Champions: Valletta F.C. (4th title)
- Relegated: Msida Saint-Joseph F.C.
- Matches played: 42
- Goals scored: 181 (4.31 per match)

The 1945–46 Maltese First Division was the 31st season of top-tier football in Malta. The competition was contested by 7 teams, and Valletta F.C. won the championship.

There were changes from the Malta Football Association that every locality they have to represent one club. This season introduced the promotion and relegation.

== League standings ==
Pos	Team	Pld	W	D	L	GF	GA	GD	Pts	Qualification
1	Valletta F.C. (C)	12	8	3	1	32	13	+19	19	Champions
2	Sliema Wanderers F.C.	12	8	1	3	39	15	+24	17	
3	Floriana F.C.	12	6	4	2	31	9	+22	16	
4	Hibernians F.C.	12	6	1	5	25	17	+8	13	
5	Melita F.C.	12	3	2	7	20	25	−5	8	
6	St. George's F.C.	12	2	3	7	17	41	−24	7	
7	Msida Saint-Joseph F.C. (R)	12	1	2	9	17	61	−44	4	Relegation

Source: rsssf.com
(C) Champions; (R) Relegated

== Results ==
Home \ Away	FRN	HIB	MLT	MSD	SLM	STG	VLT
Floriana	—	2–1	4–0	6–1	2–0	6–1	0–0
Hibernians	0–0	—	0–1	8–1	3–2	0–2	1–2
Melita	2–1	2–3	—	1–1	3–6	1–1	1–2
Msida Saint-Joseph	0–7	0–2	0–7	—	0–7	4–4	2–6
Sliema Wanderers	1–0	0–2	4–1	6–1	—	4–1	1–1
St. George's	2–2	1–5	2–1	0–7	0–4	—	1–4
Valletta	1–1	4–0	1–0	7–0	1–4	3–2	—

Legend: Blue = home team win; Yellow = draw; Red = away team win.
