= Balzan F.C. =

Association football club

Balzan
- Full name: Balzan Football Club
- Founded: 1937; 89 years ago (as Balzan Youths)
- President: Anton Tagliaferro
- Head coach: Andrew Cohen
- League: Maltese Premier League
- 2025–26: Maltese Challenge League, 1st of 12 (promoted)
- Website: balzanfc1937.com
Home colours	Away colours

Balzan Football Club, most commonly referred to as Balzan, is a Maltese professional football club from the village of Balzan that competes in the Maltese Premier League, the top tier of Maltese football. The club was founded as Balzan Youths in 1937 and played in the top division between 2010 and 2025. They were renamed Balzan FC in June 2012.

Balzan has qualified for the UEFA Europa League for five consecutive seasons (2015–16 to 2019–20). The club finished as runners-up in the Maltese Premier League in the 2016–17 and 2017–18 seasons and were finalists of the 2015–16 Maltese FA Trophy, which they lost on penalties to Sliema Wanderers after a goalless draw in the regular time. In May 2019, the club finally won its first major honour, the 2018–19 Maltese FA Trophy, after defeating Valletta on penalties in the final.

== Players ==
=== First-team squad ===
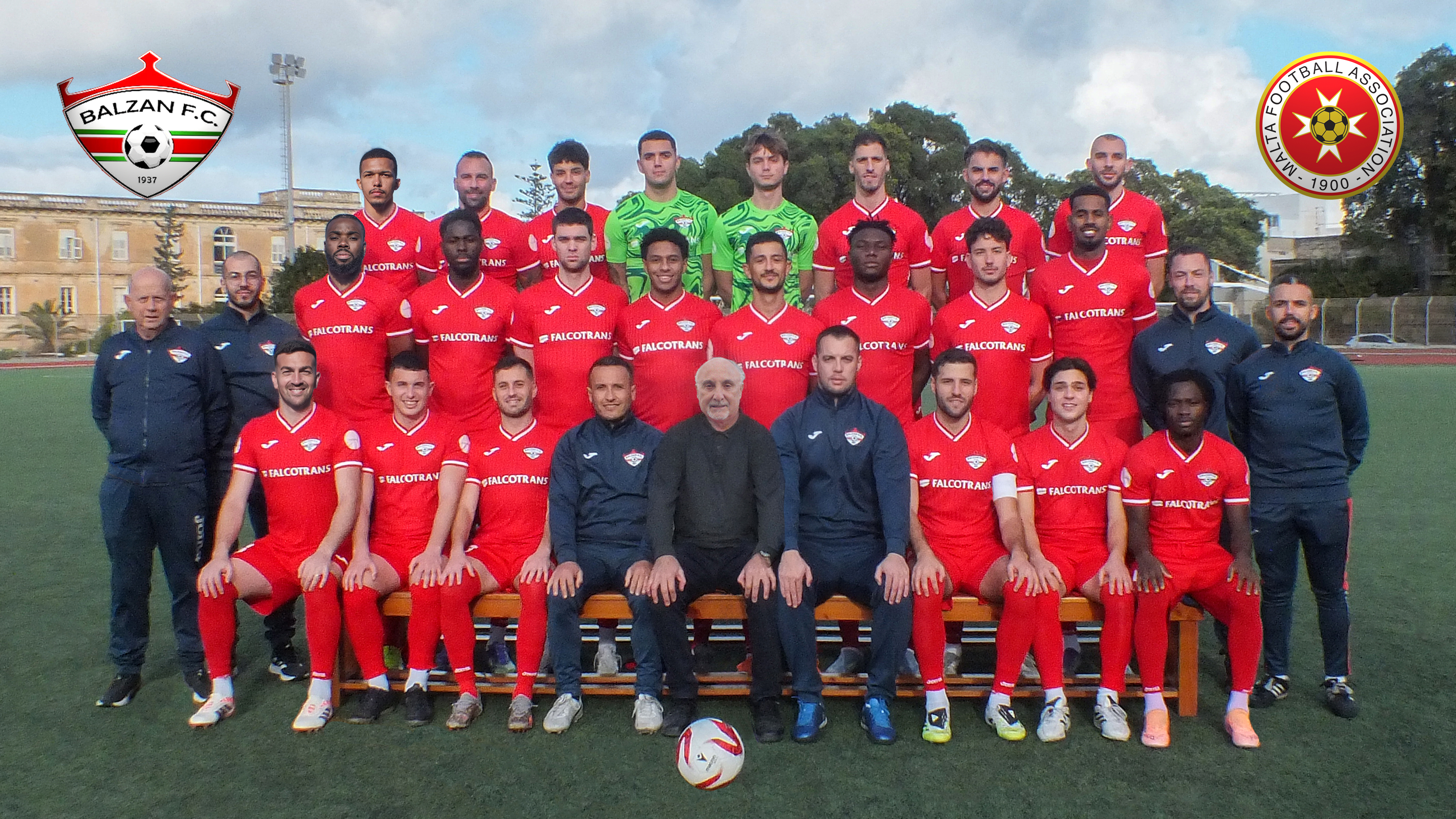
Balzan FC first team 2025/2026

As of 23 July 2026

Note: Flags indicate national team as defined under FIFA eligibility rules; some limited exceptions apply. Players may hold more than one non-FIFA nationality.

No.	Pos.	Nation	Player
1	GK	MLT	Dylan Ciappara
2	DF	SRB	Nikola Đorić
4	MF	MLT	Jake Portelli
5	DF	MLT	Samir Arab
6	MF	MLT	Jake Grech
7	MF	NGR	Emmanuel Mbong
8	DF	MLT	Nicholas Pulis
9	FW	NGR	Marzuq Yahaya
10	FW	MLT	James Scicluna
11	FW	BRA	Lucas Macula
14	FW	NGR	Oluwatobiloba Awosanya
17	MF	FRA	Sekala Guehi
18	MF	BRA	Eder

No.	Pos.	Nation	Player
19	FW	GHA	Emmanuel Asante
21	DF	BRA	Gabriel Santos
22	MF	AUS	Isaac Davey
23	MF	MLT	Sean Cipriott
24	MF	BRA	Rosiel
27	FW	MLT	Gianluca Cacciatore
42	DF	MLT	Zak Grech
44	DF	SRB	Nikola Ignjatovic
77	FW	SSD	Valentino Yuel
96	DF	BRA	Léo Fernandes
99	GK	GBS	Manuel Djalo

== Club facilities ==
The club's Administration Building, 'Solerville', is located at Main Street, Balzan. A bar and garden restaurant on the ground floor are open to the public. The club's training facilities, located at Robert Mifsud Bonnici Street, Lija, include a clubhouse and a full-size pitch with synthetic turf. The clubhouse includes a conference room, a bar and a gymnasium and was officially opened on 13 March 2011. From September 2015, Balzan teams also commenced training at St Aloysius' College ground, after the ground underwent a major upgrade.

In 2019, Balzan FC started the construction of an additional two-storey clubhouse at its Lija ground which features additional changing room facilities, as well as accommodation for visiting teams. The building was completed in late 2021.

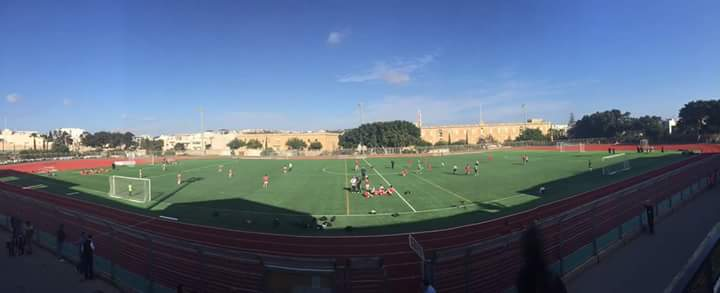
St Aloysius' College ground

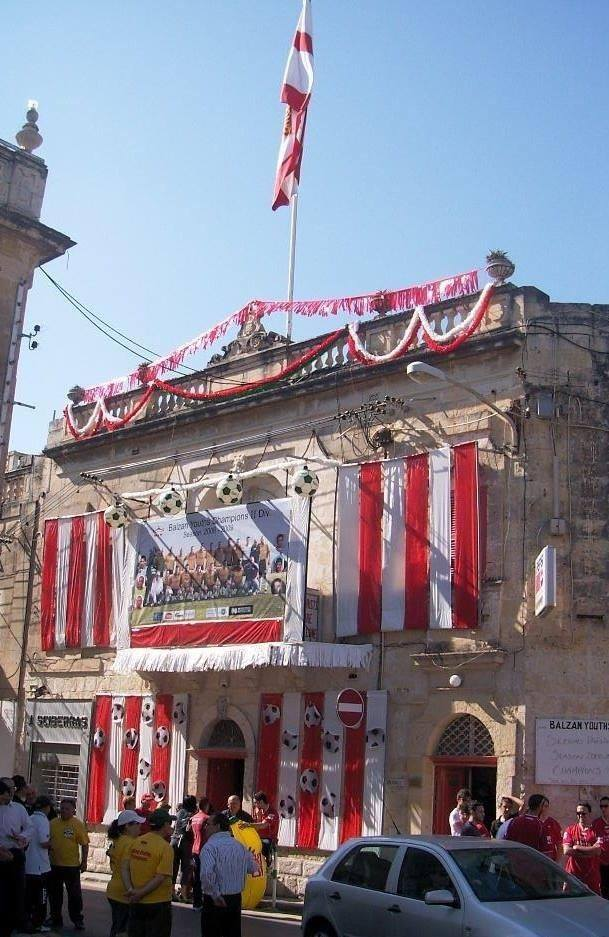
"Solerville"

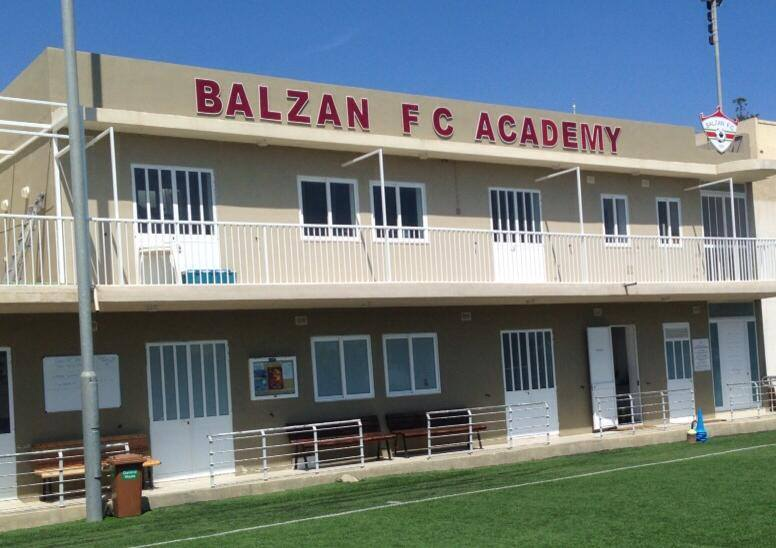
Training centre

== Honours ==
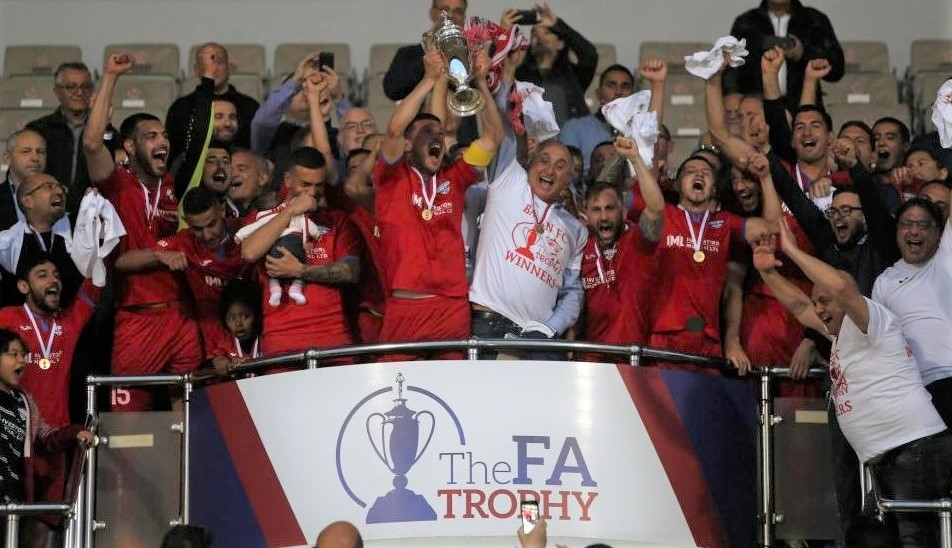
Balzan players celebrating the club's first major title in 2019, after defeating Valletta 5–4 on penalties in the Maltese FA Trophy final.

- Maltese Premier League
  - Runners-Up (2): 2016–17, 2017–18
- Maltese FA Trophy
  - Winners (1): 2018–19
  - Runners-Up (1): 2015–16
- Maltese Challenge League / Maltese First Division
  - Winners (2): 2010–11, 2025–26
  - Runners-Up (1): 2002–03
- Maltese Second Division
  - Winners (1): 2008–09
- Maltese Third Division
  - Winners (1): 1999-00

== European record ==
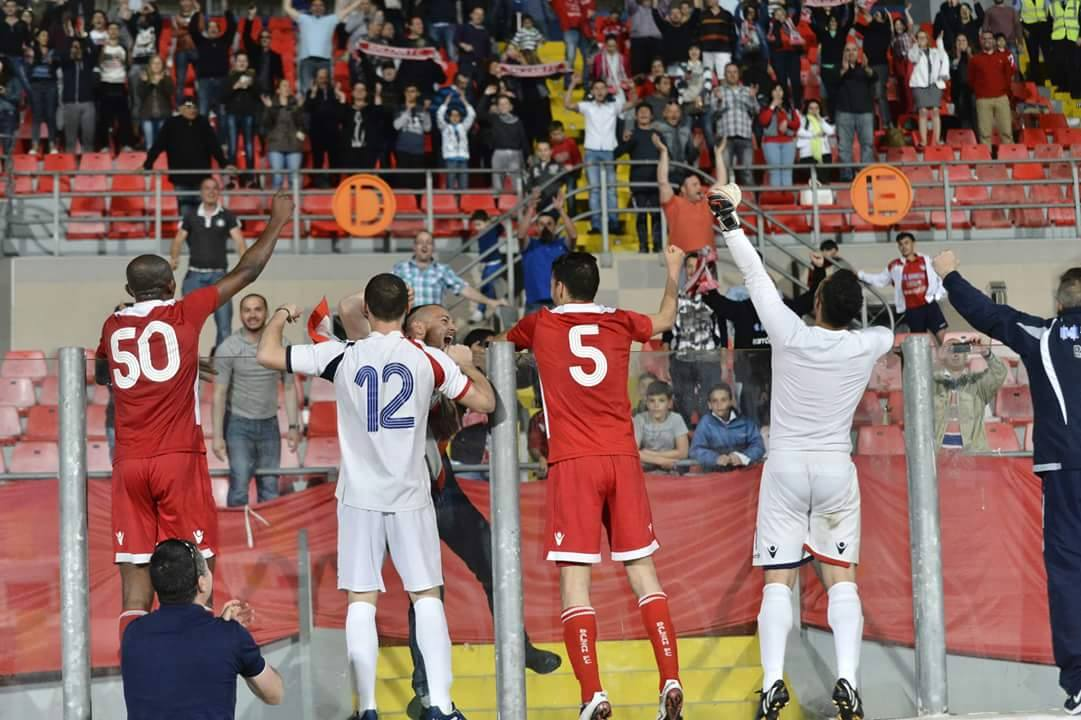
Balzan players and supporters celebrate the club's historic qualification to European competitions following a victory over Hibernians in April 2015.

All results (home and away) list Balzan's goal tally first.

Season	Competition	Round	Club	Home	Away	Aggregate
2015–16	UEFA Europa League	1Q	(Bosnia and Herzegovina) Željezničar	0–2	0–1	0–3
2016–17	UEFA Europa League	1Q	(Azerbaijan) Neftçi	0–2	2–1	2–3
2017–18	UEFA Europa League	1Q	(Hungary) Videoton	3−3	0−2	3−5
2018–19	UEFA Europa League	1Q	(Azerbaijan) Keşla	4−1	1−2	5−3
2018–19	UEFA Europa League	2Q	(Slovakia) Slovan Bratislava	2–1	1−3	3−4
2019–20	UEFA Europa League	1Q	(Slovenia) Domžale	3–4	0–1	3–5
2023–24	UEFA Europa Conference League	1Q	(Slovenia) Domžale	1–3 (a.e.t.)	4–1	5–4
2023–24	UEFA Europa Conference League	2Q	(Belarus) Neman Grodno	0−0	0–2	0–2

Notes

- 1Q: First qualifying round
- 2Q: Second qualifying round

== Historical list of coaches ==
- (Malta) Alfred Cardona (1983–84)
- (Malta) Paul Barbara (1989–90)
- (Malta) Jimmy Briffa (1990–93)
- (Malta) Alberto Cristiano (1993–94)
- (Malta) Ronnie Cocks (1994–95)
- (Malta) France Scicluna (1995–97)
- (Malta) Joe Attard (1997–98)
- (Malta) Stephen Azzopardi (1998–02)
- (Albania) Fatos Daja (2002–03)
- (Malta) Jimmy Briffa (2003–05)
- (Malta) Mario Monreal (2005–06)
- (Malta) Charles Borg Sant (2006–07)
- (Malta) Alfred Attard (2007–08)
- (Malta) Ivan Zammit (2008–13)
- (Italy) Riccardo Tumiatti (2013)
- (Malta) Jesmond Zerafa (2013–14)
- (Malta) Oliver Spiteri (2014–17)
- (Serbia) Marko Mićović (2017–19)
- (Malta) Jacques Scerri (2019–20)
- (England) Mark Miller (2020–21)
- (Malta) Paul Zammit (2021–22)
- (Malta) Oliver Spiteri (2022–2024)
- (England) Dave Rogers (2024)
- (England) Daryl Willard (2025)
- (Malta) Andrew Cohen (2025–present)
