= 2025–26 Hamrun Spartans F.C. season =

Ħamrun Spartans
2025–26 season
- Chairman: Joseph Portelli
- Manager: Giacomo Modica
- Stadium: Victor Tedesco Stadium
- Maltese Premier League: 3rd
- Maltese FA Trophy: Quarter-finals
- Maltese Super Cup: Runners-up
- UEFA Champions League: Second qualifying round
- UEFA Europa League: Third qualifying round
- UEFA Conference League: League phase
- Top goalscorer: League: Joseph Mbong (15); All: Joseph Mbong (18)
Home colours	Away colours	Third colours

The 2025–26 season was the 119th season in the history of the Ħamrun Spartans, and their tenth consecutive in the Maltese Premier League. In addition to the domestic league, the club also participated Maltese FA Trophy, the Maltese Super Cup and UEFA Conference League.

== Season summary ==
On 20 June, Hamrun Spartans announced the signing of Junior Djile from Dubai City.

On 21 June, Hamrun Spartans announced the signings of Matías García from Floriana, Domantas Šimkus from Šiauliai and Rafael Compri from Gramadense.

On 23 June, Hamrun Spartans welcomed back Jonny Robert after he'd last played for Amazonas and the signing of N'dri Koffi from Sochaux.

On 8 July, Hamrun Spartans announced the signings of Gabriel Adragna from Igea Virtus, Merlin Hadzi and Saliou Thioune from Paradiso, Vincenzo Polito from SPAL and Mouad El Fanis from Standard Liège.

On 1 August, Hamrun Spartans announced the signing of Stijn Meijer from U Craiova and Ante Ćorić from Varaždin.

On 28 August, with a win over RFS of Latvia in the play-off round of the UEFA Conference League, Ħamrun Spartans earned their debut appearance in a major UEFA competition group or league phase. They also became the first team from Malta to play in a major UEFA competition group stage or league phase.

On 31 August, Hamrun Spartans announced the signing of Semir Smajlagić from Chungnam Asan.

On 27 November, Ħamrun Spartans made history in becoming the first Maltese club to win a match in the group stage or league phase of a UEFA competition, with a 3–1 win over Lincoln Red Imps.

On 10 January, Hamrun Spartans announced the signing of Damir Ceter from Jaguares de Córdoba, Danilo Bulevardi from Virtus Verona and Matthew Guillaumier from Panserraikos.

On 4 February, Hamrun Spartans announced the signing of free agent Ivan Inzoudine and the loan signing of Michele Carboni Torres.

On 5 February, Hamrun Spartans announced the signing of free agent Blessing Eleke.

On 6 February, Hamrun Spartans announced the signing of Kléri Serber from Toulouse.

== Squad ==
Note: Flags indicate national team as defined under FIFA eligibility rules; some limited exceptions apply. Players may hold more than one non-FIFA nationality.

No.	Pos.	Nation	Player
1	GK	MLT	Henry Bonello
2	DF	BRA	Rafael Compri
5	DF	MLT	Sven Xerri
6	MF	MLT	Matthew Guillaumier
7	FW	MLT	Shaisen Attard
8	MF	MLT	Matías García
10	MF	MLT	Joseph Mbong
12	GK	MLT	Miguel Camilleri
13	DF	ITA	Vincenzo Polito
16	MF	MLT	Scott Camilleri
17	MF	FRA	Kléri Serber
23	DF	MLT	Kydin Hili
24	FW	COL	Damir Ceter

No.	Pos.	Nation	Player
25	MF	BRA	Éder
27	MF	SRB	Ognjen Bjeličić
30	FW	NGR	Blessing Eleke
31	MF	ITA	Danilo Bulevardi
32	MF	ITA	Michele Carboni (on loan from Torres)
47	MF	BEL	Mouad El Fanis
49	FW	BRA	Jonny Robert
91	DF	BRA	Emerson
93	DF	FRA	Ivan Inzoudine
94	DF	MLT	Ryan Camenzuli
98	GK	BRA	Célio
—	FW	MAD	Sayha Seha (on loan from Catanzaro)

== Transfers ==
=== In ===
Date	Position	Nationality	Name	From	Fee	Ref.
20 June 2025	FW	(Italy)	Junior Djile	Dubai City	Undisclosed	
21 June 2025	DF	(Brazil)	Rafael Compri	Gramadense	Undisclosed	
21 June 2025	MF	(Lithuania)	Domantas Šimkus	Šiauliai	Undisclosed	
21 June 2025	MF	(Malta)	Matías García	Floriana	Undisclosed	
23 June 2025	FW	(Brazil)	Jonny Robert	Unattached	Free	
23 June 2025	FW	(Ivory Coast)	N'dri Koffi	Sochaux	Undisclosed	
8 July 2025	DF	(Italy)	Vincenzo Polito	SPAL	Undisclosed	
8 July 2025	MF	(Belgium)	Mouad El Fanis	Standard Liège	Undisclosed	
8 July 2025	FW	(Italy)	Gabriel Adragna	Igea Virtus	Undisclosed	
8 July 2025	FW	(Italy)	Saliou Thioune	Paradiso	Undisclosed	
8 July 2025	FW	(Switzerland)	Merlin Hadzi	Paradiso	Undisclosed	
1 August 2025	MF	(Croatia)	Ante Ćorić	Varaždin	Undisclosed	
1 August 2025	FW	(Netherlands)	Stijn Meijer	U Craiova	Undisclosed	
31 August 2025	FW	(Bosnia and Herzegovina)	Semir Smajlagić	Chungnam Asan	Undisclosed	
10 January 2026	MF	(Italy)	Danilo Bulevardi	Virtus Verona	Undisclosed	
10 January 2026	MF	(Malta)	Matthew Guillaumier	Panserraikos	Undisclosed	
10 January 2026	FW	(Colombia)	Damir Ceter	Jaguares de Córdoba	Undisclosed	
4 February 2026	DF	(France)	Ivan Inzoudine	Unattached	Free	
5 February 2026	FW	(Nigeria)	Blessing Eleke	Unattached	Free	
6 February 2026	MF	(France)	Kléri Serber	Toulouse	Undisclosed	

=== Loans in ===
Date	Position	Nationality	Name	From	Fee	Ref.
4 February 2026	MF	(Italy)	Michele Carboni	Torres	End of season	

== Competitions ==
=== Overall record ===
Competition	First match	Last match	Starting round	Final position	Record							
Competition	First match	Last match	Starting round	Final position	Pld	W	D	L	GF	GA	GD	Win %
Premier League	17 August 2025	2 May 2026	Matchday 1	2nd	32	18	8	6	52	21	+31	56.25
Final Four Championship	9 May 2026	15 May 2026	Semi-finals	3rd	2	1	1	0	3	2	+1	50.00
FA Trophy	3 January 2026	4 March 2026	Round of 32	Quarter-final	3	2	0	1	11	3	+8	66.67
Super Cup	10 February 2026		Final	Runners-up	1	0	0	1	1	2	−1	0.00
Champions League	9 July 2025	25 July 2025	First qualifying round	Second qualifying round	4	1	0	3	2	8	−6	25.00
Europa League	5 August 2025	14 August 2025	Third qualifying round	Third qualifying round	2	0	0	2	2	5	−3	0.00
Conference League	21 August 2025	18 December 2025	Play-off round	League phase (33rd)	8	2	1	5	7	13	−6	25.00
Total					52	24	10	18	78	54	+24	46.15

Last updated: 9 May 2026
Source: Soccerway

=== Super Cup ===
10 February 2026	Valletta	1–2 (a.e.t.)	Hamrun Spartans	Ta' Qali
15:00 CET (UTC+1)	Emerson 27' (pen.); Polito (yellow card) 56'; Bjeličić (yellow card) 80' (yellow-red card) 114'; García (yellow card) 98'	Report	Kristensen (yellow card) 26'; Miullen 81' (pen.); Alfred (yellow card) 85'; Shaw (yellow card) 90+1'; Mailson (yellow card) 104'; Halabaku 120+3'	Stadium: National Stadium

=== Premier League ===
==== Opening round ====
===== Results summary =====
Overall								Home						Away					
Pld	W	D	L	GF	GA	GD	Pts	W	D	L	GF	GA	GD	W	D	L	GF	GA	GD
11	6	4	1	15	6	+9	22	2	2	0	5	1	+4	4	2	1	10	5	+5

Last updated: 10 January 2026.
Source: Soccerway

===== Results by round =====
Round	1	2	3	4	5	6	7	8	9	10	11	12	13	14	15	16
Ground	A	H	H	A	H	A	H	A	A	A	A	H	H	H	A	H
Result	D	D	W	W	D	W	W	L	D	W	W	W	L	W	W	W
Position	5	6	5	4	4	4	3	3	3	2	2	2	2	2	2	1
Points	1	2	5	8	9	12	15	15	16	19	22	25	25	28	31	34

Updated to match(es) played on 10 January 2026. Source: Soccerway
A = Away; H = Home; W = Win; D = Draw; L = Loss; P = Postponed

===== First phase =====
====== Table ======
Pos	Team	Pld	W	D	L	GF	GA	GD	Pts	Qualification
1	Floriana	11	7	2	2	17	11	+6	23	Qualification for the Top Six
2	Ħamrun Spartans	11	6	4	1	15	6	+9	22	Qualification for the Top Six
3	Valletta	11	6	4	1	16	8	+8	22	Qualification for the Top Six
4	Sliema Wanderers	11	5	4	2	16	14	+2	19	Qualification for the Top Six
5	Marsaxlokk	11	5	3	3	14	11	+3	18	Qualification for the Top Six
6	Birkirkara	11	4	4	3	12	8	+4	16	Qualification for the Top Six
7	Hibernians	11	4	3	4	20	18	+2	15	Qualification for the Play-Out
8	Gżira United	11	3	4	4	14	18	−4	13	Qualification for the Play-Out
9	Mosta	11	3	2	6	13	19	−6	11	Qualification for the Play-Out
10	Żabbar St. Patrick	11	2	4	5	11	14	−3	10	Qualification for the Play-Out
11	Tarxien Rainbows	11	1	2	8	8	21	−13	5	Qualification for the Play-Out
12	Naxxar Lions	11	1	2	8	10	18	−8	5	Qualification for the Play-Out

Source: Malta Football Association
Rules for classification: 1) Points; 2) Head-to-head points; 3) Head-to-head goal difference; 4) Head-to-head goals scored; 5) Goal difference; 6) Goals scored; 7) Play-offs (only if needed to decide champions, teams for relegation or teams for UEFA competitions).

====== Matches ======
17 August 2025 1	Tarxien Rainbows	1–1	Ħamrun Spartans	Paola
18:00 CEST (UTC+2)	Grima (yellow card) 2'; Érico 4'; Cassar (yellow card) 44'; Murici (yellow card) 52'; Tavinho (yellow card) 75'	Report	Šimkus (yellow card) 34'; Micallef (yellow card) 40'; Polito 76'	Stadium: Tony Bezzina Stadium; Attendance: 895; Referee: Ezekiel Barbara

31 August 2025 2	Ħamrun Spartans	1–1	Valletta	Ta' Qali
18:30 CEST (UTC+2)	Hadzi 34'; Xerri (yellow card) 67'; Koffi (yellow card) 88'	Report	Yuri 12'	Stadium: National Stadium; Attendance: 4,239; Referee: Matthew De Gabriele

13 September 2025 3	Ħamrun Spartans	2–0	Mosta	Ta' Qali
16:00 CEST (UTC+2)	Mbong 49'; El Fanis (yellow card) 68' (goal) 80'; Micallef (yellow card) 84'	Report	Sciberras (yellow card) 42'; Hurtado (yellow card) 46'; Emmanuel (yellow card) 58'; Udoh (yellow card) 80'	Stadium: National Stadium; Attendance: 847; Referee: Alex Johnson

16 September 2025 4	Żabbar St. Patrick	0–1	Ħamrun Spartans	Paola
17:45 CEST (UTC+2)	de Paiva (yellow card) 11'; Gambarte (yellow card) 69'; Fontanella (yellow card) 78'; Tchaouna (yellow card) 88'	Report	Compri 22'; Emerson (yellow card) 66'; Šimkus (yellow card) 69'; Polito (yellow card) 90+4'	Stadium: Tony Bezzina Stadium; Attendance: 1,035; Referee: Slobodan Petrović

20 September 2025 5	Ħamrun Spartans	0–0	Valletta	Ta' Qali
16:00 CEST (UTC+2)	Polito (yellow card) 23'	Report	Fonseca (yellow card) 89'; Bonilla (yellow card) 90+2'; Martínez (yellow card) 90+2'	Stadium: National Stadium; Attendance: 855; Referee: Fyodor Zammit

23 September 2025 6	Marsaxlokk	0–2	Ħamrun Spartans	Paola
17:45 CEST (UTC+2)	Corbalan (yellow card) 45+1'; Santos (yellow card) 69'; Mafoumbi (yellow card)	Report	Emerson (yellow card) 10'; El Fanis 84' (yellow card) 90+3'; Koffi 90' (pen.)	Stadium: Tony Bezzina Stadium; Attendance: 848; Referee: Ishmael Barbara

27 September 2025 7	Ħamrun Spartans	2–0	Hibernians	Ta' Qali
17:30 CEST (UTC+2)	Smajlagić 6'; Bjeličić (yellow card) 38'; Mbong 60'; Koffi (yellow card) 72'	Report	Cacho (yellow card) 72'	Stadium: Centenary Stadium; Attendance: 1,117; Referee: Alex Johnson

5 October 2025 8	Sliema Wanderers	2–0	Ħamrun Spartans	Paola
15:30 CEST (UTC+2)	Fernandinho 19' (yellow card) 42'; Alcino (yellow card) 56'; Plut 69'; Agu (yellow card) 78'	Report	Smajlagić (red card) 30'; Koffi (yellow card) 89'; Micallef (yellow card) 90+6'	Stadium: Tony Bezzina Stadium; Attendance: 1,261; Referee: Philip Farrugia

26 October 2025 9	Naxxar Lions	1–1	Ħamrun Spartans	Hamrun
17:00 CET (UTC+1)	Bolaños 18'; Rosiel (yellow card) 58'; Baiano (yellow card) 89'; Portelli (red card) 90+3'	Report	Thioune 14'; Polito (yellow card) 90+2'; Emerson (yellow card) 90+5'	Stadium: Victor Tedesco Stadium; Attendance: 950; Referee: Joseph Scerri

29 October 2025 10	Floriana	1–3	Ħamrun Spartans	Paola
18:45 CET (UTC+1)	Grech (yellow card) 16'; Vella (yellow card) 45+4'; Scerri (yellow card) 51'; Jah 82'	Report	Koffi 10' (yellow card) 50'; Camenzuli (yellow card) 29'; García 45', 47'; Eder (red card) 51'; El Fanis (yellow card) 85'	Stadium: Tony Bezzina Stadium; Attendance: 1,389; Referee: Fyodor Zammit

1 November 2025 11	Birkirkara	0–2	Ħamrun Spartans	Paola
19:00 CET (UTC+1)	Maydana (yellow card) 14'; Zammit (yellow card) 19' (red card) 90+3'; Dimech (yellow card) 30'; Lacunza (yellow card) 49'	Report	Emerson 12'; García (yellow card) 20'; Smajlagić 24' (pen.); Bjeličić (yellow card) 45'	Stadium: Tony Bezzina Stadium; Attendance: 1,883; Referee: Slobodan Petrović

===== Top Six =====
====== Table ======
Pos	Team	Pld	W	D	L	GF	GA	GD	Pts	Qualification
1	Ħamrun Spartans (W)	16	10	4	2	26	10	+16	34	Opening Round Winners
2	Floriana	16	10	3	3	23	15	+8	33	
3	Valletta	16	8	5	3	20	11	+9	29	
4	Sliema Wanderers	16	7	5	4	21	19	+2	26	
5	Marsaxlokk	16	7	4	5	20	16	+4	25	
6	Birkirkara	16	4	4	8	15	22	−7	16	

Source: Malta Football Association
Rules for classification: 1) Points; 2) Head-to-head points; 3) Head-to-head goal difference; 4) Head-to-head goals scored; 5) Goal difference; 6) Goals scored; 7) Play-offs (only if needed to decide champions, teams for relegation or teams for UEFA competitions).
(W) Opening Round Winners

====== Matches ======
22 November 2025 12	Ħamrun Spartans	1–0	Valletta	Ta' Qali
16:00 CET (UTC+1)	Bjelicic 47'; El Fanis (yellow card) 64'	Report	Yuri (yellow card) 45+3'; Paiber (yellow card) 88'	Stadium: National Stadium; Attendance: 3,443; Referee: Slobodan Petrović

14 December 2025 13	Ħamrun Spartans	1–3	Marsaxlokk	Ta' Qali
16:00 CET (UTC+1)	García (yellow card) 32'; Koffi 45+2'; Micallef (yellow card) 68'	Report	Tsoumou 19'; Minala 44'; Weder 59' (yellow card) 59'; Aguirre (yellow card) 90'	Stadium: National Stadium; Attendance: 790; Referee: Ezekiel Bárbara

21 December 2025 14	Ħamrun Spartans	6–1	Birkirkara	Ta' Qali
16:00 CET (UTC+1)	El Fanis 36'; Eder (yellow card) 45'; Bonello (yellow card) 46'; García 50', 71'; Thioune 66'; Mbong 74'; Koffi 90'	Report	Makoma 45'; Marjanovic (yellow card) 57'	Stadium: National Stadium; Attendance: 1,014; Referee: Ishmael Barbara

7 January 2026 15	Floriana	0–2	Ħamrun Spartans	Ta' Qali
20:00 CET (UTC+1)	Grech (yellow card) 70'	Report	Eder (yellow card) 10'; Polito (yellow card) 40'; Jonny 76'; Čađenović 81'	Stadium: Centenary Stadium; Attendance: 1,137; Referee: Slobodan Petrović

10 January 2026 16	Ħamrun Spartans	1–0	Sliema Wanderers	Paola
16:00 CET (UTC+1)	Camenzuli (yellow card) 26'; Ceter 29'; Eder (yellow card) 43'; Compri (yellow card) 50'	Report	Plut (yellow card) 45+1'; Wescley (yellow card) 76'	Stadium: Tony Bezzina Stadium; Attendance: 1,262; Referee: Alex Johnson

==== Closing round ====
===== Results summary =====
Overall								Home						Away					
Pld	W	D	L	GF	GA	GD	Pts	W	D	L	GF	GA	GD	W	D	L	GF	GA	GD
11	6	4	1	16	4	+12	22	5	2	0	14	2	+12	1	2	1	2	2	0

Last updated: 15 March 2026.
Source: Soccerway

===== Results by round =====
Round	1	2	3	4	5	6	7	8	9	10	11
Ground	H	A	H	A	H	H	A	H	H	H	A
Result	W	D	W	D	W	D	W	W	D	W	L
Position	2	2	2	2	2	2	2	2	2	1	2
Points	3	4	7	8	11	12	15	18	19	22	22

Updated to match(es) played on 15 March 2026. Source: Soccerway
A = Away; H = Home; W = Win; D = Draw; L = Loss; P = Postponed

===== First phase =====
====== Table ======
Pos	Team	Pld	W	D	L	GF	GA	GD	Pts	Qualification
1	Floriana	11	7	4	0	20	7	+13	25	Qualification for the Top Six
2	Ħamrun Spartans	11	6	4	1	16	4	+12	22	Qualification for the Top Six
3	Marsaxlokk	11	5	4	2	12	12	0	19	Qualification for the Top Six
4	Naxxar Lions	11	5	3	3	20	18	+2	18	Qualification for the Top Six
5	Valletta	11	4	5	2	16	7	+9	17 (Note: Head-to-head points: Valletta 3; Gżira United 0.)	Qualification for the Top Six
6	Gżira United	11	5	2	4	14	12	+2	17	Qualification for the Top Six
7	Sliema Wanderers	11	4	4	3	10	11	−1	16	Qualification for the Play-Out
8	Birkirkara	11	3	4	4	12	12	0	13	Qualification for the Play-Out
9	Hibernians	11	3	2	6	11	17	−6	11	Qualification for the Play-Out
10	Żabbar St. Patrick	11	2	4	5	13	15	−2	10	Qualification for the Play-Out
11	Tarxien Rainbows	11	1	3	7	9	21	−12	6	Qualification for the Play-Out
12	Mosta	11	1	1	9	7	24	−17	4	Qualification for the Play-Out

Source: Malta Football Association
Rules for classification: 1) Points; 2) Head-to-head points; 3) Head-to-head goal difference; 4) Head-to-head goals scored; 5) Goal difference; 6) Goals scored; 7) Play-offs (only if needed to decide champions, teams for relegation or teams for UEFA competitions).

====== Matches ======
17 January 2026 1	Ħamrun Spartans	2–1	Tarxien Rainbows	Hamrun
16:30 CET (UTC+1)	Guillaumier 44'; Jonny 62'	Report	Musulin (yellow card) 54'; Lokosa 67'	Stadium: Victor Tedesco Stadium; Attendance: 887; Referee: Emanuel Grech

24 January 2026 2	Valletta	0–0	Ħamrun Spartans	Paola
16:00 CET (UTC+1)	Mbende (yellow card) 3'; (yellow card) 32'; Borg (yellow card) 52'; Thaylor (yellow card) 69'; Maringá (yellow card) 90+1'	Report	Camenzuli (yellow card) 31'; Bjeličić (yellow card) 48'; García (yellow card) 90+5'	Stadium: Tony Bezzina Stadium; Attendance: 2,477; Referee: Matthew De Gabriele

31 January 2026 3	Ħamrun Spartans	2–0	Sliema Wanderers	Paola
16:30 CET (UTC+1)	Mbong 11'; Bjeličić (yellow card) 28' Célio (yellow card) 90+3'; Ceter 90+6'	Report		Stadium: Tony Bezzina Stadium; Attendance: 862; Referee: Ishmael Barbara

3 February 2026 4	Gżira United	0–0	Ħamrun Spartans	Hamrun
19:00 CET (UTC+1)	Bonilla (yellow card) 64'; Van de Bovenkamp (yellow card) 86'	Report	Jonny (yellow card) 90+6'	Stadium: Victor Tedesco Stadium; Attendance: 585; Referee: Slobodan Petrović

7 February 2026 5	Ħamrun Spartans	4–0	Naxxar Lions	Ta' Qali
19:00 CET (UTC+1)	Mbong 25', 41'; Camenzuli (yellow card) 39'; Ceter 56', 69'	Report	Costa (yellow card) 20'; Pahama (yellow card) 24'	Stadium: Centenary Stadium; Attendance: 773; Referee: Philip Farrugia

13 February 2026 6	Ħamrun Spartans	0–0	Żabbar St. Patrick	Ta' Qali
21:00 CET (UTC+1)	Xerri (yellow card) 33'; Bulevardi (yellow card) 40'; García (yellow card) 75'	Report	Cejas (yellow card) 40'; Djaló (red card) 64'; Colombo (yellow card) 85'	Stadium: National Stadium; Attendance: 614; Referee: Ezekiel Barbara

18 February 2026 7	Hibernians	0–1	Ħamrun Spartans	Paola
18:30 CET (UTC+1)	Diakité (yellow card) 16'; Cleiton (yellow card) 23'; Hernandez (yellow card) 45+3'	Report	Jonny (yellow card) 3'; Bjeličić (yellow card) 45+2'; Mbong 57'	Stadium: Tony Bezzina Stadium; Referee: Daniel Portelli

23 February 2026 8	Ħamrun Spartans	2–0	Marsaxlokk	Hamrun
20:00 CET (UTC+1)	Eleke 61'; Polito (yellow card) 63'; Attard (yellow card) 71'; Mbong (yellow card) 79' (goal) 80'; García (yellow card) 80'	Report	Corbalan (yellow card) 51'; Pepe (yellow card) 86'	Stadium: Victor Tedesco Stadium; Referee: Alex Johnson

1 March 2026 9	Ħamrun Spartans	1–1	Floriana	Paola
16:00 CET (UTC+1)	Emerson (yellow card) 69'; Guillaumier 90+6'; Bjeličić (yellow card) 90+6'	Report	Dervišagić 12'; Beerman (yellow card) 81'; Lonardelli (yellow card) 90+6'	Stadium: Tony Bezzina Stadium; Referee: Glen Tonna

8 March 2026 10	Ħamrun Spartans	3–0	Birkirkara	Paola
14:00 CET (UTC+1)	Guillaumier 7'; Compri (yellow card) 36'; Mbong 75', 78' (pen.)	Report	Macula (yellow card) 36'; Garcia (yellow card) 75'	Stadium: Tony Bezzina Stadium; Referee: Ishmael Barbara

15 March 2026 11	Mosta	2–1	Hamrun Spartans	Ta' Qali
16:00 CET (UTC+1)	Oderinde (yellow card) 24'; Portelli 43', 68' (pen.); Victor (yellow card) 55'; Fernandes (yellow card) 63'	Report	Guillaumier (yellow card) 42'; Camenzuli (yellow card) 67'; Eleke 76'; Bulevardi (yellow card) 80'; Polito (yellow card) 83'; Xerri (yellow card) 90+7'	Stadium: National Stadium; Referee: Ezekiel Barbara

===== Top Six =====
====== Table ======
Pos	Team	Pld	W	D	L	GF	GA	GD	Pts	
1	Floriana (W)	15	10	4	1	27	12	+15	34	Closing Round Winners
2	Ħamrun Spartans	15	8	4	3	25	9	+16	28	
3	Marsaxlokk	15	8	4	3	19	18	+1	28	
4	Valletta	15	5	6	4	19	12	+7	21	
5	Gżira United	15	6	3	6	17	16	+1	21	
6	Naxxar Lions	15	5	5	5	21	23	−2	20	

Updated to match(es) played on 26 April 2026. Source: Malta Football Association
Rules for classification: 1) Points; 2) Points in regular season; 3) Head-to-head points in regular season; 4) Head-to-head goal difference in regular season; 5) Head-to-head goals scored in regular season; 6) Head-to-head away goals scored in regular season (if two teams tied); 7) Goal difference; 8) Goals scored; 9) Fair play ranking; 10) Drawing of lots.
(W) Closing Round Winners

====== Matches ======
11 April 2026 12	Marsaxlokk	3–2	Ħamrun Spartans	Gozo
18:30 CEST (UTC+2)	El Hasni 6' (yellow card) 38'; Aguirre (yellow card) 45+2'; Šimkus 45+5'; Minala (yellow card) 87'; Caruana 90+8'	Report	Emerson (yellow card) 13' (yellow-red card) 53' (goal) 34' (pen.); Bulevardi (yellow card) 38'; Mbong 73'	Stadium: Gozo Stadium; Referee: Ishmael Barbara

15 April 2026 13	Hamrun Spartans	0–1	Gżira United	Ta' Qali
19:00 CEST (UTC+2)	Ceter (yellow card) 38'; Polito (yellow card) 64'; Bjeličić (yellow card) 83'	Report	Riascos (yellow card) 23'; A.Borg (yellow card) 88'; Samurai 90+8'	Stadium: National Stadium; Referee: Ezekiel Bárbara

19 April 2026 14	Hamrun Spartans	3–0	Naxxar Lions	Ta' Qali
17:30 CEST (UTC+2)	Ceter (yellow card) 35'; Gustavo 44' (o.g.); El Fanis (yellow card) 60'; Mbong 77' (pen.)	Report	Guehi (yellow card) 54'; Costa (yellow card) 70'	Stadium: National Stadium; Referee: Daniel Portelli

25 April 2026 15	Floriana	1–4	Hamrun Spartans	Ta' Qali
16:00 CEST (UTC+2)	Scerri 23' (pen.); Areias (yellow card) 44'; Beerman (yellow card) 71'; Mabea (yellow card) 77'; Rodgers (yellow card) 80'	Report	Eleke 7' (yellow card) 24'; Polito (yellow card) 34'; Mbong 78', 86'; Carboni 90+1'	Stadium: National Stadium; Referee: Ishmael Barbara

2 May 2026 16	Valletta	2–1	Hamrun Spartans	Ta' Qali
17:00 CEST (UTC+2)	Tavares (yellow card) 45+2'; Mendoza 54'; Thaylor (yellow card) 72'; Adebayo 83'; Maringá (yellow card) 90+7'	Report	Compri 58'; Bulevardi (yellow card) 86'; Emerson (yellow card) 90+1'; Eleke (yellow card) 90+7'	Stadium: National Stadium; Referee: Fyodor Zammit

==== Aggregate table ====
Pos	Team	Pld	W	D	L	GF	GA	GD	Pts	
1	Floriana	32	21	7	4	51	27	+24	70	Qualification for the Final Four
2	Ħamrun Spartans	32	18	8	6	52	21	+31	62	Qualification for the Final Four
3	Marsaxlokk	32	16	8	8	42	36	+6	56	Qualification for the Final Four
4	Valletta	32	14	11	7	41	24	+17	53	Qualification for the Final Four
5	Sliema Wanderers	32	12	12	8	37	36	+1	48	
6	Gżira United	32	12	7	13	38	43	−5	43	
7	Hibernians	32	10	9	13	45	49	−4	39	
8	Birkirkara	32	8	11	13	29	36	−7	35 (Note: Head-to-head points: Birkirkara 4, Naxxar Lions 1.)	
9	Naxxar Lions	32	9	8	15	41	51	−10	35	Qualification for the Relegation play-off
10	Żabbar St. Patrick	32	6	13	13	41	44	−3	31	Qualification for the Relegation play-off
11	Mosta	32	6	8	18	34	58	−24	26	Qualification for the Relegation play-off
12	Tarxien Rainbows	32	4	10	18	32	58	−26	22	Qualification for the Relegation play-off

Updated to match(es) played on 2 May 2026. Source: Malta Football Association
Rules for classification: 1) Points; 2) Head-to-head points; 3) Head-to-head goal difference; 4) Head-to-head goals scored; 5) Goal difference; 6) Goals scored; 7) Play-offs (only if needed to decide champions, teams for relegation or teams for UEFA competitions).

==== Final Four Championship ====
9 May 2026 Semi-finals	Marsaxlokk	2–1 (a.e.t.)	Hamrun Spartans	Ta' Qali
20:30 CEST (UTC+2)	Minala 38' (pen.), 98' (pen.) (yellow card) 65'; Mafoumbi (yellow card) 64'; Šimkus (yellow card) 74'; Dodo (yellow card) 85'	Report	García (yellow card) 56' (goal) 89'; Xerri (yellow card) 90+6'; Polito (yellow card) 96'; Mbong (yellow card) 120+1'	Stadium: National Stadium; Referee: Glen Tonna

15 May 2026 Third place play-off	Valletta	0–2	Hamrun Spartans	Ta' Qali
19:00 CEST (UTC+2)	Mbende (yellow card) 16'; Yankam (yellow card) 73'	Report	Mbong 1'; Ceter 7'; Serber (yellow card) 57'	Stadium: National Stadium; Referee: Alex Johnson

=== FA Trophy ===
3 January 2026 Round of 32	Hamrun Spartans	5–0	Victoria Hotspurs	Hamrun
14:00 CET (UTC+1)	Attard 5'; Mbong 61'; Camenzuli 63'; Koffi 72'; Čađenović 73'	Report	Mercieca (yellow card) 67'	Stadium: Victor Tedesco Stadium; Referee: Daniel Portelli

27 January 2026 Round of 16	Hamrun Spartans	5–0	Fgura United	Ta' Qali
18:15 CET (UTC+1)	Bulevardi 6'; Bjeličić (yellow card) 25'; Attard 51', 64'; Robert 78'; Ceter 90+2'	Report	Abdelghani (yellow card) 5'; Buhagiar (yellow card) 15' (yellow-red card) 40'	Stadium: Centenary Stadium; Referee: Daniel Portelli

4 March 2026 Quarter-final	Valletta	3–1 (a.e.t.)	Hamrun Spartans	Ta' Qali
19:00 CET (UTC+1)	Mendoza (yellow card) 43'; Yankam 60'; Azzopardi (yellow card) 90+3'; Maringá (yellow card) 95'; Meijer 115'; Paiber 120+7'	Report	Compri (yellow card) 42'; El Fanis 67'; Polito (yellow card) 93'	Stadium: National Stadium; Referee: Slobodan Petrović

=== UEFA Champions League ===
==== Qualifying rounds ====
9 July 2025 First qualifying round 1st leg	Žalgiris (Lithuania)	2–0	(Malta) Hamrun Spartans	Vilnius, Lithuania
18:00 CEST (UTC+2)	Antal 59'; Hadji 85'	Report	Compri (yellow card) 78'	Stadium: LFF Stadium; Attendance: 3,176; Referee: Sandi Putros (Denmark)

15 July 2025 First qualifying round 2nd leg	Hamrun Spartans (Malta)	2–0 (a.e.t.) (2–2 agg.) (11–10 p)	(Lithuania) Žalgiris	Ta' Qali, Malta
19:00 CEST (UTC+2)	Čađenović (yellow card) 14'; Thioune 35'; Mbong 41'; Šimkus (yellow card) 43'; Camenzuli (yellow card) 97'	Report	Radenović (yellow card) 24' (yellow-red card) 114'; Salčinović (yellow card) 73'; Mihajlović (yellow card) 90+5'	Stadium: Centenary Stadium; Attendance: 1,247; Referee: Matteo Mercenaro (Italy)
	Penalties
	Emerson (penalty scored); Čađenović (penalty missed); El Fanis (penalty scored); Polito (penalty scored); Jonny (penalty scored); Thioune (penalty missed); Micallef (penalty scored); Camenzuli (penalty scored); Bjeličić (penalty scored); Bonello (penalty scored); Emerson (penalty scored); Jonny (penalty missed); Polito (penalty scored); Čađenović (penalty scored)		(penalty scored) Antal; (penalty missed) Salčinović; (penalty scored) Moutachy; (penalty scored) Ofori; (penalty scored) Mihajlović; (penalty missed) Dumančić; (penalty scored) Youla; (penalty scored) Devens; (penalty scored) Lukaševič; (penalty scored) Olses; (penalty scored) Antal; (penalty missed) Salčinović; (penalty scored) Moutachy; (penalty missed) Ofori
Note: Match played at the Centenary Stadium, in Ta' Qali, instead of Hamrun Spartans's regular venue, the Victor Tedesco Stadium, in Hamrun, which did not meet UEFA requirements.

22 July 2025 Second qualifying round 1st leg	Hamrun Spartans (Malta)	0–3	(Ukraine) Dynamo Kyiv	Paola, Malta
19:00 CEST (UTC+2)	Bjeličić (yellow card) 45+1'; Šimkus (yellow card) 50'; Eder (yellow card) 70'	Report	Vanat 13' (yellow card) 74'; Yarmolenko (yellow card) 55'; Popov (yellow card) 55'; Buyalskyi 76'; Voloshyn 90+2'	Stadium: Tony Bezzina Stadium; Attendance: 1,760; Referee: César Soto Grado (Spain)
Note: Match played at the Tony Bezzina Stadium, in Paola, instead of Hamrun Spartans's regular venue, the Victor Tedesco Stadium, in Hamrun, which did not meet UEFA requirements.

29 July 2025 Second qualifying round 2nd leg	Dynamo Kyiv (Ukraine)	3–0 (6–0 agg.)	(Malta) Hamrun Spartans	Lublin, Poland
19:00 CEST (UTC+2)	Vanat 28'; Brazhko 35'; Vivcharenko (yellow card) 69'; Mykhavko 82'; Tymchyk (yellow card) 85'	Report	Polito (yellow card) 86'	Stadium: Arena Lublin; Attendance: 2,035; Referee: Jakob Alexander Sundberg (Denmark)
Note: Due to the Russian invasion of Ukraine, Ukrainian teams were required to play their home matches at neutral venues until further notice.

=== UEFA Europa League ===
==== Qualifying rounds ====
5 August 2025 Third qualifying round 1st leg	Hamrun Spartans (Malta)	1–2	(Israel) Maccabi Tel Aviv	Paola, Malta
19:00 CEST (UTC+2)	Polito (yellow card) 9'; Bjeličić (yellow card) 13'; Koffi 71' (pen.); Emerson (yellow card) 90+1'	Report	Nicolaescu (yellow card) 9'; Sissokho (yellow card) 52'; Revivo 79'; Stojić (yellow card) 85'; Madmon 90+6'	Stadium: Tony Bezzina Stadium; Attendance: 1,097; Referee: Kristo Tohver (Estonia)
Note: Match played at the Tony Bezzina Stadium, in Paola, instead of Hamrun Spartans's regular venue, the Victor Tedesco Stadium, in Hamrun, which did not meet UEFA requirements.

14 August 2025 Third qualifying round 2nd leg	Maccabi Tel Aviv (Israel)	3–1 (5–2 agg.)	(Malta) Hamrun Spartans	Bačka Topola, Serbia
20:00 CEST (UTC+2)	Shahar 37', 45+2'; Davida 69'; Davida (yellow card) 90+3'	Report	Camenzuli (yellow card) 10'; Emerson (penalty missed) 28'; Čađenović (yellow card) 41'; Mbong 43'; El Fanis (yellow card) 90+1'	Stadium: TSC Arena; Attendance: 145; Referee: Rohit Saggi (Norway)
Note: Due to the Gaza war, Israeli teams were required to play their home matches at neutral venues until further notice.

=== UEFA Conference League ===
==== Qualifying rounds ====
21 August 2025 Play-off round 1st leg	Hamrun Spartans (Malta)	1–0	(Latvia) RFS	Ta' Qali, Malta
19:00 CEST (UTC+2)	Thioune (yellow card) 34' (goal) 55'; Eder (yellow card) 44'; García (yellow card) 81'; Camenzuli (yellow card) 90+2'	Report	Lipušček (yellow card) 85'; Diomandé (yellow card) 88'	Stadium: National Stadium; Attendance: 1,401; Referee: Ashot Ghaltakhchyan (Armenia)
Note: Match played at the National Stadium in Ta' Qali, instead of Hamrun Spartans's regular venue, the Victor Tedesco Stadium, in Hamrun, which did not meet UEFA requirements.

28 August 2025 Play-off round 2nd leg	RFS (Latvia)	2–2 (2–3 agg.)	(Malta) Hamrun Spartans	Riga, Latvia
19:00 CEST (UTC+2)	Panić 17' (pen.) (yellow card) 56'; Mareš (yellow card) 18'; Lemajić 87'	Report	Thioune 12'; Emerson (yellow card) 14'; Bonello (yellow card) 18'; Bjeličić (yellow card) 19'; Polito 67'; Ćorić (yellow card) 86'; Koffi (yellow card) 90+6'	Stadium: LNK Sporta Parks; Attendance: 1,674; Referee: Horațiu Feșnic (Romania)

==== League Phase ====
Pos	Team	Pld	W	D	L	GF	GA	GD	Pts
31	(Football Association of Ireland) Shamrock Rovers	6	1	1	4	7	13	−6	4
32	(Swedish Football Association) BK Häcken	6	0	3	3	5	8	−3	3
33	(Malta Football Association) Hamrun Spartans	6	1	0	5	4	11	−7	3
34	(Football Association of Ireland) Shelbourne	6	0	2	4	0	7	−7	2
35	(Scottish Football Association) Aberdeen	6	0	2	4	3	14	−11	2

Source: UEFA
Rules for classification: League phase tiebreakers

Round	1	2	3	4	5	6
Ground	A	H	A	H	H	A
Result	L	L	L	W	L	L
Position	23	32	35	30	32	33
Points	0	0	0	3	3	3

Source: UEFA
A = Away; H = Home; W = Win; D = Draw; L = Loss

Win Draw Loss Fixtures

2 October 2025 1	Jagiellonia Białystok (Poland)	1–0	(Malta) Hamrun Spartans	Białystok, Poland
18:45 CEST (UTC+2)	Pululu (yellow card) 51'; Imaz 57'; Wdowik (yellow card) 90+3'	Report	Polito (yellow card) 51'; Eder (yellow card) 53'; Mbong (red card) 62'	Stadium: Stadion Miejski; Attendance: 17,469; Referee: Igor Stojchevski (North Macedonia)

23 October 2025 2	Hamrun Spartans (Malta)	0–1	(Switzerland) Lausanne-Sport	Ta' Qali, Malta
21:00 CEST (UTC+2)	Hadzi (yellow card) 28'; Emerson (yellow card) 78'; Čađenović (yellow card) 90+6'	Report	Diakité 38'; Roche (yellow card) 43'; Abdallah (yellow card) 87'; Custodio (yellow card) 90+5'	Stadium: National Stadium; Attendance: 3,198; Referee: Henrik Nalbandyan (Armenia)
Note: Match played at the National Stadium in Ta' Qali, instead of Hamrun Spartans's regular venue, the Victor Tedesco Stadium, in Hamrun, which did not meet UEFA requirements.

6 November 2025 3	Samsunspor (Turkey)	3–0	(Malta) Hamrun Spartans	Samsun, Turkey
18:45 CET (UTC+1)	Holse 18'; Kılınç 58'; Mouandilmadji 77'	Report	Mbong (yellow card) 22'	Stadium: Samsun 19 Mayıs Stadium; Attendance: 17,600; Referee: Bulat Sariyev (Kazakhstan)

27 November 2025 4	Hamrun Spartans (Malta)	3–1	(Gibraltar) Lincoln Red Imps	Ta' Qali, Malta
18:45 CET (UTC+1)	Eder (yellow card) 13'; Bjeličić (yellow card) 45'; Koffi (yellow card) 51'; Polito (red card) 56'; El Fanis 65'; Smajlagić 74'; Ćorić 90+2'; Bonello (yellow card) 90+3'	Report	Torrilla (red card) 41'; Mandi (yellow card) 51'; Lopes 57'; Hankins (yellow card) 65'	Stadium: National Stadium; Attendance: 2,134; Referee: Jovan Kochevski (North Macedonia)
Note: Match played at the National Stadium in Ta' Qali, instead of Hamrun Spartans's regular venue, the Victor Tedesco Stadium, in Hamrun, which did not meet UEFA requirements.

11 December 2025 5	Hamrun Spartans (Malta)	0–2	(Ukraine) Shakhtar Donetsk	Ta' Qali, Malta
21:00 CET (UTC+1)	Mbong (yellow card) 52'; García (yellow card) 58'	Report	Konoplya (yellow card) 10'; Ocheretko (yellow card) 50'; Meirelles 61'; Isaque 64'; Eguinaldo (yellow card) 90'	Stadium: National Stadium; Attendance: 2,578; Referee: Florian Badstübner (Germany)
Note: Match played at the National Stadium in Ta' Qali, instead of Hamrun Spartans's regular venue, the Victor Tedesco Stadium, in Hamrun, which did not meet UEFA requirements.

18 December 2025 6	Shamrock Rovers (Republic of Ireland)	3–1	(Malta) Hamrun Spartans	Dublin, Republic of Ireland
21:00 CET (UTC+1)	Burke 14' (pen.); Grant 45+4'; Cleary (yellow card) 51'; Matthews (yellow card) 64'; Kovalevskis (yellow card) 71'; C.O'Sullivan (yellow card) 86'; McGovern 90+3'	Report	Koffi 20'; Mbong (red card) 27'; El Fanis (yellow card) 45'	Stadium: Tallaght Stadium; Attendance: 5,810; Referee: Marek Radina (Czech Republic)

== Statistics ==
As of match played 15 May 2026

=== Appearances and goals ===
No.	Pos	Nat	Player	Total		Premier League		FA Trophy		Supercup		Champions League		Europa League		Conference League	
No.	Pos	Nat	Player	Apps	Goals	Apps	Goals	Apps	Goals	Apps	Goals	Apps	Goals	Apps	Goals	Apps	Goals
1	GK	(Malta) MLT	Henry Bonello	44	0	28	0	1	0	1	0	4	0	2	0	8	0
2	DF	(Brazil) BRA	Rafael Compri	47	2	28+2	2	2	0	1	0	4	0	2	0	8	0
5	DF	(Malta) MLT	Sven Xerri	39	0	16+15	0	2+1	0	0	0	0+1	0	0	0	0+4	0
6	MF	(Malta) MLT	Matthew Guillaumier	21	3	18	3	2	0	1	0	0	0	0	0	0	0
7	FW	(Malta) MLT	Shaisen Attard	28	3	9+13	0	3	3	1	0	0	0	0	0	0+2	0
8	MF	(Malta) MLT	Matías García	41	5	27+1	5	1	0	1	0	2+1	0	1+1	0	4+2	0
10	MF	(Malta) MLT	Joseph Mbong	51	18	29+5	15	2+1	1	1	0	4	1	2	1	7	0
13	DF	(Italy) ITA	Vincenzo Polito	45	2	29+1	1	2	0	1	0	3	0	1+1	0	7	1
16	MF	(Malta) MLT	Scott Camilleri	6	0	0+4	0	0+2	0	0	0	0	0	0	0	0	0
17	MF	(France) FRA	Kléri Serber	11	0	3+8	0	0	0	0	0	0	0	0	0	0	0
24	FW	(Colombia) COL	Damir Ceter	14	7	11+1	6	0+1	1	1	0	0	0	0	0	0	0
25	MF	(Brazil) BRA	Eder	37	0	10+11	0	2	0	0+1	0	2+2	0	2	0	5+2	0
27	MF	(Serbia) SRB	Ognjen Bjeličić	40	1	22+2	1	2	0	0	0	4	0	2	0	8	0
30	FW	(Nigeria) NGR	Blessing Eleke	14	3	4+8	3	1	0	0+1	0	0	0	0	0	0	0
31	MF	(Italy) ITA	Danilo Bulevardi	19	1	10+6	0	2	1	1	0	0	0	0	0	0	0
32	MF	(Italy) ITA	Michele Carboni	10	1	2+6	1	0+1	0	0+1	0	0	0	0	0	0	0
47	MF	(Belgium) BEL	Mouad El Fanis	36	5	12+10	3	1+1	1	0	0	0+3	0	0+2	0	1+6	1
49	FW	(Brazil) BRA	Jonny Robert	19	3	5+10	2	0+2	1	0+1	0	0+1	0	0	0	0	0
55	MF	(Malta) MLT	Kian Vella	1	0	0	0	0+1	0	0	0	0	0	0	0	0	0
91	MF	(Brazil) BRA	Marcelina Emerson	44	3	23+4	2	2+1	0	1	1	2+2	0	1+1	0	6+1	0
93	DF	(France) FRA	Ivan Inzoudine	8	0	3+4	0	0	0	0+1	0	0	0	0	0	0	0
94	DF	(Malta) MLT	Ryan Camenzuli	39	1	20+2	0	2+1	1	1	0	4	0	2	0	7	0
98	GK	(Brazil) BRA	Célio	8	0	6	0	2	0	0	0	0	0	0	0	0	0
Players away on loan:
6	MF	(Malta) MLT	Daniel Letherby	5	0	2+3	0	0	0	0	0	0	0	0	0	0	0
Players who left Hamrun Spartans during the season:
3	DF	(Malta) MLT	Nikolai Micallef	16	0	6+3	0	1+1	0	0	0	1+3	0	0	0	1	0
9	FW	(Italy) ITA	Saliou Thioune	27	5	8+5	2	0+1	0	0	0	0+4	1	2	0	6+1	2
14	FW	(Bosnia and Herzegovina) BIH	Semir Smajlagić	14	3	7+2	2	0	0	0	0	0	0	0	0	2+3	1
17	FW	(Italy) ITA	Gabriel Adragna	1	0	0	0	0	0	0	0	0+1	0	0	0	0	0
19	FW	(Ivory Coast) CIV	N'dri Koffi	32	7	8+8	4	2	1	0	0	4	0	2	1	8	1
20	MF	(Montenegro) MNE	Jovan Čađenović	26	2	8+5	1	1	1	0	0	4	0	2	0	1+5	0
24	MF	(Croatia) CRO	Ante Ćorić	20	1	6+4	0	0	0	0	0	0	0	1+1	0	5+3	1
28	FW	(Albania) ALB	Redon Mihana	3	0	1	0	0	0	0	0	1	0	0+1	0	0	0
33	MF	(Lithuania) LTU	Domantas Šimkus	22	0	5+7	0	0	0	0	0	4	0	0+1	0	3+2	0
45	FW	(Italy) ITA	Junior Djile	2	0	0	0	0	0	0	0	0+2	0	0	0	0	0
77	FW	(Switzerland) SUI	Merlin Hadzi	16	1	6+5	1	0	0	0	0	1+1	0	0+1	0	1+1	0
99	FW	(Netherlands) NED	Stijn Meijer	6	0	1	0	0	0	0	0	0	0	0+1	0	0+4	0

=== Goal scorers ===
Place	Position	Nation	Number	Name	Premier League	FA Trophy	Supercup	Champions League	Europa League	Conference League	Total
1	MF	(Malta)	10	Joseph Mbong	15	1	0	1	1	0	18
2	FW	(Colombia)	24	Damir Ceter	6	1	0	0	0	0	7
2	FW	(Ivory Coast)	19	N'dri Koffi	4	1	0	0	1	1	7
4	MF	(Malta)	8	Matías García	5	0	0	0	0	0	5
4	MF	(Belgium)	47	Mouad El Fanis	3	1	0	0	0	1	5
4	FW	(Italy)	9	Saliou Thioune	2	0	0	1	0	2	5
7	MF	(Malta)	6	Matthew Guillaumier	3	0	0	0	0	0	3
7	FW	(Brazil)	80	Jonny Robert	2	1	0	0	0	0	3
7	MF	(Brazil)	91	Marcelina Emerson	2	0	1	0	0	0	3
7	FW	(Bosnia and Herzegovina)	14	Semir Smajlagić	2	0	0	0	0	1	3
7	FW	(Malta)	7	Shaisen Attard	0	3	0	0	0	0	3
7	FW	(Nigeria)	30	Blessing Eleke	3	0	0	0	0	0	3
13	DF	(Brazil)	2	Rafael Compri	2	0	0	0	0	0	2
13	MF	(Montenegro)	20	Jovan Čađenović	1	1	0	0	0	0	2
13	DF	(Italy)	13	Vincenzo Polito	1	0	0	0	0	1	2
16	FW	(Switzerland)	77	Merlin Hadzi	1	0	0	0	0	0	1
16	MF	(Serbia)	27	Ognjen Bjeličić	1	0	0	0	0	0	1
16	MF	(Italy)	32	Michele Carboni	1	0	0	0	0	0	1
16	DF	(Malta)	94	Ryan Camenzuli	0	1	0	0	0	0	1
16	MF	(Italy)	31	Danilo Bulevardi	0	1	0	0	0	0	1
16	MF	(Croatia)	24	Ante Ćorić	0	0	0	0	0	1	1
16				Own goal	1	0	0	0	0	0	1
				TOTALS	55	11	1	2	2	7	78

=== Clean sheets ===
Place	Position	Nation	Number	Name	Premier League	FA Trophy	Supercup	Champions League	Europa League	Conference League	Total
1	GK	(Malta)	1	Henry Bonello	16	0	0	1	0	1	18
2	GK	(Brazil)	98	Célio	3	2	0	0	0	0	5
				TOTALS	19	2	0	1	0	1	23

=== Disciplinary record ===
Number	Nation	Position	Name	Premier League		FA Trophy		Supercup		Champions League		Europa League		Conference League		Total	
Number	Nation	Position	Name	Yellow card	Red card	Yellow card	Red card	Yellow card	Red card	Yellow card	Red card	Yellow card	Red card	Yellow card	Red card	Yellow card	Red card
1	(Malta)	GK	Henry Bonello	1	0	0	0	0	0	0	0	0	0	2	0	3	0
2	(Brazil)	DF	Rafael Compri	2	0	1	0	0	0	1	0	0	0	0	0	4	0
5	(Malta)	DF	Sven Xerri	4	0	0	0	0	0	0	0	0	0	0	0	4	0
6	(Malta)	MF	Matthew Guillaumier	1	0	0	0	0	0	0	0	0	0	0	0	1	0
7	(Malta)	FW	Shaisen Attard	1	0	0	0	0	0	1	0	0	0	0	0	2	0
8	(Malta)	MF	Matías García	6	0	0	0	1	0	0	0	0	0	2	0	9	0
10	(Malta)	MF	Joseph Mbong	2	0	0	0	0	0	0	0	0	0	2	2	4	2
13	(Italy)	DF	Vincenzo Polito	8	0	1	0	1	0	1	0	1	0	3	1	15	1
17	(France)	MF	Kléri Serber	1	0	0	0	0	0	0	0	0	0	0	0	1	0
25	(Brazil)	MF	Eder	3	1	0	0	0	0	1	0	0	0	3	0	7	1
24	(Colombia)	FW	Damir Ceter	1	0	0	0	0	0	0	0	0	0	0	0	1	0
27	(Serbia)	MF	Ognjen Bjeličić	7	0	1	0	1	1	1	0	1	0	2	0	13	1
30	(Nigeria)	FW	Blessing Eleke	2	0	0	0	0	0	0	0	0	0	0	0	2	0
31	(Italy)	MF	Danilo Bulevardi	4	0	0	0	0	0	0	0	0	0	0	0	4	0
47	(Belgium)	MF	Mouad El Fanis	5	0	0	0	0	0	0	0	1	0	1	0	7	0
80	(Brazil)	FW	Jonny Robert	2	0	0	0	0	0	0	0	0	0	0	0	2	0
91	(Brazil)	MF	Marcelina Emerson	7	2	0	0	0	0	0	0	1	0	2	0	10	2
94	(Malta)	DF	Ryan Camenzuli	5	0	0	0	0	0	1	0	1	0	1	0	8	0
98	(Brazil)	GK	Célio	1	0	0	0	0	0	0	0	0	0	0	0	1	0
Players away on loan:
Players who left Hamrun Spartans during the season:
3	(Malta)	DF	Nikolai Micallef	4	0	0	0	0	0	0	0	0	0	0	0	4	0
9	(Italy)	FW	Saliou Thioune	0	0	0	0	0	0	0	0	0	0	1	0	1	0
14	(Bosnia and Herzegovina)	FW	Semir Smajlagić	0	1	0	0	0	0	0	0	0	0	0	0	0	1
19	(Ivory Coast)	FW	N'dri Koffi	4	0	0	0	0	0	0	0	0	0	2	0	6	0
20	(Montenegro)	MF	Jovan Čađenović	0	0	0	0	0	0	1	0	1	0	1	0	2	0
24	(Croatia)	MF	Ante Ćorić	0	0	0	0	0	0	0	0	0	0	1	0	1	0
33	(Lithuania)	MF	Domantas Šimkus	2	0	0	0	0	0	2	0	0	0	0	0	4	0
77	(Switzerland)	FW	Merlin Hadzi	0	0	0	0	0	0	0	0	0	0	1	0	1	0
			TOTALS	73	3	3	0	3	1	8	0	6	0	24	3	117	7
