= 2025–26 Maltese FA Trophy =

2025-26 Maltese FA Trophy
Tournament details
- Country: Malta
- Dates: 6 December 2025 – 24 May 2026

Final positions
- Champions: Valletta (15th title)
- Runners-up: Gżira United

Tournament statistics
- Matches played: 38
- Goals scored: 136 (3.58 per match)
- All statistics correct as of 4 April 2026.

The 2025–26 Maltese FA Trophy (officially: Meridianbet FA Trophy) is the 88th edition of the football cup competition, the FA Trophy. Valletta FC won 2-1 over Gżira United Fc in the Final making them champions. They have earned a place in the second qualifying round of the 2026–27 UEFA Conference League.

== Preliminary round ==
Seven preliminary round matches were played on 6 and 7 December 2025, featuring the teams from the 2025–26 Maltese Challenge League, 2025–26 Gozo First Division, and the four semi-finalists of the 2025–26 Maltese National Amateur League. However, thirteen teams were awarded a bye to the first round. The draw was held on 26 November 2025 by Malta FA Director of Football Operations Stewart Said and Meridianbet's Operations Manager Byron Falzon.

6 December 2025	Melita (2)	0–1 (a.e.t.)	Xewkija Tigers (Gozo) (1)	Hamrun
14:00 CET			Brenner 119'	Stadium: Victor Tedesco Stadium

6 December 2025	Żebbuġ Rangers (2)	0–5	Qala Saints (Gozo) (1)	Ta' Qali
14:00 CET	Sammut (red card) 74'		Zammit 9'; Mohammed 44', 57', 75'; Inguanez (red card) 73'; Cardona 73'	Stadium: Centenary Stadium

6 December 2025	Sirens (2)	1–2	Santa Lucia (2)	Hamrun
16:30 CET	Schembri 90+3'		Takahara 13'; Cloth 43' (pen.); Azzopardi (yellow card) 53' (yellow-red card) 73'	Stadium: Victor Tedesco Stadium

6 December 2025	St. Andrews (2)	3–0	Vittoriosa Stars (2)	Ta' Qali
16:30 CET	Galliano 16'; Sowah 71'; Nakov 74'			Stadium: Centenary Stadium

7 December 2025	Nadur Youngsters (Gozo) (1)	1–4	Birżebbuġa St. Peter's (2)	Xewkija (Gozo)
14:00 CET	Rodriguez 61'; Gutierrez 73' (o.g.)		Vella 8'; Oliveira 32' (pen.); Agius 71'	Stadium: Gozo Stadium

7 December 2025	Victoria Hotspurs (3)	3–1	Xagħra United (Gozo) (1)	Ta' Qali
16:00 CET	Monteiro 14'; Borg 80'; Alves 90+2' (pen.)		Salis 39'	Stadium: Centenary Stadium

7 December 2025	Qormi (3)	1–4	Balzan (2)	Ta' Qali
18:30 CET	K. Azzopardi 17' (o.g.); A. Azzopardi 52'; Awori (red card) 69'		Engerer 78'; Grech 84'; Silva 90'	Stadium: Centenary Stadium

== Round of 32 ==
Sixteen matches were played between 3 and 4 January, featuring the seven preliminary round winners, the twelve teams from the 2025–26 Maltese Premier League, and the thirteen teams given preliminary round byes.

The draw was held on 26 November 2025 by Malta FA Director of Football Operations Stewart Said and Meridianbet's Operations Manager Byron Falzon.

3 January 2026	Hamrun Spartans (1)	5–0	Victoria Hotspurs (3)	Hamrun
14:00 CET	Attard 5'; Mbong 61'; Camenzuli 63'; Koffi 72'; Čađenović 73'			Stadium: Victor Tedesco Stadium

3 January 2026	Birkirkara (1)	3–1	S.K. Victoria Wanderers (Gozo) (1)	Paola
14:00 CET	Macula 54', 66'; Busuttil 69'		Harland 34'	Stadium: Tony Bezzina Stadium

3 January 2026	Pembroke Athleta (3)	0–1	Valletta (1)	Ta' Qali
14:00 CET	Saldanha (yellow card) 59' (yellow-red card) 90'		Yuri 75' (pen.)	Stadium: Centenary Stadium

3 January 2026	Floriana (1)	1–0	Marsaxlokk (1)	Paola
16:15 CET	López 48'			Stadium: Tony Bezzina Stadium

3 January 2026	Tarxien Rainbows (1)	4–0	Għajnsielem (Gozo) (1)	Hamrun
16:30 CET	Bahia 25'; Nhayson 54'; Murici 62'; Gatt 65'			Stadium: Victor Tedesco Stadium

3 January 2026	Hibernians (1)	3–1	Gudja United (2)	Ta' Qali
16:30 CET	Robozao 8'; Villela 54', 69'		Zivkovic 58'	Stadium: Centenary Stadium

3 January 2026	Sliema Wanderers (1)	1–2 (a.e.t.)	Swieqi United (2)	Ta' Qali
19:00 CET	Baggio (yellow card) 80' (yellow-red card) 98'; Prsa 90+3'; Borg (red card) 105+2'		Davey 82'; Okoh 120+3'	Stadium: Centenary Stadium

3 January 2026	St. Andrews (2)	0–2	Gżira United (1)	Ta' Qali
19:00 CET			Martínez 63'; Costa 71'	Stadium: Centenary Stadium

4 January 2026	Pietà Hotspurs (2)	5–0	Mtarfa (2)	Ta' Qali
11:00 CET	Pisani 6'; Stelmach 44', 90'; Bio 54'; Abo 87'			Stadium: Centenary Stadium

4 January 2026	Żabbar St. Patrick (1)	1–0	Xewkija Tigers (Gozo) (1)	Ta' Qali
13:30 CET	Fontanella 64'		Cassar (yellow card) 16' (yellow-red card) 56'	Stadium: Centenary Stadium

4 January 2026	Marsa (2)	0–3	Naxxar Lions (1)	Hamrun
14:00 CET			Baiano 40'; Vitinho 48', 86'	Stadium: Victor Tedesco Stadium

4 January 2026	Qala Saints (Gozo) (1)	0–2	Mġarr United (2)	Xewkija (Gozo)
14:00 CET			Frendo 37'; Cristhyan 63'	Stadium: Gozo Stadium

4 January 2026	Żurrieq (2)	4–0	Kerċem Ajax (Gozo) (1)	Ta' Qali
16:00 CET	Aquilina 26'; Ihuomah 53'; Eziefula 61'; Monney 80'			Stadium: Centenary Stadium

4 January 2026	Mosta (1)	1–1 (a.e.t.) (4–3 p)	Mqabba (3)	Hamrun
18:30 CET	Halliru 118'		Mijic 119'	Stadium: Victor Tedesco Stadium
	Penalties
	Fernandes (penalty scored); Vassallo (penalty scored); Agius (penalty scored); Emmanuel (penalty scored)		Bugeja (penalty missed); Nanapere (penalty scored); M. Busuttil (penalty scored); Borg (penalty scored); J. Busuttil (penalty missed)

4 January 2026	Balzan (2)	1–1 (a.e.t.) (3–5 p)	Birżebbuġa St. Peter's (2)	Ta' Qali
18:30 CET	Arab (red card) 90+7'; Awosanya 109'		De Souza (red card) 90+17'; Sulaiman 94'	Stadium: Centenary Stadium
	Penalties
	Santos (penalty missed); Awosanya (penalty scored); Ciappara (penalty scored); Engerer (penalty scored)		Lapira (penalty scored); Vella (penalty scored); Zerafa (penalty scored); Grioli (penalty scored); Sulaiman (penalty scored)

4 January 2026	Fgura United (2)	2–1	Santa Lucia (2)	Hamrun
19:00 CET	Marshall 21'; Abdel Rahman 30'; Marshall 80' (o.g.)			Stadium: Victor Tedesco Stadium

== Round of 16 ==
All eight matches were due to be played between 27 and 28 January, featuring the 16 Round of 32 winners. However, the matches Birkirkara v Pietà Hotspurs and Gżira United v Hibernians were postponed. The draw was held on 9 January 2026 by Malta FA Director of Football Operations Stewart Said and former Hibernians and Malta national team player Ernest Spiteri-Gonzi.

27 January 2026	Hamrun Spartans (1)	5–0	Fgura United (2)	Ta' Qali
18:15 CET	Bulevardi 6'; Attard 51', 64'; Robert 78'; Ceter 90+2'		Buhagiar (yellow card) 15' (yellow-red card) 40'	Stadium: Centenary Stadium

27 January 2026	Żurrieq (2)	3–0	Birżebbuġa St. Peter's (2)	Hamrun
20:45 CET	Monney 19', 25' (pen.); Zammit 78'			Stadium: Victor Tedesco Stadium

27 January 2026	Swieqi United (2)	2–4	Naxxar Lions (1)	Ta' Qali
20:45 CET	Mawuena 87'; Okle 89'		Pahama 6'; Baiano 33'; Vitinho 46'; Moura 51' (pen.)	Stadium: Centenary Stadium

28 January 2026	Floriana (1)	0–0 (a.e.t.) (2–4 p)	Żabbar St. Patrick (1)	Paola
18:00 CET				Stadium: Tony Bezzina Stadium
	Penalties
	Grech (penalty scored); Mendonça (penalty missed); Coelho (penalty scored); Linhares (penalty missed)		Fontanella (penalty missed); Agius (penalty scored); Etim (penalty scored); Forte (penalty scored); Micallef (penalty scored)

28 January 2026	Tarxien Rainbows (1)	0–1	Valletta (1)	Ta' Qali
18:15 CET			Yuri 37' (pen.)	Stadium: Centenary Stadium

28 January 2026	Mġarr United (2)	0–3	Mosta (1)	Ta' Qali
20:45 CET			Diamanka 43'; Fernandes 52'; Emmanuel 83'	Stadium: Centenary Stadium

25 February 2026	Gżira United (1)	3–2	Hibernians (1)	Paola
19:00 CET	Xuereb 25' (o.g.); Penha Da Costa 37'; Maia 47'		Silas 48'; Mendonca Padilha 80'	Stadium: Tony Bezzina Stadium; Referee: Fyodor Zammit

25 February 2026	Birkirkara (1)	2–0	Pietà Hotspurs (2)	Ta' Qali
20:15 CET	Coppola 16'; Vrcić 71'			Stadium: Centenary Stadium; Referee: Daniel Casha

== Quarter-finals ==
All eight matches will be played between 3–4 March, featuring the 8 Round of 16 winners. The draw was held on 9 January 2026 by Malta FA Director of Football Operations Stewart Said and former Hibernians and Malta national team player Ernest Spiteri-Gonzi.

4 March 2026	Valletta (1)	3–1 (a.e.t.)	Hamrun Spartans (1)	Ta' Qali
19:00 CET				Stadium: National Stadium

4 March 2026	Birkirkara (1)	2–1	Żabbar St. Patrick (1)	Ta' Qali
		Report		Stadium: Centenary Stadium

3 March 2026	Gżira United (1)	2–1	Mosta (1)	Ta' Qali
		Report		Stadium: Centenary Stadium

4 March 2026	Żurrieq (2)	1–2 (a.e.t.)	Naxxar Lions (1)	Ta' Qali
20:45 CET				Stadium: Centenary Stadium

== Semi-finals ==
Both matches were played on 4 April, featuring the 4 Quarter-final winners. The draw was held on 9 January 2026 by Malta FA Director of Football Operations Stewart Said and former Hibernians and Malta national team player Ernest Spiteri-Gonzi.

4 April 2026	Gżira United (1)	2–1 (a.e.t.)	Naxxar Lions (1)	Ta' Qali
12:45 CET		Report		Stadium: National Stadium

4 April 2026	Valletta (1)	3–1	Birkirkara (1)	Ta' Qali
17:45 CET		Report		Stadium: National Stadium

== Final ==
The final was played on 24 May, featuring the 2 Semi-final winners.

23 May 2026	Valletta	2–1	Gżira United	Ta' Qali
16:00	Jake Azzopardi 64'; Emmanuel Mbende 68'	Report	Andre Costa 34'	Stadium: National Stadium; Referee: Philip Farrugia
