= 2026–27 Hamrun Spartans F.C. season =

Maltese football club season

The 2026–27 season is the 120th season in the history of the Ħamrun Spartans, and their eleventh consecutive in the Maltese Premier League (VBet Premier League for Sponsorship reasons).

== UEFA Conference League 1st Qualifier ==
The Spartans were paired with NSÍ Runavík for the 1st qualifier. They drew the first qualifier 1-1 which was an away day in the Faroe Islands, and were 1-1 in the home leg which was looking like it was headed to penalties until a controversial penalty given to the away side which was scored and made it a 2-1 loss for Ħamrun, 3-2 on aggregate.

== Maltese Premier League ==
The spartans are currently competing in the top division for the 2026–27 season.

=== Round 1 ===
==== Unified ====
They notably beat Valletta 2-1 in the first round phase of the Premier League. A 1-1 draw with Sliema Wanderers gave the spartans a 4th place finish in the unified phase but they only had an 1 point advantage over every Top 6 qualified team below them which were Floriana and Hibernians. The 4th place finish was enough to send them to the top 6.

==== Top 6 ====
Ħamrun qualified for the top 6 due to their position in the unified round. In the first game they drew 2-2 with Marsaxlokk in a thrilling 3 penalty match. The draw with the seaside football club reportedly lead to manager Marco Amelia "physically clashing" with spartan captain Emerson Marcellina which got Amelia sacked from the role later replaced by Portela.
