= Cesar Paiber =

Argentine footballer

Personal information
- Full name: Cesar Oscar Paiber
- Date of birth: February 13, 1970 (age 56)
- Place of birth: Argentina
- Height: 5 ft 10 in (1.78 m)
- Positions: Defender; midfielder

Senior career*
Years	Team	Apps	(Gls)
1988–1989	Tigre		
1990–1991	Gimnasia y Tiro		
1992–1995	Hamrun Spartans	30	(14)
1995–1999	Godoy Cruz		
1999–2001	Independiente		
2001–2002	Hamrun Spartans	38	(8)
2003–2004	Hibernians	38	(6)
2004–2006	Marsaxlokk	34	(3)
- * Club domestic league appearances and goals as of June 12, 2009

Cesar Oscar Paiber (born February 13, 1970) is an Argentine former professional footballer who played for Tigre, Gimnasia y Tiro, Hamrun Spartans, Godoy Cruz, Independiente, Hibernians and Marsaxlokk, during his career he played often as a defender and sometimes as a midfielder.

== Personal life ==
Paiber's son, Brandon Paiber is also a professional footballer, and represents the Malta national football team.
