= 2025–26 Maltese Premier League =

Maltese Premier League
- Season: 2025–26
- Dates: 16 August 2025 – 16 May 2026
- Champions: Floriana
- Relegated: Naxxar Lions; Tarxien Rainbows
- UEFA Champions League: Floriana
- UEFA Conference League: Valletta; Marsaxlokk; Ħamrun Spartans
- Matches: 192
- Goals: 483 (2.52 per match)
- Top goalscorer: Yuri; Joseph Mbong (12 goals each)
- Biggest home win: Birkirkara 5-0 Tarxien Rainbows (3 February 2026), Naxxar Lions 5-0 Mosta (4 February 2026)
- Biggest away win: Birkirkara 1-6 Hamrun Spartans (21 December 2025)
- Highest scoring: Hibernians 5–3 Gzira United (18 August 2025)
- Longest winning run: Floriana (5 games)
- Longest unbeaten run: Floriana (11 games)
- Longest winless run: Naxxar Lions and Mosta (both 10 games)
- Longest losing run: Mosta (5 games)

The 2025–26 Maltese Premier League (referred to as the YoHealth Malta Premier for sponsorship reasons) was the 111th season of top-flight league football in Malta. The season began on 16 August 2025 and concluded with the final of the final four on 16 May 2026. Ħamrun Spartans entered the season as defending champions having won their eleventh Premier League title in the previous season, their third consecutive one.

== Teams ==
Twelve teams are competing in the league: the top ten teams from the previous season and two teams promoted from the Challenge League.

=== Changes from the previous season ===
Promoted to the Premier League

- Valletta
- Tarxien Rainbows

Relegated to the Challenge League

- Melita
- Balzan

=== Locations ===
Location of teams in the 2025–26 Maltese Premier League

Team	In league since	City
Birkirkara	1990	Birkirkara
Floriana	1986	Floriana
Gżira United	2016	Gżira
Ħamrun Spartans	2016	Ħamrun
Hibernians	1945	Paola
Marsaxlokk	2022	Marsaxlokk
Mosta	2011	Mosta
Naxxar Lions	2023	Naxxar
Sliema Wanderers	2023	Sliema
Tarxien Rainbows	2025	Tarxien
Valletta	2025	Valletta
Żabbar St. Patrick	2024	Żabbar

=== Personnel and kits ===
Team	Manager	Kit manufacturer	Shirt sponsor (front)	Shirt sponsor (back)	Shirt sponsor (sleeve)
Birkirkara	(Italy) Gianluca Festa	(United States) Nike	McDonald's	Inter Sport (bottom)	
Floriana	(Portugal) Daniel Portela	(Italy) Errea	Boggi		Go & Fun (right)
Gżira United	(Malta) Darren Abdilla	(Italy) Errea			Miracles Food (left)
Ħamrun Spartans	(Italy) Giacomo Modica	(Germany) Puma	JP (home kit); Mercury (away kit)	Meridianbet; Besteam Audio; Visit Malta (bottom)	Ta' Fonzu (right); Tescoma (left)
Hibernians	(Serbia) Branko Nišević	(Spain) Joma	Bezzina		
Marsaxlokk	(Italy) Enzo Potenza	(Italy) Errea	1padel		Mr. Fitz Restaurant Marsaxlokk (left)
Mosta	(Malta) Joseph Grech	(Italy) Macron	Simply Clean	Highbet (top); Teamsport (bottom)	
Naxxar Lions	(Malta) Winston Muscat	(Spain) Joma	VC Service Station	Zarb Coaches; Haier Air Conditioner (top); McQueen; Sammut Concrete Supplies (bottom)	Fastdrop (right); Hi Koki; Würth; Falcotra (left)
Sliema Wanderers	(Argentina) Pablo Doffo	(Germany) Adidas	NMGroup; Inter Wetter	Visit Malta (top); Thomas Smith; Zarb Coaches (bottom)	Fonicom (left); Domnic Sciberras Roof Repair (right)
Tarxien Rainbows	(Malta) Jacques Scerri	(Italy) Errea	Cassar		
Valletta	(Malta) Thane Micallef	(United States) Nike	Iniala	Intersport	
Żabbar St. Patrick	(Italy) Aniello Parisi	(Germany) Adidas	The Shoreline		

- Additionally, referee kits are made by Macron

=== Managerial changes ===
Team	Outgoing manager	Manner of departure	Date of vacancy	Position in the table	Incoming manager	Date of appointment
Birkirkara	(Italy) Stefano De Angelis	Sacked	29 August 2025	8th	(Italy) Gianluca Festa	14 September 2025
Gżira United	(Malta) Clive Mizzi	Resigned	28 September 2025	12th	(Malta) Darren Abdilla	29 September 2025
Naxxar Lions	(Malta) George Vella	Resigned	14 December 2025	12th	(Malta) Winston Muscat	15 December 2025
Sliema Wanderers	(Malta) Paul Zammit	Mutual Consent	5 January 2026	3rd	(Argentina) Pablo Doffo	7 January 2026

== Venues ==
The matches will be played mainly at the Ta' Qali National Stadium and the Tony Bezzina Stadium. However, the Centenary Stadium, the Gozo Stadium and the Victor Tedesco Stadium will be used for other matches.

Ta' Qali		2025–26 Maltese Premier League is located in Malta
Ta' Qali National Stadium	Centenary Stadium	2025–26 Maltese Premier League is located in Malta
Capacity: 16,997	Capacity: 3,000	2025–26 Maltese Premier League is located in Malta
Paola	Ħamrun	Xewkija
Tony Bezzina Stadium	Victor Tedesco Stadium	Gozo Stadium
Capacity: 2,968	Capacity: 1,962	Capacity: 1,644

== Format ==
The new league format, which came into being from the 2024–25 season, the Maltese Premier League will be made up of 12 teams and be split into an Opening Round and Closing Round. The Opening Round will see each of the 12 teams play each other once before the league is then split between a Top 6 and a Bottom 6, allowing for the teams in each of those splits to play each other another time. Once the ranking is set, each team will go back down to 0 points and start from scratch in the Closing Round, where the same process will be repeated.

The league champions and the teams for UEFA competitions are determined as follow:

- If both the Opening Round and the Closing Round are won by the same team:
  - The winners of the Opening and the Closing Rounds are declared the league champions and qualify for the UEFA Champions League;
  - Second placed teams in the Opening Round and the Closing Round qualify for the UEFA Conference League;
  - If the same team finishes second in both the Opening and the Closing Rounds, a playoff match between third placed teams in the Opening Round and the Closing Round is played for the remaining spot in the UEFA Conference League;
- If the champions of the Opening Round are placed second in the Closing Round, and the champions of the Closing Round are placed second in the Opening Round:
  - A playoff match between the champions of the Opening and the Closing Round is played to determine the league champions;
  - A playoff match between third placed teams in the Opening Round and the Closing Round is played for the remaining spot in the UEFA Conference League;
- Otherwise, a Final Four tournament between winners and runners-up of the Opening and the Closing Rounds is played (if the same team finishes second in both the Opening and the Closing Rounds, the third placed team with the best aggregate points is included in the Final Four tournament), with the teams seeded based on the aggregate points.

== Opening round ==
=== First phase ===
==== League table ====
Pos	Team	Pld	W	D	L	GF	GA	GD	Pts	Qualification
1	Floriana	11	7	2	2	17	11	+6	23	Qualification for the Top Six
2	Ħamrun Spartans	11	6	4	1	15	6	+9	22 (Note: Head-to-head points: Ħamrun Spartans 1; Valletta 1. Head-to-head goals scored: Ħamrun Spartans 1; Valletta 1.)	Qualification for the Top Six
3	Valletta	11	6	4	1	16	8	+8	22	Qualification for the Top Six
4	Sliema Wanderers	11	5	4	2	16	14	+2	19	Qualification for the Top Six
5	Marsaxlokk	11	5	3	3	14	11	+3	18	Qualification for the Top Six
6	Birkirkara	11	4	4	3	12	8	+4	16	Qualification for the Top Six
7	Hibernians	11	4	3	4	20	18	+2	15	Qualification for the Play-Out
8	Gżira United	11	3	4	4	14	18	−4	13	Qualification for the Play-Out
9	Mosta	11	3	2	6	13	19	−6	11	Qualification for the Play-Out
10	Żabbar St. Patrick	11	2	4	5	11	14	−3	10	Qualification for the Play-Out
11	Tarxien Rainbows	11	1	2	8	8	21	−13	5 (Note: Head-to-head points: Tarxien Rainbows 3; Naxxar Lions 0.)	Qualification for the Play-Out
12	Naxxar Lions	11	1	2	8	10	18	−8	5	Qualification for the Play-Out

Source: Malta Football Association
Rules for classification: 1) Points; 2) Head-to-head points; 3) Head-to-head goal difference; 4) Head-to-head goals scored; 5) Goal difference; 6) Goals scored; 7) Play-offs (only if needed to decide champions, teams for relegation or teams for UEFA competitions).

==== Results ====
Home \ Away	BIR	FLO	GŻI	ĦAM	HIB	MAR	MOS	NXR	SLI	TAR	VAL	ZAB
Birkirkara	—	—	0–0	0–2	—	—	2–0	1–0	—	—	—	—
Floriana	2–0	—	1–1	1–3	—	—	—	—	2–2	—	0–2	3–1
Gżira United	—	—	—	—	—	—	—	2–1	—	3–1	—	—
Ħamrun Spartans	—	—	0–0	—	2–0	—	2–0	—	—	—	1–1	—
Hibernians	2–1	0–1	5–3	—	—	2–2	—	2–0	2–3	—	—	—
Marsaxlokk	0–0	1–2	2–0	0–2	—	—	3–1	—	—	—	—	1–0
Mosta	—	0–1	3–4	—	2–2	—	—	3–0	—	—	—	1–1
Naxxar Lions	—	1–3	—	1–1	—	0–1	—	—	—	2–3	0–1	—
Sliema Wanderers	2–2	—	2–0	2–0	—	1–1	0–1	0–4	—	1–0	1–1	—
Tarxien Rainbows	0–4	0–1	—	1–1	1–3	0–2	0–1	—	—	—	1–2	1–1
Valletta	0–0	—	1–1	—	1–0	3–1	4–1	—	—	—	—	0–2
Żabbar St. Patrick	0–2	—	2–0	0–1	2–2	—	—	1–1	1–2	—	—	—

Source: Malta Football Association
Legend: Blue = home team win; Yellow = draw; Red = away team win.

=== Second phase ===
==== Top Six ====
Pos	Team	Pld	W	D	L	GF	GA	GD	Pts	Qualification	ĦAM	FLO	VAL	SLI	MAR	BIR
1	Ħamrun Spartans (W)	16	10	4	2	26	10	+16	34	Opening Round Winners	—	—	1–0	1–0	1–3	6–1
2	Floriana	16	10	3	3	23	15	+8	33		0–2	—	0–0	2–1	2–1	2–0
3	Valletta	16	8	5	3	20	11	+9	29		—	—	—	1–2	1–0	2–0
4	Sliema Wanderers	16	7	5	4	21	19	+2	26		—	—	—	—	0–0	2–1
5	Marsaxlokk	16	7	4	5	20	16	+4	25		—	—	—	—	—	2–1
6	Birkirkara	16	4	4	8	15	22	−7	16		—	—	—	—	—	—

Source: Malta Football Association
Legend: Blue = home team win; Yellow = draw; Red = away team win.
Rules for classification: 1) Points; 2) Head-to-head points; 3) Head-to-head goal difference; 4) Head-to-head goals scored; 5) Goal difference; 6) Goals scored; 7) Play-offs (only if needed to decide champions, teams for relegation or teams for UEFA competitions).
(W) Opening Round Winners

==== Play-Out ====
Pos	Team	Pld	W	D	L	GF	GA	GD	Pts	Relegation	HIB	GŻI	ZAB	MOS	NXR	TAR
7	Hibernians	16	6	5	5	29	25	+4	23		—	4–1	3–3	0–2	1–1	1–0
8	Gżira United	16	6	4	6	21	26	−5	22		—	—	0–2	1–0	3–1	2–1
9	Żabbar St. Patrick	16	3	7	6	20	22	−2	16 (Note: Head-to-head points: Żabbar St. Patrick 2; Mosta 2. Head-to-head goals: Żabbar St. Patrick 2; Mosta 2.)		—	—	—	—	1–2	2–2
10	Mosta	16	4	4	8	20	26	−6	16		—	—	1–1	—	2–3	2–2
11	Naxxar Lions	16	4	3	9	18	25	−7	15	Opening Round Relegation	—	—	—	—	—	1–0
12	Tarxien Rainbows	16	1	4	11	13	29	−16	7	Opening Round Relegation	—	—	—	—	—	—

Source: Malta Football Association
Legend: Blue = home team win; Yellow = draw; Red = away team win.
Rules for classification: 1) Points; 2) Head-to-head points; 3) Head-to-head goal difference; 4) Head-to-head goals scored; 5) Goal difference; 6) Goals scored; 7) Play-offs (only if needed to decide champions, teams for relegation or teams for UEFA competitions).

== Closing round ==
=== First phase ===
==== League table ====
Pos	Team	Pld	W	D	L	GF	GA	GD	Pts	Qualification
1	Floriana	11	7	4	0	20	7	+13	25	Qualification for the Top Six
2	Ħamrun Spartans	11	6	4	1	16	4	+12	22	Qualification for the Top Six
3	Marsaxlokk	11	5	4	2	12	12	0	19	Qualification for the Top Six
4	Naxxar Lions	11	5	3	3	20	18	+2	18	Qualification for the Top Six
5	Valletta	11	4	5	2	16	7	+9	17 (Note: Head-to-head points: Valletta 3; Gżira United 0.)	Qualification for the Top Six
6	Gżira United	11	5	2	4	14	12	+2	17	Qualification for the Top Six
7	Sliema Wanderers	11	4	4	3	10	11	−1	16	Qualification for the Play-Out
8	Birkirkara	11	3	4	4	12	12	0	13	Qualification for the Play-Out
9	Hibernians	11	3	2	6	11	17	−6	11	Qualification for the Play-Out
10	Żabbar St. Patrick	11	2	4	5	13	15	−2	10	Qualification for the Play-Out
11	Tarxien Rainbows	11	1	3	7	9	21	−12	6	Qualification for the Play-Out
12	Mosta	11	1	1	9	7	24	−17	4	Qualification for the Play-Out

Source: Malta Football Association
Rules for classification: 1) Points; 2) Head-to-head points; 3) Head-to-head goal difference; 4) Head-to-head goals scored; 5) Goal difference; 6) Goals scored; 7) Play-offs (only if needed to decide champions, teams for relegation or teams for UEFA competitions).

==== Results ====
Home \ Away	BIR	FLO	GŻI	ĦAM	HIB	MAR	MOS	NXR	SLI	TAR	VAL	ZAB
Birkirkara	—	2–2	—	—	3–0	0–1	—	—	1–1	5–0	1–0	0–3
Floriana	—	—	—	—	4–1	0–0	2–1	3–1	—	2–0	—	—
Gżira United	2–0	1–2	—	0–0	1–0	3–0	1–0	—	—	—	0–2	1–1
Ħamrun Spartans	3–0	1–1	—	—	—	2–0	—	4–0	2–0	2–1	—	0–0
Hibernians	—	—	—	0–1	—	—	1–0	—	—	1–1	1–1	2–1
Marsaxlokk	—	—	—	—	2–1	—	—	1–1	1–1	2–1	1–1	—
Mosta	0–0	—	—	2–1	—	1–2	—	—	0–1	0–1	0–5	—
Naxxar Lions	0–0	—	4–2	—	2–1	—	5–0	—	1–1	—	—	2–1
Sliema Wanderers	—	0–1	2–1	—	1–3	—	—	—	—	—	—	1–0
Tarxien Rainbows	—	—	1–2	—	—	—	—	1–2	1–1	—	—	1–1
Valletta	—	0–0	—	0–0	—	—	—	4–2	0–1	3–1	—	—
Żabbar St. Patrick	—	0–3	—	—	—	1–2	5–3	—	—	—	0–0	—

Source: Malta Football Association
Legend: Blue = home team win; Yellow = draw; Red = away team win.

=== Second phase ===
==== Top Six ====
Pos	Team	Pld	W	D	L	GF	GA	GD	Pts		FLO	MAR	ĦAM	VAL	GŻI	NXR
1	Floriana (W)	16	11	4	1	28	12	+16	37	Closing Round Winners	—	—	1–4	2–0	—	—
2	Marsaxlokk	16	9	4	3	22	20	+2	31		1–3	—	3–2	1–0	2–1	3–2
3	Ħamrun Spartans	16	8	4	4	26	11	+15	28		—	—	—	—	0–1	3–0
4	Valletta	16	6	6	4	21	13	+8	24		—	—	2–1	—	2–1	—
5	Gżira United	16	6	3	7	17	17	0	21		0–1	—	—	—	—	0–0
6	Naxxar Lions	16	5	5	6	23	26	−3	20		0–1	—	—	1–1	—	—

Source: Malta Football Association
Legend: Blue = home team win; Yellow = draw; Red = away team win.
Rules for classification: 1) Points; 2) Points in regular season; 3) Head-to-head points in regular season; 4) Head-to-head goal difference in regular season; 5) Head-to-head goals scored in regular season; 6) Head-to-head away goals scored in regular season (if two teams tied); 7) Goal difference; 8) Goals scored; 9) Fair play ranking; 10) Drawing of lots.
(W) Closing Round Winners

==== Play-Out ====
Pos	Team	Pld	W	D	L	GF	GA	GD	Pts	Relegation	SLI	BIR	HIB	TAR	ZAB	MOS
7	Sliema Wanderers	16	5	7	4	16	17	−1	22		—	1–0	1–1			
8	Birkirkara	16	4	7	5	14	14	0	19			—			1–0	1–1
9	Hibernians	16	4	4	8	16	24	−8	16			0–0	—			2–0
10	Tarxien Rainbows	16	3	6	7	19	29	−10	15 (Note: Head-to-head points: Żabbar St. Patrick 2; Tarxien Rainbows 2. Head-to-head goals: Żabbar St. Patrick 4; Tarxien Rainbows 4. Tarxien Rainbows won play-off.)		2–1	0–0	3–2	—	3–3	2–2
11	Żabbar St. Patrick	16	3	6	7	21	22	−1	15	Closing Round Relegation	1–1		3–0		—	
12	Mosta	16	2	4	10	14	32	−18	10	Closing Round Relegation	2–2				2–1	—

Source: Malta Football Association
Legend: Blue = home team win; Yellow = draw; Red = away team win.
Rules for classification: 1) Points; 2) Head-to-head points; 3) Head-to-head goal difference; 4) Head-to-head goals scored; 5) Goal difference; 6) Goals scored; 7) Play-offs (only if needed to decide champions, teams for relegation or teams for UEFA competitions).

==== Play-off 11th place ====
5 May 2026
19:00

Żabbar St. Patrick	2–3 (a.e.t.)	Tarxien Rainbows
Strahinja Jovančić 90+6'; Pedro Cejas 94'	Report	Petar Panić 66'; Ángel Valverde 104'; Nhayson 118'

Ta' Qali National Stadium, Ta' Qali
Attendance: 635
Referee: Ishmael Barbara

== Aggregate table ==
=== League table ===
Pos	Team	Pld	W	D	L	GF	GA	GD	Pts	
1	Floriana (C)	32	21	7	4	51	27	+24	70	Qualification for the Final Four
2	Ħamrun Spartans	32	18	8	6	52	21	+31	62	Qualification for the Final Four
3	Marsaxlokk	32	16	8	8	42	36	+6	56	Qualification for the Final Four
4	Valletta	32	14	11	7	41	24	+17	53	Qualification for the Final Four and Conference League second qualifying round (Note: Valletta qualified as 2025–26 Maltese FA Trophy winners.)
5	Sliema Wanderers	32	12	12	8	37	36	+1	48	
6	Gżira United	32	12	7	13	38	43	−5	43	
7	Hibernians	32	10	9	13	45	49	−4	39	
8	Birkirkara	32	8	11	13	29	36	−7	35 (Note: Head-to-head points: Birkirkara 4, Naxxar Lions 1.)	
9	Naxxar Lions (R)	32	9	8	15	41	51	−10	35	Qualification for the Relegation play-off
10	Żabbar St. Patrick (O)	32	6	13	13	41	44	−3	31	Qualification for the Relegation play-off
11	Mosta (O)	32	6	8	18	34	58	−24	26	Qualification for the Relegation play-off
12	Tarxien Rainbows (R)	32	4	10	18	32	58	−26	22	Qualification for the Relegation play-off

Source: Malta Football Association
Rules for classification: 1) Points; 2) Head-to-head points; 3) Head-to-head goal difference; 4) Head-to-head goals scored; 5) Goal difference; 6) Goals scored; 7) Play-offs (only if needed to decide champions, teams for relegation or teams for UEFA competitions).
(C) Champions; (O) Play-off relegation winner; (R) Relegated

== Final Four Championship ==
Since the Opening Round Top 2 and the Closing Round Top 2 are three different teams, there would be a Final Four play-off between the top two teams from the Opening Round, Ħamrun Spartans and Floriana, and the Closing Round, Floriana and Marsaxlokk. Since Floriana finish in top 2 in both rounds, the best third team would qualify too, Valletta.

=== Bracket ===
Semi-finals
9 May
Valletta	0 (1)
Floriana	0 (3)
9 May
Marsaxlokk	2
Ħamrun Spartans	1

Final
16 May
Floriana	2
Marsaxlokk	1
Third place play-off
15 May
Valletta	0
Ħamrun Spartans	2

=== Semi-finals ===
9 May 2026
14:45

Valletta	0–0 (a.e.t.)	Floriana
	Report
Penalties
	1–3

Ta' Qali National Stadium, Ta' Qali
Referee: Slobodan Petrović

9 May 2026
19:30

Marsaxlokk	2–1 (a.e.t.)	Ħamrun Spartans
Minala 38' (pen.), 98'	Report	García 89'

Ta' Qali National Stadium, Ta' Qali
Referee: Glenn Tonna

=== Third place play-off ===
15 May 2026
19:00

Valletta	0–2	Ħamrun Spartans
	Report	Mbong 1'; Ceter 7'

Ta' Qali National Stadium, Ta' Qali
Referee: Alex Johnson

=== Final ===
16 May 2026
16:00

Floriana	2–1	Marsaxlokk
Federico Varela 56'; Kenan Dervišagić 90+3'	Report	Rasmus Lindén 36'

Ta' Qali National Stadium, Ta' Qali
Referee: Matthew De Gabriele

== Relegation play-off ==
Since the Opening Round bottom two, Naxxar Lions and Tarxien Rainbows, and the Closing Round bottom two, Żabbar St. Patrick and Mosta, are four different teams there would be four teams participating in the relegation play-off.

10 May 2026
11:00

Mosta	1–0	Naxxar Lions
Azer Kozić 22'

Ta' Qali National Stadium, Ta' Qali
Referee: Fyodor Zammit

10 May 2026
11:00

Tarxien Rainbows	0–2 (a.e.t.)	Żabbar St. Patrick
		Majok 108'; Fontanella 117' (pen.)

Tony Bezzina Stadium, Paola
Referee: Daniel Portelli

== Season statistics ==
=== Scoring ===
==== Top scorers ====
As of 17 August 2026

Rank	Player	Club	Goals
1	(Malta) Joseph Mbong	Hamrun	14
2	(Brazil) Yuri	Valletta	12
2	(Nigeria) Prince Emmanuel	Gżira United	12
2	(Cape Verde) Dodo	Marsaxlokk	12
2	(Brazil) Vitinho	Naxxar	12
6	(Malta) Jake Grech	Floriana	11
6	(Brazil) Lucas Villela	Hibernians	11
8	(Italy) Mario Fontanella	Zabbar	9

==== Hat-Ricks ====
Rank	Player	Club	Played Against
1	Asumah Abukabar	Birkirkara	vs Tarxien Ranbows
2	Andrea Zammit	Valletta	vs Mosta

=== Discipline ===
Hibernians has been the most disciplined in the league, with only 55 yellow cards, compared to Birkirkara, who have 56 yellow cards.

Rank	Team	Red Cards	Players
1	Birkirkara	6	Donovan Mankoma (vs Gżira United, 23 August 2025), Kurt Zammit (vs Sliema Wanderers, 16 September 2025), Kurt Zammit (vs Hamrun Spartans, 1 November 2025), Miguel Ángel Martínez (vs Sliema Wanderers, 23 November 2025)
2	Floriana	4	Zachary Scerri (vs Tarxien, 23 August 2025), Charles M'Mombwa (vs Valletta, 16 September 2025 and vs Valletta, 10 January 2026), Matteja Veselji (vs Valletta, 16 September 2025)
2	Gżira United	4	Clayton Failla (vs Naxxar Lions, 3 November 2025), David Xuereb (vs Naxxar Lions, 3 November 2025), Mihajlo Stojanović (vs Tarxien Ranbows, 31 January 2026), Kante (vs Tarxien Ranbows, 31 January 2026)
2	Sliema Wanderers	4	Rashed Al-Tumi (vs Naxxar Lions, 28 September 2025), Murilo Henrique (vs Valletta, 14 December 2025), Gustavo Alcino (vs Floriana, 20 December 2025), Dejan Đurić (vs Hibernians, 15 January 2026), Francisco Lopez (vs Gżira United, 25 January 2026)
3	Hamrun Spartans	3	Semir Smajlagič (vs Sliema Wanderers, 5 October 2025), Edeson (vs Floriana, 29 October 2025)
3	Valletta	3	Jefferson De Assis (vs Sliema Wanderers, 14 December 2025), Sava Radić (vs Marsaxlokk, 20 December 2025), Diego Taraves (vs Floriana, 10 January 2026)
3	Zabbar St Patrick's	3	Youngwon Im (vs Hibernians, 24 August 2025), Brian Gambarte (vs Tarxien Rainbows, 24 November 2025), Mayron Marques (vs Hibernians, 18 December 2025)
3	Mosta	3	Giancarlo (vs Marsaxlokk, 17 August 2025), Chunkwuemeka Eka (vs Sliema Wanderers, 22 August 2025), Quelmer Hurtado (vs Birkirkara, 21 September 2025)

== See also ==
- 2025–26 Maltese Challenge League
- 2025–26 Maltese National Amateur League
- 2025–26 Maltese National Amateur League II
- 2025–26 Maltese FA Trophy
