= N'dri Philippe Koffi =

Ivorian footballer (born 2002)

Personal information
- Date of birth: 9 March 2002 (age 24)
- Place of birth: Abidjan, Ivory Coast
- Height: 1.83 m (6 ft 0 in)
- Position: Winger

Team information
- Current team: Catanzaro
- Number: 39

Youth career
- 2009–2011: JS Coulaines
- 2011–2018: Le Mans
- 2018–2019: Laval
- 2019–2020: Reims

Senior career*
Years	Team	Apps	(Gls)
2020–2022	Reims II	17	(5)
2021–2023	Reims	10	(1)
2022	→ Paços de Ferreira (loan)	3	(0)
2022–2023	→ Paços de Ferreira (loan)	12	(2)
2023	→ Le Mans (loan)	16	(3)
2023–2025	Sochaux	19	(2)
2025–2026	Ħamrun Spartans	37	(6)
2026–	Catanzaro	10	(1)

International career^{‡}
2023	Ivory Coast U23	4	(2)
- * Club domestic league appearances and goals as of 10 May 2026 ‡ National team caps and goals as of 00:49, 8 June 2023 (UTC)

N'dri Philippe Koffi (born 9 March 2002) is an Ivorian professional footballer who plays as a winger for Serie B club Catanzaro.

== Club career ==
Koffi began playing football at the youth academy of Coulaines, and had stint with the youth teams at Le Mans and Laval before joining Reims on 9 July 2019. He made his professional debut with Reims in a 2–0 Ligue 1 win over Rennes on 12 September 2021, scoring his side's second goal in the 67th minute.

On 28 January 2022, Koffi was loaned to Paços de Ferreira in Portugal. On 11 August 2022, he returned to Paços de Ferreira on a new loan.

On 31 January 2023, Koffi moved on a new loan to Le Mans in Championnat National.

On 21 August 2023, Koffi signed for recently relegated Championnat National club Sochaux on a two-year deal.

On 2 February 2026, Koffi joined Catanzaro in Serie B on a one-and-a-half-year contract for a transfer fee believed to be €85,000.

== International career ==
Koffi was called up to the Ivory Coast U23 team for the 2023 Maurice Revello Tournament.

== Career statistics ==
As of match played 21 December 2025

Appearances and goals by club, season and competition
Club	Season	League			National cup (Note: Includes Coupe de France, Maltese FA Trophy)		Europe		Other		Total	
Club	Season	Division	Apps	Goals	Apps	Goals	Apps	Goals	Apps	Goals	Apps	Goals
Sochaux	2023–24	Championnat National	18	2	3	0	–		–		21	2
Sochaux	2024–25	Championnat National	1	0	0	0	–		–		1	0
Sochaux	Total		19	2	3	0	–		–		22	2
Ħamrun Spartans	2025–26	Maltese Premier League	12	4	0	0	14 (Note: Four appearances in UEFA Champions League, two appearances and one goal in UEFA Europa League, eight appearances and one goal in UEFA Conference League)	2	0	0	26	6
Career total			31	6	3	0	14	2	0	0	49	8
