= Malta national under-21 football team =

National U-21 association football team

Malta Under 21
- Nickname: Knights of St John
- Association: Malta Football Association
- Head coach: Gilbert Agius
- Captain: Jake Micallef
First colours	Second colours

First international
- Libya 1–0 Malta; 22 September 1977

Biggest win
- Malta 5–1 Macedonia (North Macedonia); 17 November 1998

Biggest defeat
- Italy 8–0 Malta; 21 December 1988

The Malta national under-21 football team is the national under-21 association football team of Malta and is controlled by the Malta Football Association.

The team is sponsored by Adidas.

== Competitive record ==
=== UEFA European Under-21 Championship ===
UEFA U-21 Championship record									UEFA U-21 Championship qualification record						
Year	Round	Pld	W	D	L	GF	GA	GD	Pld	W	D	L	GF	GA	GD
(European Union) 1992	did not qualify								6	0	0	6	5	22	−17
(France) 1994	did not qualify								8	0	0	8	1	25	−24
(Spain) 1996	did not qualify								10	1	2	7	4	25	−21
(Romania) 1998	did not qualify								8	0	0	8	0	29	−29
(Slovakia) 2000	did not qualify								8	1	0	7	8	23	−15
(Switzerland) 2002	did not qualify								10	0	4	6	5	20	−15
(Germany) 2004	did not qualify								8	0	1	7	0	13	−13
(Portugal) 2006	did not qualify								10	1	2	7	3	16	−13
(Netherlands) 2007	did not qualify								2	0	0	2	2	4	−2
(Sweden) 2009	did not qualify								8	1	0	7	3	24	−21
(Denmark) 2011	did not qualify								8	0	0	8	0	13	−13
(Israel) 2013	did not qualify								10	1	2	7	8	23	−15
(Czech Republic) 2015	did not qualify								8	0	0	8	2	30	−28
(Poland) 2017	did not qualify								10	3	2	5	9	20	−11
(Italy) 2019	did not qualify								10	1	1	8	8	24	−16
Total	0/16								124	9	14	101	58	311	−253

== Players ==
=== Current squad ===
The following players were called up for the November 2026 training camp including friendlies against Palermo Primavera.

Caps and goals correct as of 31 March 2026, after the match against Georgia.

No.	Pos.	Player	Date of birth (age)	Caps	Goals	Club
1	GK	Carlos Camilleri	10 November 2007 (age 19)	0	0	(Malta Football Association) Mgarr United
12	GK	Fabian Lauri	6 June 2006 (age 20)	0	0	(Malta Football Association) Sliema Wanderers
23	GK	Liam Frendo	16 March 2006 (age 20)	2	0	(Malta Football Association) Valletta
23	GK	Jake Scicluna	24 April 2006 (age 20)	0	0	(Malta Football Association) Sirens
3	DF	Matthias Ellul	3 December 2004 (age 21)	11	1	(Malta Football Association) Valletta
4	DF	Jake Vassallo	21 June 2004 (age 22)	13	0	(Malta Football Association) Mosta
5	DF	Sven Xerri	10 February 2005 (age 21)	12	0	(Malta Football Association) Hamrun Spartans
13	DF	Deacon Abela	23 September 2004 (age 22)	2	0	(Malta Football Association) Gżira United
14	DF	Tristan Viviani	17 February 2004 (age 22)	2	0	(United States Soccer Federation) San Diego State Aztecs
16	DF	Jake Micallef	12 January 2004 (age 22)	21	0	(Malta Football Association) Żabbar St. Patrick
19	DF	Nikita Shchepetkin	1 September 2006 (age 20)	1	0	(Italian Football Federation) Livorno
2	MF	Kean Scicluna	12 September 2006 (age 20)	8	1	(Malta Football Association) Żabbar St. Patrick
6	MF	Andy Borg	27 May 2004 (age 22)	20	0	(Malta Football Association) Gżira United
8	MF	Lucas Caruana	24 September 2005 (age 21)	5	0	(Malta Football Association) Hibernians
10	MF	Jake Grech	6 March 2004 (age 22)	9	0	(Malta Football Association) Balzan
15	MF	Kaiden Fenech	17 November 2005 (age 21)	2	0	(Malta Football Association) Birkirkara
17	MF	Shaisen Attard	29 October 2004 (age 22)	8	0	(Malta Football Association) Hamrun Spartans
18	MF	Daniel Letherby	21 August 2004 (age 22)	11	0	(Malta Football Association) Naxxar Lions
7	FW	Brooklyn Borg	8 January 2004 (age 22)	5	0	(Malta Football Association) Gżira United
9	FW	Nicholas Agius	22 June 2006 (age 20)	8	1	(Malta Football Association) Żabbar St. Patrick
11	FW	Nathan Cross	1 September 2004 (age 22)	9	0	(Malta Football Association) Birkirkara
20	FW	Josh Pitts	13 February 2007 (age 19)	7	0	(The Football Association) Ipswich Town
21	FW	Sean Gatt	25 August 2005 (age 21)	6	0	(Malta Football Association) St. Lucia
22	FW	Kai Bartolo	16 July 2007 (age 19)	3	0	(The Football Association) Wealdstone
	FW	Gabriel Vella	2 December 2005 (age 20)	1	0	(Malta Football Association) Kerċem Ajax

=== Recent call-ups ===
The following players have been called up within the last 12 months.

Pos.	Player	Date of birth (age)	Caps	Goals	Club	Latest call-up
