= Brandon Paiber =

Maltese footballer (born 1995)

Personal information
- Full name: Brandon Diego Paiber
- Date of birth: 5 June 1995 (age 31)
- Place of birth: Pilar, Argentina
- Height: 1.78 m (5 ft 10 in)
- Position: Midfielder

Team information
- Current team: Valletta
- Number: 10

Youth career
- 2010–2013: Comunicaciones

Senior career*
Years	Team	Apps	(Gls)
2013–2015	Fénix	3	(0)
2015–2017	Social Obrero		
2017	Hamrun Spartans	10	(2)
2017–2018	Comunicaciones	7	(1)
2018–2019	St. Lucia	12	(3)
2019	→ Floriana (loan)	12	(2)
2019–2022	Floriana	61	(7)
2022–	Valletta	101	(15)

International career^{‡}
2019–	Malta	21	(0)
- * Club domestic league appearances and goals as of 7 May 2026 ‡ National team caps and goals as of 21:26, 16 November 2026 (UTC)

Brandon Diego Paiber (born 5 June 1995) is a professional footballer who plays as a midfielder for Valletta. Born in Argentina, he plays for the Malta national team.

== Club career ==
Paiber joined Floriana in January 2019 on loan from St. Lucia, before joining on a permanent basis for the 2019–20 season.

== International career ==
Paiber made his international debut for Malta on 15 November 2019 in a UEFA Euro 2020 qualifying match against Spain, which finished as a 0–7 away loss.

== Personal life ==
Paiber was born in Argentina, and is the son of the former professional footballer Cesar Paiber. Paiber spent his youth in Malta when his father played there, and has a Maltese passport.

== Career statistics ==
=== International ===
As of 12 June 2022

Malta
Year	Apps	Goals
2019	2	0
2022	5	0
Total	7	0
