= Joseph Mbong =

Maltese footballer

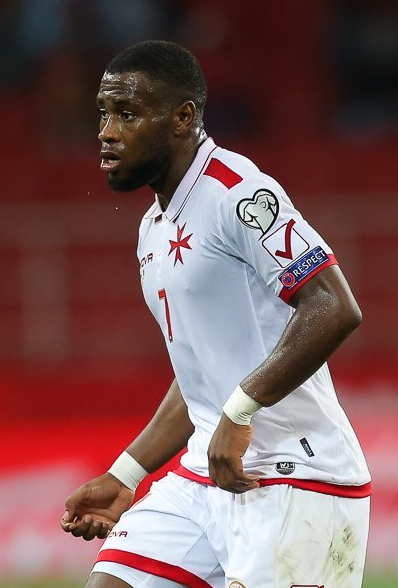
- Mbong playing for Malta in 2021

Personal information
- Full name: Joseph Essien Mbong
- Date of birth: 15 July 1997 (age 29)
- Place of birth: Lagos, Nigeria
- Height: 1.73 m (5 ft 8 in)
- Position: Wing-back

Team information
- Current team: Hibernians
- Number: 10

Youth career
- –2014: Hibernians

Senior career*
Years	Team	Apps	(Gls)
2014–2020	Hibernians	112	(6)
2017	→ Inter Zaprešić (loan)	0	(0)
2020–2026	Ħamrun Spartans	146	(30)
2022–2023	→ Ironi Kiryat Shmona (loan)	15	(0)
2026–	Hibernians	0	(0)

International career^{‡}
2014	Malta U17	4	(1)
2014–2015	Malta U19	6	(0)
2015–2016	Malta U21	14	(1)
2018–	Malta	79	(6)
- * Club domestic league appearances and goals as of 7 May 2026 ‡ National team caps and goals as of 21:20, 16 November 2026 (UTC)

Joseph Essien Mbong (born 15 July 1997) is a professional footballer who plays as a wing-back for Maltese side Hibernians. Born in Nigeria, he plays for the Maltese national team.

== Personal life ==
Mbong is of Nigerian descent. His father Essien Mbong was also a footballer and spent most of his career with Hibernians. He is the older brother of fellow Maltese international Paul Mbong and Siggiewi forward Emmanuel Mbong.

== Career statistics ==
=== Club ===
As of match played 21 December 2025

Appearances and goals by club, season and competition
Club	Season	League			National cup (Note: Includes Maltese FA Trophy)		Continental		Other		Total	
Club	Season	Division	Apps	Goals	Apps	Goals	Apps	Goals	Apps	Goals	Apps	Goals
Hibernians	2014–15	Maltese Premier League	16	0	4	1	1 (Note: Appearance(s) in UEFA Europa League)	0	—		21	1
Hibernians	2015–16	Maltese Premier League	19	0	1	0	2 (Note: Appearances in UEFA Champions League)	0	0	0	22	0
Hibernians	2016–17	Maltese Premier League	17	0	0	0	2	0	—		19	0
Hibernians	2017–18	Maltese Premier League	21	1	2	0	4	0	1 (Note: Appearance in Maltese Super Cup)	0	28	1
Hibernians	2018–19	Maltese Premier League	26	3	2	1	—		—		28	4
Hibernians	2019–20	Maltese Premier League	18	2	2	0	2	0	—		22	2
Hibernians	Total		117	6	11	2	11	0	1	0	140	8
Inter Zaprešić (loan)	2016–17	Croatian First League	0	0	0	0	—		—		0	0
Ħamrun Spartans	2020–21	Maltese Premier League	22	7	1	0	—		—		23	7
Ħamrun Spartans	2021–22	Maltese Premier League	27	3	3	0	—		—		30	3
Ħamrun Spartans	2022–23	Maltese Premier League	10	0	2	0	0	0	—		12	0
Ħamrun Spartans	2023–24	Maltese Premier League	23	0	3	0	6 (Note: Two appearances and one goal in UEFA Champions League, four appearances and three goals in UEFA Europa Conference League)	4	1	0	33	4
Ħamrun Spartans	2024–25	Maltese Premier League	32	6	3	2	4 (Note: Two appearances in UEFA Champions League, two appearances in UEFA Conference League)	0	1	0	40	8
Ħamrun Spartans	2025–26	Maltese Premier League	14	3	0	0	13 (Note: Four appearances and one goal in UEFA Champions League, two appearances and one goal in UEFA Europa League, seven appearances in UEFA Conference League)	2	0	0	27	5
Ħamrun Spartans	Total		128	19	12	2	23	6	2	0	165	28
Ironi Kiryat Shmona (loan)	2022–23	Israeli Premier League	15	0	0	0	—		4 (Note: Appearances in Toto Cup)	1	19	1
Career total			260	25	23	4	34	6	7	1	324	36

=== International ===
As of match played 16 November 2026

Appearances and goals by national team and year
National team	Year	Apps	Goals
Malta	2018	8	0
Malta	2019	10	0
Malta	2020	6	0
Malta	2021	11	2
Malta	2022	9	0
Malta	2023	10	1
Malta	2024	7	0
Malta	2025	10	0
Malta	2026	8	3
Total		79	6

Scores and results list Malta's goal tally first, score column indicates score after each Mbong goal.

List of international goals scored by Joseph Mbong
No.	Date	Venue	Opponent	Score	Result	Competition	Ref.
1	24 March 2021	National Stadium, Ta' Qali, Malta	Russia	1–2	1–3	2022 FIFA World Cup qualification	
2	1 September 2021	National Stadium, Ta' Qali, Malta	Cyprus	2–0	3–0	2022 FIFA World Cup qualification	
3	6 September 2023	National Stadium, Ta' Qali, Malta	Gibraltar	1–0	1–0	Friendly	
4	1 June 2026	DAC Aréna, Dunajská Streda, Slovakia	Slovakia	1–1	1–2	Friendly	
5	5 June 2026	Haladás Sportkomplexum, Szombathely, Hungary	Azerbaijan	1–0	2–0	Friendly	
6	1 October 2026	National Stadium, Ta' Qali, Malta	Gibraltar	1–0	1–1	2026–27 UEFA Nations League D	

== Honours ==
Ħamrun Spartans

- Maltese Premier League: 2020–21, 2022–23, 2023–24, 2024–25
- Maltese Super Cup: 2023, 2024

Individual

- Maltese Premier League top scorer: 2023–24 (shared with Yuri)
