= MFA Pre-Season Summer Cup =

Pre-Season Summer Cup
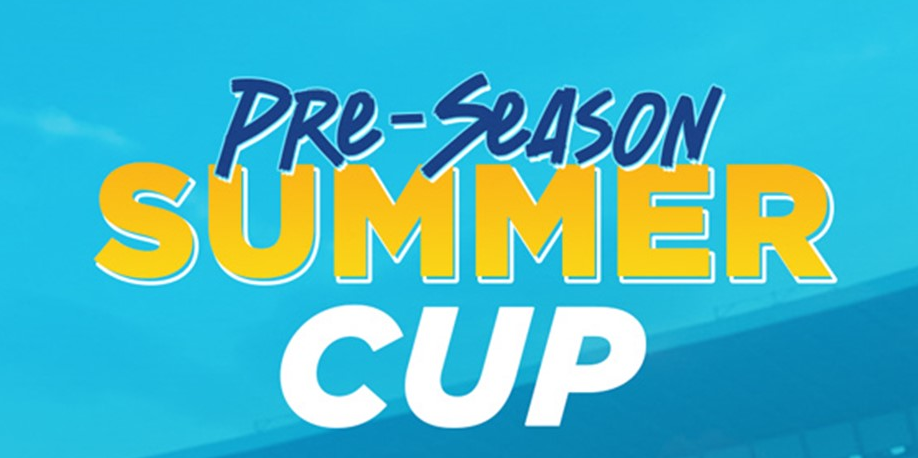
- Founded: 2024
- Region: Malta
- Teams: 4
- Current champions: Sliema Wanderers (first title)
- Most championships: Sliema Wanderers (1 title)
- Broadcaster: TVMSport+

The MFA Pre-Season Summer Cup, also simply referred to as the Summer Cup, is a club competition organised by the Malta Football Association and contested by the four clubs which participated in UEFA competitions that season.

== History ==
The Pre-Season Summer Cup is generally considered to be the successor of the Euro Cup, which was held between 1982 and 2012 under the same format. The modern version of the competition was first held in 2024 and was contested by four teams; Floriana F.C., Ħamrun Spartans F.C., Marsaxlokk F.C. and Sliema Wanderers F.C.. The first Semi-Final was played between Ħamrun Spartans and Marsaxlokk, while the second semi-final was played between Floriana and Sliema Wanderers. Both semi-finals ended in penalty shootouts, with Ħamrun Spartans and Sliema Wanderers making it to the final. The final was played on 11 August 2024 and ended in a 2–1 win for Sliema Wanderers.

== Format ==
The competition is contested by the four teams which had participated in UEFA competitions that season. Two, single-leg semi-finals are played to determine the finalists. If there is no winner after 90 minutes, the match does not go to extra time but rather directly to a penalty shootout. A final is played to determine the winner.

== Winners and Finalists ==
Season	Winner	Score	Runner-up	Venue
2024-25	Sliema Wanderers	2-1	Ħamrun Spartans	National Stadium, Ta' Qali
