= Nevin Portelli =

Maltese footballer

Personal information
- Date of birth: 16 September 1999 (age 27)
- Height: 1.87 m (6 ft 2 in)
- Position: Winger

Team information
- Current team: Marsaxlokk
- Number: 7

Youth career
- –2018: Pembroke Athleta
- 2018–2019: Birkirkara

Senior career*
Years	Team	Apps	(Gls)
2019–2020	Tarxien Rainbows	11	(0)
2020–2022	Gżira United	40	(2)
2022	Audace 1919		
2022–2023	SPQV Velletri		
2023–2024	Legnano	0	(0)
2024–	Marsaxlokk	18	(3)

International career^{‡}
2019–2020	Malta U21	3	(0)
2024–	Malta	1	(0)
- * Club domestic league appearances and goals as of 6 October 2025 ‡ National team caps and goals as of 21 March 2024

Nevin Portelli (born 16 September 1999) is a Maltese football player who plays as a winger for Marsaxlokk and the Malta national team.

== International career ==
Portelli made his debut for the senior Malta national team on 21 March 2024 in a friendly against Slovenia.
