= Sven Xerri =

Maltese footballer (born 2005)

Personal information
- Date of birth: 10 February 2005 (age 21)
- Position: Centre-back

Team information
- Current team: Hamrun Spartans
- Number: 5

Youth career
- Hamrun Spartans

Senior career*
Years	Team	Apps	(Gls)
2021–	Hamrun Spartans	62	(0)
2023–2024	→ St. Lucia (loan)	25	(0)

International career^{‡}
2021–2022	Malta U17	6	(0)
2022	Malta U18	2	(0)
2022–2024	Malta U19	17	(3)
2024–	Malta U21	11	(0)
- * Club domestic league appearances and goals as of 7 May 2026 ‡ National team caps and goals as of 18 November 2025

Sven Xerri (born 10 February 2005) is a Maltese footballer who plays for the Maltese Premier League team Ħamrun Spartans. He also plays for the Maltese U21 national team.

== Club career ==
Xerri is a product of Ħamrun Spartans' youth academy. He made his debut for Ħamrun Spartans on 23 October 2021 against Gudja United in the Maltese Premier league, resulting in a 3–1 victory. In 2022, Xerri went on a trial at Serie B side AC Monza, however he did not join the team. In 2023, he joined Santa Lucia FC, on loan for one year from Ħamrun Spartans. During his time at Santa Lucia, he made 27 appearances in all competitions. In 2024, he made his European debut in the Europa Conference League Second Qualifying Round against FC Ballkani, resulting in a 0–0 draw.

== International career ==
Sven Xerri made 10 appearances with the Maltese Under 19 National Team. He was also part of the Maltese Squad which participated in the 2023 UEFA Under 19 Championship. Since then, He has also made 5 appearances with the Maltese U21 National Team.

== Honours ==
=== Ħamrun Spartans ===
Maltese Premier League: 2020/21, 2022/23, 2024/25

MFA Pre-Season Summer Cup: Runner up 2024

Maltese Super Cup: 2024

=== Personal Honours ===
MFA Young Player of the Year: 2024/25
