= Leandro Lacunza =

Argentine footballer

Personal information
- Full name: Leandro Lautaro Lacunza
- Date of birth: 21 July 1997 (age 29)
- Place of birth: Punta Alta, Argentina
- Height: 1.76 m (5 ft 9 in)
- Position: Right-back

Team information
- Current team: Birkirkara
- Number: 24

Youth career
- Rosario Puerto Belgrano
- Olimpo

Senior career*
Years	Team	Apps	(Gls)
2016–2020	Olimpo	45	(0)
2020–2021	Guillermo Brown	13	(1)
2022–2023	Chacarita Juniors	5	(0)
2023–2024	Alvarado	24	(0)
2024–	Birkirkara	50	(4)
- * Club domestic league appearances and goals as of 18 May 2026

Leandro Lautaro Lacunza (born 21 July 1997) is an Argentine professional footballer who plays as a right-back for Maltese club Birkirkara.

== Career ==
Lacunza's senior career got underway with Olimpo, after he had come through the youth system of Rosario Puerto Belgrano. Christian Díaz selected him for his debut during the 2016 Primera División, with Lacunza playing the full duration of a home draw against Banfield on 9 May. He made another appearance a week later versus Patronato, though ended the match prematurely after eighty-one minutes due to a red card. He wasn't picked in any competitive matches throughout 2016–17, but went on to feature nine times in 2017–18 as the club suffered relegation.

On 20 November 2020, Lacunza joined Primera Nacional club Guillermo Brown. Ahead of the 2022 season, he moved to fellow league club Chacarita Juniors.

== Career statistics ==
As of 1 March 2019.

Appearances and goals by club, season and competition
Club	Season	League			Cup		Continental		Other		Total	
Club	Season	Division	Apps	Goals	Apps	Goals	Apps	Goals	Apps	Goals	Apps	Goals
Olimpo	2016	Primera División	2	0	1	0	—		0	0	3	0
Olimpo	2016–17	Primera División	0	0	0	0	—		0	0	0	0
Olimpo	2017–18	Primera División	9	0	0	0	—		0	0	9	0
Olimpo	2018–19	Primera B Nacional	15	0	2	0	—		0	0	17	0
Career total			26	0	3	0	—		0	0	29	0
