= Kléri Serber =

French footballer (born 1998)

Personal information
- Date of birth: 3 July 1998 (age 28)
- Place of birth: Rillieux-la-Pape, France
- Height: 1.72 m (5 ft 8 in)
- Position: Midfielder

Team information
- Current team: Ħamrun Spartans
- Number: 10

Youth career
- 2004–2006: O de Rillieux
- 2006–2016: Lyon

Senior career*
Years	Team	Apps	(Gls)
2016–2019	Nîmes II	49	(6)
2019–2021	Sète	31	(4)
2021–	Toulouse II	21	(1)
2021	→ Sète (loan)	15	(0)
2022–2023	→ Botev Vratsa (loan)	24	(1)
2024	→ Botev Vratsa (loan)	13	(1)
2024–2025	→ Septemvri Sofia (loan)	43	(1)
2026–	Ħamrun Spartans	9	(0)

International career^{‡}
2014	France U16	4	(0)
- * Club domestic league appearances and goals as of 7 May 2026 ‡ National team caps and goals as of 21:02, 4 August 2023 (UTC)

Kléri Serber (born 3 July 1998) is a French professional footballer who plays as a midfielder for Maltese club Ħamrun Spartans on loan from Toulouse.

== Career ==
Serber is a youth product of his local club O de Rillieux, before joining the youth academy of Lyon in 2006. After a decade there, he moved to the reserves of Nîmes in 2016. He joined Sète in the Championnat National in the summer of 2019 On 21 January 2021, he transferred to the Ligue 1 club Toulouse, and immediately returned to Sète on loan for the second half of the season. He returned to Toulouse's reserves for the 2021–22 season before joining the Bulgarian club Botev Vratsa for the following season on 30 August 2022.

On 1 February 2024, Serber was loaned to Botev Vratsa once again. In September 2024, he joined Septemvri Sofia, once again on loan.

== International career ==
Born in France, He is a youth international for France, having played for the France U16s in 2014.
