= Matías García (footballer, born 1996) =

Maltese footballer

Personal information
- Full name: Matías Nicolás García
- Date of birth: 22 July 1996 (age 30)
- Place of birth: La Banda, Argentina
- Height: 1.80 m (5 ft 11 in)
- Position: Defensive midfielder

Team information
- Current team: Ħamrun Spartans
- Number: 8

Youth career
- Sarmiento La Banda
- 2010–2017: Belgrano

Senior career*
Years	Team	Apps	(Gls)
2017–2019	Senglea Athletic	45	(7)
2019–2025	Floriana	125	(7)
2025–	Ħamrun Spartans	26	(4)

International career^{‡}
2022–2025	Malta	2	(0)
- * Club domestic league appearances and goals as of 7 May 2026 ‡ National team caps and goals as of 26 June 2025

Matías Nicolás García (born 22 July 1996) is a professional footballer who plays as a defensive midfielder for Maltese Premier League club Ħamrun Spartans. Born in Argentina, he plays for the Malta national team.

== Club career ==
García is a youth product of Sarmiento La Banda and Belgrano. From Belgrano, he moved to Malta with Senglea Athletic in 2017. He transferred to Floriana in 2019, and helped them win the 2019–20 Maltese Premier League in his debut season with them.

== International career ==
García was born in Argentina and naturalized in Malta after spending five years in the country. In late May 2022, it was announced that García had been awarded a Maltese passport and was eligible to represent Malta. He was called up to the Malta national football team for UEFA Nations League matches in June 2022. He debuted with Malta in a friendly 1–0 loss to Venezuela on 1 June 2022.

== Career statistics ==
As of match played 21 December 2025

Appearances and goals by club, season and competition
Club	Season	League			FA Trophy		Europe		Other		Total	
Club	Season	Division	Apps	Goals	Apps	Goals	Apps	Goals	Apps	Goals	Apps	Goals
Ħamrun Spartans	2025–26	Maltese Premier League	10	4	0	0	11 (Note: Three appearances in UEFA Champions League, two appearances in UEFA Europa League, six appearances in UEFA Conference League)	0	0	0	21	4
Career total			10	4	0	0	11	0	0	0	21	4

== Honours ==
Floriana

- Maltese Premier League: 2019–20
- Maltese FA Trophy: 2021–22
