= Jovan Čađenović =

Montenegrin footballer (born 1995)

Personal information
- Date of birth: 13 January 1995 (age 31)
- Place of birth: Cetinje, FR Yugoslavia
- Height: 1.85 m (6 ft 1 in)
- Position: Defensive midfielder

Team information
- Current team: Sutjeska
- Number: 20

Youth career
- 2010–2014: Partizan

Senior career*
| Years | Team | Apps | (Gls) |
| 2014–2015 | Teleoptik | 22 | (0) |
| 2015–2017 | Partizan | 0 | (0) |
| 2015–2016 | → Teleoptik (loan) | 26 | (3) |
| 2016–2017 | → Bežanija (loan) | 21 | (0) |
| 2017 | Zemun | 2 | (0) |
| 2017–2018 | Borac Čačak | 29 | (0) |
| 2018–2019 | Sūduva | 27 | (0) |
| 2020 | Taraz | 20 | (1) |
| 2021 | Kaisar | 21 | (1) |
| 2022 | Metalac Gornji Milanovac | 10 | (1) |
| 2022–2024 | Panevėžys | 76 | (4) |
| 2025–2026 | Ħamrun Spartans | 30 | (1) |
| 2026– | Sutjeska | 15 | (0) |

International career^{‡}
| 2011 | Montenegro U17 | 2 | (0) |
| 2014 | Montenegro U19 | 3 | (0) |
- * Club domestic league appearances and goals as of 17 June 2026 ‡ National team caps and goals as of 23 June 2017

Jovan Čađenović (Serbian Cyrillic: Јован Чађеновић; born 13 January 1995) is a Montenegrin footballer who plays for Sutjeska.

== Club career ==
Born in Cetinje, Čađenović joined FK Partizan at the age of 15 and passed all youth categories with the club. After a season he spent as a scholar of the satellite club Teleoptik, Čađenović signed his first professional contract with Partizan on 10 July 2015. Later, same year he extended his loan spell at Teleoptik for the 2015–16 season. After the 2015–16 Serbian First League season he spent with Bežanija, Čađenović moved to Zemun in summer 2017. On the last day of the summer transfer window 2017, Čađenović moved to Borac Čačak.

In 15 November 2019 ended contact with Lithuanian Sūduva. Since 2018 to 2019 season he defended Sūduva's honour in 27 matches of Lithuanian A Lyga, also in Lithuanian Cup and European tournaments.

On 21 January 2020 he signed with Kazakhstan Premier League club Taraz.

In December 2024, he agreed to sign for Ħamrun Spartans.

== Career statistics ==
As of 10 September 2017

| Club | Season | League | | | Cup | | Continental | | Other | | Total | |
| Club | Season | Division | Apps | Goals | Apps | Goals | Apps | Goals | Apps | Goals | Apps | Goals |
|---|---|---|---|---|---|---|---|---|---|---|---|---|
| Teleoptik | 2014–15 | Serbian League Belgrade | 22 | 0 | — | | — | | — | | 22 | 0 |
| Teleoptik (loan) | 2015–16 | Serbian League Belgrade | 26 | 3 | — | | — | | — | | 26 | 3 |
| Bežanija (loan) | 2015–16 | Serbian First League | 21 | 0 | 0 | 0 | — | | — | | 21 | 0 |
| Zemun | 2017–18 | Serbian SuperLiga | 2 | 0 | — | | — | | — | | 2 | 0 |
| Borac Čačak | 2017–18 | Serbian SuperLiga | 1 | 0 | 0 | 0 | — | | — | | 1 | 0 |
| Career total | | | 73 | 3 | 0 | 0 | — | | — | | 73 | 3 |
