= Kean Scicluna =

Maltese footballer (born 2006)

Personal information
- Full name: Kean Scicluna
- Date of birth: September 12, 2006 (age 20)
- Position: Defensive midfielder

Team information
- Current team: Żabbar St. Patrick, on loan from Ħamrun Spartans
- Number: 55

Youth career
- Qormi
- Ħamrun Spartans

Senior career*
Years	Team	Apps	(Gls)
2023–	Ħamrun Spartans	10	(1)
2025–	→ Żabbar St. Patrick (loan)	8	(0)

International career^{‡}
2025–	Malta	2	(0)
- * Club domestic league appearances and goals as of 6 November 2025 ‡ National team caps and goals as of 17:00, 1 June 2026 (UTC)

Kean Scicluna (born 12 September 2006) is a Maltese footballer who plays as a defensive midfielder for Żabbar St. Patrick F.C., on loan from Ħamrun Spartans F.C., and the Malta national team.

== Club career ==
Scicluna came through the Qormi academy before moving to Ħamrun Spartans, where he made senior league appearances in the Maltese Premier League.

On 18 July 2025 he joined newly promoted Żabbar St. Patrick on loan from Ħamrun Spartans for the 2025–26 season. He featured regularly in the opening round of the Premier League season for Żabbar.

== International career ==
Scicluna made his senior international debut for Malta on 9 September 2025 in a 3–1 friendly win over San Marino at Ta’ Qali.

== Style of play ==
Primarily a defensive midfielder, Scicluna has also been deployed at centre-back.

== Honours ==
Ħamrun Spartans

- Maltese Super Cup: 2024
