= Eder (footballer, born 1989) =

Brazilian footballer

Éder
Personal information
- Full name: Éderson Bruno Domingos
- Date of birth: August 21, 1989 (age 37)
- Place of birth: Jacarezinho, Brazil
- Height: 1.71 m (5 ft 7 in)
- Position: Winger

Team information
- Current team: Ħamrun Spartans
- Number: 25

Youth career
- Internacional

Senior career*
Years	Team	Apps	(Gls)
2008–2009	Internacional	36	(2)
2009	→ Yokohama FC (loan)	10	(2)
2009–2011	Yokohama FC	26	(0)
2012–2013	Ypiranga	8	(0)
2013	Canoas	10	(2)
2013–2014	Ferroviário		
2014	Veranópolis	11	(2)
2014	Novo Hamburgo	3	(0)
2014–2015	Brasil de Pelotas	4	(0)
2015	Lajeadense	9	(0)
2015–2016	Glória	12	(3)
2016	São José-PA	4	(1)
2016	Luverdense	2	(0)
2017	Ypiranga	2	(0)
2018	São Luiz	0	(0)
2018	Esportivo		
2018	Caxias	12	(2)
2019	ABC	0	(0)
2019–2020	Aimoré	0	(0)
2020–2021	América-RN	10	(0)
2021–2022	Nadur Youngsters	24	(9)
2022–	Ħamrun Spartans	87	(5)
- * Club domestic league appearances and goals as of 7 May 2026

Éderson Bruno Domingos (born August 21, 1989), known as Éder, is a Brazilian football player who plays as a winger for Ħamrun Spartans.

== Club statistics ==
Club performance			League		Cup		Total	
Season	Club	League	Apps	Goals	Apps	Goals	Apps	Goals
Japan			League		Emperor's Cup		Total	
2009	Yokohama FC	J2 League	10	2	2	0	12	2
2010	Yokohama FC	J2 League	19	0	1	0	20	0
2011	Yokohama FC	J2 League	7	0	1	0	8	0
Country	Japan		36	2	4	0	40	2
Total			36	2	4	0	40	2
