= Marcelina Emerson =

Brazilian footballer (born 1991)

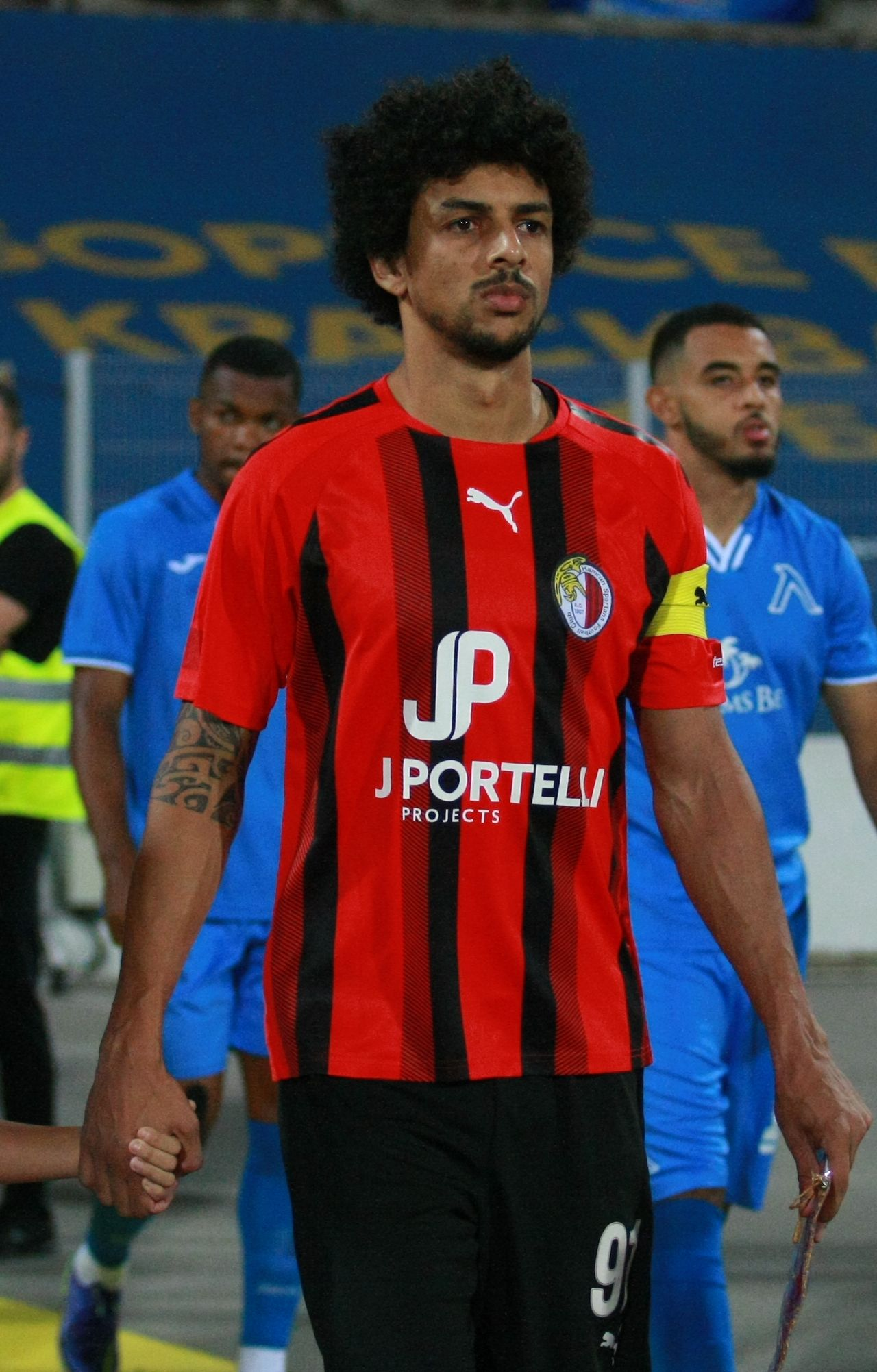

Personal information
- Date of birth: 24 February 1991 (age 35)
- Place of birth: Brazil
- Position: Midfielder

Team information
- Current team: Ħamrun Spartans
- Number: 91

Senior career*
Years	Team	Apps	(Gls)
2010–2011	Hellas Verona	2	(0)
2012	Jabaquara		
2013	Imbituba		
2013	Viitorul Constanța	9	(0)
2014–2015	Floriana	30	(0)
2015–2017	Birkirkara	14	(0)
2016	→ Floriana (loan)	11	(1)
2016–2017	→ Tarxien Rainbows (loan)	26	(1)
2017–2019	Floriana	44	(3)
2019–2020	Nadur Youngsters		
2020–	Ħamrun Spartans	143	(5)
- * Club domestic league appearances and goals as of 7 May 2026

Marcelina Emerson (born 24 February 1991) is a Brazilian professional footballer who plays as a midfielder for Maltese Premier League club Ħamrun Spartans. In 2013 he went with fellow Brazilian player, Thiago Araújo to play in Romania for Liga I club Viitorul Constanța.

== Personal life ==
In January 2025, Emerson reportedly submitted the requested paperwork to apply for Maltese citizenship, having resided in the island country since 2014.

== Honours ==
Floriana

- Maltese Super Cup: 2017

Ħamrun Spartans

- Maltese Premier League: 2020–21, 2022–23, 2023–24, 2024–25
- Maltese Super Cup: 2023, 2024
