= Danilo Bulevardi =

Italian footballer (born 1995)

Personal information
- Date of birth: 31 January 1995 (age 31)
- Place of birth: Mazara del Vallo, Italy
- Height: 1.76 m (5 ft 9 1/2 in)
- Position: Midfielder

Team information
- Current team: Hamrun Spartans
- Number: 31

Youth career
- Mazara
- –2014: Pescara

Senior career*
Years	Team	Apps	(Gls)
2014–2017	Pescara	2	(0)
2014–2015	→ Ischia (loan)	30	(1)
2016	→ L'Aquila (loan)	11	(1)
2016–2017	→ Teramo (loan)	19	(4)
2017	→ Pordenone (loan)	11	(1)
2017–2019	Robur Siena	56	(1)
2019–2020	Cavese	20	(0)
2020–2021	Legnago	33	(6)
2021–2024	Gubbio	81	(11)
2024–2025	Monopoli	39	(3)
2025–2026	Virtus Verona	17	(1)
2026–	Hamrun Spartans	14	(0)

International career^{‡}
2022–	Sicily	1	(1)
- * Club domestic league appearances and goals as of 7 May 2026 ‡ National team caps and goals as of 10 June 2022

Danilo Bulevardi (born 31 January 1995) is an Italian footballer who plays as a midfielder for Maltese club Hamrun Spartans.

== Club career ==
He made his Serie B debut for Pescara on 30 May 2014 in a game against Empoli.

On 27 September 2019, he signed a 1-year contract with an additional 1-year extension option with Serie C club Cavese.

On 11 August 2021, he joined to Gubbio.
