= Hamrun Spartans F.C. =

Maltese association football club

Ħamrun Spartans
- Full name: Ħamrun Spartans Football Club
- Nicknames: Tas-Sikkina (The Knives); Ta' Werwer (The Terrors)
- Founded: 1907; 119 years ago
- Ground: Victor Tedesco Stadium
- Capacity: 2,000
- Chairman: Joseph Portelli
- Manager: Daniel Portela
- League: Maltese Premier League
- 2025–26: Maltese Premier League, 3rd of 12
- Website: https://hamrunspartansfc.com/
Home colours	Away colours	Third colours

The Ħamrun Spartans Football Club is a Maltese professional football club based in Ħamrun. Since being founded in 1907, Ħamrun Spartans have won 11 league championships, the latest one being in 2025, while being runners-up eleven times.

Ħamrun became the first Maltese side to reach the main phase of a European club competition, qualifying for the 2025–26 UEFA Conference League after defeating RFS of Latvia in the play-off round. They then exited in the group stages after placing 33rd, finishing 4 points off a play-off spot. They also became the first Maltese side to win a game in the main phase of a European club competition, defeating Lincoln Red Imps 3-1.

== History ==
=== Foundation ===
The Ħamrun Spartans were founded in 1907. By season 1913–14, Ħamrun Spartans were already an established team on the local scene winning the title during that season thanks to a better goal-average than St. George's. Their second League success came four years later when they finished again in joint top-spot with St. George's. This time, the Spartans were crowned champions of Malta by beating them in a playoff. Ħamrun's top player at that time was Gejtu Psaila, known as il-Haċċa. In the 1920s and 1930s, the club went through a difficult period as most Ħamrun players left to join other clubs.

A new team, Ħamrun Liberty, was formed and in just a couple of years, Ħamrun Liberty was among the elite of Maltese football. On their return to the First Division in 1946–47, the club changed its name to Ħamrun Spartans. They were soon a hit as they won the Johnnie Walker Championship Trophy, winning also the Cassar Cup. They won the Cassar Cup again in 1948–49 season. For four times between 1947 and 1952, they were four times runners-up.

The team started dwindling down in the 60's until they were relegated in the season 1969–70. After returning to the First Division, they were relegated once again in 1973–74. However, after two years in the Second Division, they were back in the First Division.

=== Anniversary and successes ===
On the 75th anniversary, exactly during the season 1982–83, the club was back at the top winning the title after an absence of 36 years. Ħamrun also won the FA Trophy during that season. That was the beginning of an era under the guide of president Victor Tedesco. The team was strengthened with top players like Gigi Salerno, Raymond and George Xuereb, Edwin Farrugia, Raymond Vella, Joe Brincat and Carlo Seychell. Alfred Cardona was their coach. After a lot of disputes with the Immigration Division, Victor Tedesco signed two foreigners, Englishmen Peter Hatch and John Linacre – the first foreigners to play on the island after a long period of time.

The Spartans set a new record being the first local team to win both the home and away legs in a UEFA competition after beating Ballymena of Northern Ireland. In just under a decade, from season 1982-83 till season 1991-92 Ħamrun have won the Maltese Premier League four times, the Maltese FA Trophy 6 times and the Maltese Super Cup 5 times, amongst others.

=== Dark period: Relegations and match fixing allegation ===
After such successful campaigns, the Spartans faced financial difficulties. The team had to transfer its best players until finally they were relegated to the First Division in 1998–99. After one year, they were promoted back to the Premier League after winning the Division 1 title. Financial difficulties persisted and they were relegated back to the Maltese Challenge League (First Division at the time) at the end of season 2003–04, winning promotion as First Division champions in 2004–05, being relegated in 2005–06 and winning the First Division championship once again in 2006–07.

Following the promotion to the Maltese Premier League the Spartans finished in 6th place during the 2007–08 campaign, and also made their way to the final of the FA Trophy against Birkirkara FC losing the cup to a last minute goal. This season was also a great success to its supporters after winning the Malta Best Support Award.

Ħamrun Spartans faced more difficulties and albeit staying in the top division for some years, they were relegated to the Maltese First Division in the 2012–13 season, and to the Maltese Second Division during the 2013-14 campaign – the worst ever placing in their history. In 2014, after goalkeeper Andrea Cassar reported two officials for match fixing, the club was charged with match fixing and relegated to the first division.Ħamrun Spartans gained promotion from the Second Division by placing second during season 2014–15.

=== Recovery ===
The 2015–16 season ended successfully for Ħamrun Spartans FC. The team finished in second place in the First Division and was subsequently promoted to the Premier Division after an absence of four years. In this period the administration of the club improved greatly and many difficulties, mainly financial, were surmounted. New enthusiasm and optimism embraced the club. The supporters were looking forward for a fresh start.

The 2018–19 season was a very positive one where the team, led by Italian coach Giovanni Tedesco defied the odds and finished in 4th place after getting a 94th-minute equaliser in the last match of the season against arch rivals Valletta F.C. which result forced the latter to play a decider for the Championship title. Hamrun fans hoped that European club football was once again in reach after an absence of 26 years, however Balzan beat Valletta in the final of the FA Trophy, which meant that Balzan won the 4th and last Maltese berth for European football during the next season.

During the 2019–20 season, Italian coach Manuele Blasi took control of the team. The team performed well initially but due to financial difficulties had to release key players. Blasi was replaced by Andrea Ciaramella in early 2020 with the team ending in 9th position when the league was suspended due to the Covid pandemic in March 2020 with 6 matches left to play.

=== New ownership and historic European debut (2020–present) ===
In the summer of 2020 intense negotiations took place to find solid financial backing for Hamrun Spartans F.C. These proved successful when Joseph Portelli agreed to take control of the club. The club immediately signed three of the most promising young Malta National Team players - Juan Carlos Corbalan, Joseph Mbong and Matthew Guillaumier. A professional corporate image was given to the club and it began the 2020–21 season strongly, sitting top of the league at the end of 2020. After the halt of the league decided by the Malta Football Association during April, the Spartans were declared champions of the league, 30 years after winning their last title.

On 9 June 2021, the club was excluded from participating in the 2021–22 UEFA Champions League for being involved in a match fixing scandal back in 2013.

On 11 August 2022, after a victory over Levski Sofia on penalties in the third qualifying round of 2022–23 UEFA Europa Conference League, Ħamrun became the first ever Maltese side to reach the play-off stage of a UEFA club competition; where they played against the famous Serbian club Partizan, who proved too strong. Having lost 4–1 in Belgrade in the first leg, Ħamrun managed to achieve a highly respectable and entertaining 3–3 draw in the second leg back in Malta. The Spartans had beaten Alashkert, Velež Mostar and Levski Sofia in the first three rounds of qualifying to set up a meeting with the Serbian side.

On 4 May 2024, Ħamrun cemented their season after a 1–1 draw against Hibernians and lifted their 10th premier league trophy during 2023–24 Maltese Premier League. The achievement means that the Spartans could finally add the first golden star above the club badge after permission by Malta Premier League.

On 28 August 2025, Ħamrun became the first ever Maltese side to reach the league phase of a major European club competition, qualifying for the 2025–26 UEFA Conference League after defeating RFS of Latvia in the play-off round. Ħamrun also secured a lucrative financial reward for both the club and the football league in Malta. The club guaranteed itself a base payout of around €3.2 million from UEFA. Prize money distributed to other clubs will now be divided among 11 teams rather than 12, ensuring a larger share for each. Later that year, on 27 November, they secured their first win in the European competition in a 3–1 victory over Lincoln Red Imps.

== Club officials ==
=== Technical staff ===
- Head Coach: Giacomo Modica
- Assistant Coach: Vincenzo Modica
- Technical Collaborator: Maurizio Miranda
- Match Analyst: Giacalone Pietro
- Fitness Coach: Alessandro Ruspantini
- Goalkeepers Coach: Matthew Farrugia
- Team Manager: David Camilleri
- Kit Manager: Gilbert Camilleri
- Assistant Kit Managers: Jason Mangani, Francesco Joseph Galea

=== Management ===
- President: Joseph Portelli
- Vice President: Gaetano Debattista
- Secretary: Stephen Saliba
- Treasurer: Antoine Attard
- International Relations: Victor Cassar
- Spiritual Director: Rev. Anton Portelli

== Current squad ==
As of 14 July 2026

Note: Flags indicate national team as defined under FIFA eligibility rules; some limited exceptions apply. Players may hold more than one non-FIFA nationality.

No.	Pos.	Nation	Player
2	DF	BRA	Rafael Compri
3	DF	NOR	Tobias Bjørnstad
5	DF	MLT	Sven Xerri
6	MF	MLT	Matthew Guillaumier
7	FW	MLT	Shaisen Attard
8	MF	MLT	Jake Grech
9	FW	COL	Damir Ceter
10	FW	BRA	Lucas Villela
13	DF	ITA	Vincenzo Polito
15	MF	MLT	Kean Scicluna
17	MF	FRA	Kléri Serber
18	MF	NGR	Jack Ipalibo
20	DF	CGO	Messie Biatoumoussoka
21	MF	MLT	Daniel Letherby
23	GK	MLT	Matthias Debono

No.	Pos.	Nation	Player
24	MF	MLT	Scott Camilleri
25	FW	BRA	Éder
27	MF	SRB	Ognjen Bjeličić
31	MF	ITA	Danilo Bulevardi
47	MF	ARG	Gonzalo Virano
70	FW	ITA	Saliou Thioune
77	MF	BRA	Marcelo
88	MF	CRO	Ante Ćorić
91	MF	BRA	Emerson
92	GK	MLT	Keane Brincau
94	DF	MLT	Ryan Camenzuli
98	GK	BRA	Célio
99	FW	LBR	Emmanuel Ernest
—	MF	MLT	Matías García

=== Out on loan ===
Note: Flags indicate national team as defined under FIFA eligibility rules; some limited exceptions apply. Players may hold more than one non-FIFA nationality.

No.	Pos.	Nation	Player
—	MF	MLT	Miguel Tabone (at Fgura United until 30 June 2026)
—	FW	MLT	Trezeguet Zammit (at Sirens until 30 June 2026)

== Former players ==
- (Italy) Orazio Sorbello
- (England) Tony Morley
- (Italy) Cristian Zaccardo
- (Germany) Heiner Backhaus

== Historical list of coaches ==
- (Malta) Lolly Debattista (1975–76)
- (Malta) Alfred Cardona (1982–83)
- (Scotland) Danny McLennan (1985–86)
- (Malta) Lolly Aquilina (1987–89)
- (Italy) Terenzio Polverini (1989–90)
- (Malta) Lolly Debattista (1990–93)
- (Malta) Lolly Aquilina (1993–96)
- (Italy) Orazio Sorbello (1996–97)
- (Malta) Patrick Curmi (1997)
- (Malta) Alfred Cutajar (1997)
- (Italy) Orazio Sorbello (1998)
- (Federal Republic of Yugoslavia) Milisav Bogdanović (1998)
- (England) Andy Weavill (1999-2001)
- (Bulgaria) Atanas Marinov (2001–03)
- (Malta) Patrick Curmi (2 Jul 2003 -1 Oct 2003)
- (Bulgaria) Guentcho Dobrev (8 Oct 2003– 10 Mar 04)
- (Malta) Michael Degiorgio (2004– 24 Feb 05)
- (Bulgaria) Atanas Marinov (8 Jul 2006 – 07)
- (Malta) Marco Gerada (2007–08)
- (Malta) Steve D'Amato (Oct 2008–11)
- (Malta) Jesmond Zammit (2011–12)
- (Malta) Stefan Sultana (Feb 2012–13)
- (Italy) Giuseppe Forasassi (2013–14)
- (Malta) Steve D'Amato (2014–16)
- (Malta) Jacques Scerri (2016–18)
- (Italy) Giovanni Tedesco (2018–19)
- (Italy) Manuele Blasi (2019–20)
- (Italy) Andrea Ciaramella (2020)
- (Malta) Mark Buttigieg (2020–2022)
- (Serbia) Branko Nišević (2022–2023)
- (Italy) Luciano Zauri (2023–2024)
- (Italy) Alessandro Zinnari (May 2024 – April 2025)
- (Malta) Winston Muscat (April 2025 – June 2025)
- (Italy) Giacomo Modica (June 2025 – June 2026)
- (Italy) Stefano Sanderra (June 2026 – July 2026)
- (Italy) Marco Amelia (August 2026 – November 2026)

== Honours ==
- Maltese Premier League
  - Winners (11): 1913–14, 1917–18, 1946–47, 1982–83, 1986–87, 1987–88, 1990–91, 2020–21, 2022–23, 2023–24, 2024–25
- Maltese FA Trophy
  - Winners (6): 1982–83, 1983–84, 1986–87, 1987–88, 1988–89, 1991–92
- Maltese Super Cup
  - Winners (7): 1987, 1988, 1989, 1991, 1992, 2023, 2024
- Euro Challenge Cup
  - Winners (4): 1985/86, 1988/89, 1991/92, 1992/93
- Cassar Cup
  - Winners (2): 1947–47, 1948–49
- Super 5 Tournament (Quadrangular Tournament)
  - Winners (1): 1991–92
- Challenge Cup
  - Winners (1): 2024

== European record ==
Season	Competition	Round	Opponent	Home	Away	Aggregate
1983–84	European Cup	1R	(Scotland) Dundee United	0–3	0–3	0–6
1984–85	UEFA Cup Winners' Cup	1R	(Northern Ireland) Ballymena United	2–1	1–0	3–1
1984–85	UEFA Cup Winners' Cup	2R	(Soviet Union) Dynamo Moscow	0–1	0–5	0–6
1985–86	UEFA Cup	1R	(Albania) Dinamo Tirana	0–0	0–1	0–1
1987–88	European Cup	1R	(Austria) Rapid Wien	0–1	0–6	0–7
1988–89	European Cup	1R	(Albania) 17 Nëntori	2–1	0–2	2–3
1989–90	UEFA Cup Winners' Cup	1R	(Spain) Real Valladolid	0–1	0–5	0–6
1991–92	European Cup	1R	(Portugal) Benfica	0–6	0–4	0–10
1992–93	UEFA Cup Winners' Cup	QR	(Slovenia) Maribor	2–1	0–4	2–5
2022–23	UEFA Europa Conference League	1QR	(Armenia) Alashkert	4–1	0–1	4–2
2022–23	UEFA Europa Conference League	2QR	(Bosnia and Herzegovina) Velež Mostar	1–0	1–0	2–0
2022–23	UEFA Europa Conference League	3QR	(Bulgaria) Levski Sofia	0–1	2–1	2–2 (4–1 p)
2022–23	UEFA Europa Conference League	PO	(Serbia) Partizan	3–3	1–4	4–7
2023–24	UEFA Champions League	1QR	(Israel) Maccabi Haifa	0–4	1–2	1–6
2023–24	UEFA Europa Conference League	2QR	(Georgia (country)) Dinamo Tbilisi	2–1	1–0	3–1
2023–24	UEFA Europa Conference League	3QR	(Hungary) Ferencváros	1–6	1–2	2–8
2024–25	UEFA Champions League	1QR	(Gibraltar) Lincoln Red Imps	0–1	1–0 (a.e.t.)	1–1 (4–5 p)
2024–25	UEFA Conference League	2QR	(Kosovo) Ballkani	0–2	0–0	0–2
2025–26	UEFA Champions League	1QR	(Lithuania) Žalgiris	2–0 (a.e.t.)	0–2	2–2 (11–10 p)
2025–26	UEFA Champions League	2QR	(Ukraine) Dynamo Kyiv	0–3	0–3	0–6
2025–26	UEFA Europa League	3QR	(Israel) Maccabi Tel Aviv	1–2	1–3	2–5
2025–26	UEFA Conference League	PO	(Latvia) RFS	1–0	2–2	3–2
2025–26	UEFA Conference League	LP	(Poland) Jagiellonia Białystok	—N/a	0–1	33rd place
2025–26	UEFA Conference League	LP	(Switzerland) Lausanne-Sport	0–1	—N/a	33rd place
2025–26	UEFA Conference League	LP	(Turkey) Samsunspor	—N/a	0–3	33rd place
2025–26	UEFA Conference League	LP	(Gibraltar) Lincoln Red Imps	3–1	—N/a	33rd place
2025–26	UEFA Conference League	LP	(Ukraine) Shakhtar Donetsk	0–2	—N/a	33rd place
2025–26	UEFA Conference League	LP	(Republic of Ireland) Shamrock Rovers	—N/a	1–3	33rd place
2026–27	UEFA Conference League	1QR	(Faroe Islands) NSÍ Runavík	1–2	1–1	2–3

== Seasons ==
- 2025–26 Hamrun Spartans F.C. season
- 2026–27 Hamrun Spartans F.C. season

== Youth Nursery ==
Hamrun Spartans Youth Nursery was founded by Tony Bajada in December 1987. At the time the Nursery catered for around 40 players.
