= Malta national football team results (2020–present) =

- Win Draw Loss

The Malta national football team represents Malta in association football and is controlled by the Malta Football Association (MFA), the governing body of the sport in the country. It competes as a member of the Union of European Football Associations (UEFA), which encompasses the countries of Europe. The team's first official match was played on 24 February 1957 in a 3–2 loss against Austria at the Empire Stadium in Gżira.

The team's largest victory was 7–1 against Liechtenstein on 26 March 2008 in a friendly match. Their worst loss is 12–1 against Spain on 21 December 1983 in a qualifying match for UEFA Euro 1984. Michael Mifsud holds the appearance record for Malta, having been capped 142 times since 2000. Misfud also holds the goalscoring record having scored 41 times. As of February 2021, Malta are ranked 184th in the FIFA World Rankings. Its highest ever ranking of 66th was achieved twice in September 1994 and September 1995.

The first match Malta played in the 2020s was a 3–2 loss against the Faroe Islands in the 2020–21 UEFA Nations League (League D).

== Matches ==
=== 2020 ===
3 September 2020–21 UEFA Nations League	Faroe Islands	3–2	Malta	Tórshavn, Faroe Islands
19:45 UTC+01:00	K. Olsen 25'; A. Olsen 87'; Hendriksson 90+1'	Report	Degabriele 37'; Agius 73'	Stadium: Tórsvøllur; Attendance: 0 Referee: Ádám Farkas (Hungary)

6 September 2020–21 UEFA Nations League	Malta	1–1	Latvia	Ta' Qali, Malta
20:45 UTC+02:00	Nwoko 15'	Report	Guillaumier 25' (o.g.)	Stadium: National Stadium; Attendance: 0 Referee: Stéphanie Frappart (France)

7 October Friendly	Malta	2–0	Gibraltar	Ta' Qali, Malta
18:00 UTC+02:00	Nwoko 8'; Caruana 90'	Report		Stadium: National Stadium; Attendance: 0 Referee: Nikola Popov (Bulgaria)

10 October 2020–21 UEFA Nations League	Andorra	0–0	Malta	Andorra la Vella, Andorra
20:45 UTC+02:00		Report		Stadium: Estadi Nacional; Attendance: 0 Referee: Alain Durieux (Luxembourg)

13 October 2020–21 UEFA Nations League	Latvia	0–1	Malta	Riga, Latvia
19:00 UTC+03:00		Report	Borg 90+7'	Stadium: Daugava Stadium; Attendance: 953; Referee: Iwan Arwel Griffith (Wales)

11 November Friendly	Malta	3–0	Liechtenstein	Ta' Qali, Malta
18:00 UTC+01:00	Mifsud 5'; Borg 20'; Farrugia 84' (pen.)	Report		Stadium: National Stadium; Attendance: 0 Referee: Manfredas Lukjančukas (Lithuania)

14 November 2020–21 UEFA Nations League	Malta	3–1	Andorra	Ta' Qali, Malta
15:00 UTC+01:00	García 56' (o.g.); Degabriele 59'; Dimech 90+3'	Report	Rebés 3'	Stadium: National Stadium; Attendance: 0 Referee: Peter Kralović (Slovakia)

17 November 2020–21 UEFA Nations League	Malta	1–1	Faroe Islands	Ta' Qali, Malta
20:45 UTC+01:00	Guillaumier 54'	Report	Jónsson 70'	Stadium: National Stadium; Attendance: 0 Referee: Kristo Tohver (Estonia)

=== 2021 ===
24 March 2022 FIFA World Cup qualification	Malta	1–3	Russia	Ta' Qali, Malta
20:45 UTC+01:00	Mbong 56'	Report	Dzyuba 23'; Fernandes 35'; Sobolev 90'	Stadium: National Stadium; Attendance: 0 Referee: Peter Kjaesgaard (Denmark)

27 March 2022 FIFA World Cup qualification	Slovakia	2–2	Malta	Trnava, Slovakia
20:45 UTC+01:00	Strelec 49'; Škriniar 53'	Report	Gambin 16'; Satariano 20'	Stadium: Štadión Antona Malatinského; Attendance: 0 Referee: Harald Lechner (Austria)

30 March 2022 FIFA World Cup qualification	Croatia	3–0	Malta	Rijeka, Croatia
20:45 UTC+02:00	Perišić 62'; Modrić 76' (pen.); Brekalo 90'	Report		Stadium: Stadion Rujevica; Attendance: 0 Referee: Lionel Tschudi (Switzerland)

30 May Friendly	Malta	0–3	Northern Ireland	Klagenfurt, Austria
18:00 UTC+02:00		Report	Jones 2'; Whyte 53'; McCann 55'	Stadium: Wörthersee Stadion; Attendance: 0 Referee: Sebastian Gishamer (Austria)

4 June Friendly	Malta	1–2	Kosovo	Klagenfurt, Austria
18:00 UTC+02:00	Dimech 45+2'	Report	Rashica 19', 84'	Stadium: Wörthersee Stadion; Attendance: 0 Referee: Christopher Jäger (Austria)

1 September 2022 FIFA World Cup qualification	Malta	3–0	Cyprus	Ta' Qali, Malta
20:45 UTC+02:00	Attard 44', 54'; J. Mbong 46'	Report		Stadium: National Stadium; Attendance: 2,686; Referee: Fabio Maresca (Italy)

4 September 2022 FIFA World Cup qualification	Slovenia	1–0	Malta	Ljubljana, Slovenia
18:00 UTC+02:00	Lovrić 45' (pen.)	Report		Stadium: Stožice Stadium; Attendance: 4,571; Referee: Andris Treimanis (Latvia)

7 September 2022 FIFA World Cup qualification	Russia	2–0	Malta	Moscow, Russia
21:45 UTC+03:00	Smolov 10'; Bakayev 84' (pen.)	Report		Stadium: Otkritie Arena; Attendance: 15,000; Referee: Ali Palabıyık (Turkey)

8 October 2022 FIFA World Cup qualification	Malta	0–4	Slovenia	Ta' Qali, Malta
20:45 UTC+02:00		Report	Iličić 27', 60'; Šporar 49'; Šeško 67'	Stadium: National Stadium; Attendance: 3,967; Referee: Anastasios Sidiropoulos (Greece)

11 October 2022 FIFA World Cup qualification	Cyprus	2–2	Malta	Larnaca, Cyprus
19:00 UTC+03:00	Papoulis 7'; Sotiriou 80'	Report	Muscat 53'; Degabriele 90+8'	Stadium: AEK Arena – Georgios Karapatakis; Attendance: 1,405; Referee: Dennis Higler (Netherlands)

11 November 2022 FIFA World Cup qualification	Malta	1–7	Croatia	Ta' Qali, Malta
20:45 UTC+01:00	Brozović 31' (o.g.)	Report	Perišić 6'; Ćaleta-Car 22'; Pašalić 39'; Modrić 45+1'; Majer 47', 64'; Kramarić 53'	Stadium: National Stadium; Attendance: 4,581; Referee: Deniz Aytekin (Germany)

14 November 2022 FIFA World Cup qualification	Malta	0–6	Slovakia	Ta' Qali, Malta
15:00 UTC+01:00		Report	Rusnák 6', 16'; Duda 8', 69', 81'; De Marco 72'	Stadium: National Stadium; Attendance: 3,293; Referee: Fran Jović (Croatia)

=== 2022 ===
25 March Friendly	Malta	1–0	Azerbaijan	Ta' Qali, Malta
19:00 UTC+01:00	Degabriele 55'	Report		Stadium: National Stadium; Referee: César Soto Grado (Spain)

29 March Friendly	Malta	2–0	Kuwait	Ta' Qali, Malta
19:00 UTC+02:00	Satariano 29'; Teuma 33'	Report		Stadium: National Stadium; Attendance: 1,163; Referee: Thomas Owen (Wales)

1 June Friendly	Malta	0–1	Venezuela	Ta' Qali, Malta
19:00 UTC+02:00		Report	Rondón 34'	Stadium: National Stadium; Referee: Kristo Tohver (Estonia)

5 June 2022–23 UEFA Nations League	San Marino	0–2	Malta	Serravalle, San Marino
15:00		Report	Jan Busuttil 59'; Guillaumier 75'	Stadium: Stadio Olimpico de Serravalle; Attendance: 558; Referee: Aliyar Aghayev (Azerbaijan)

9 June 2022–23 UEFA Nations League	Malta	1–2	Estonia	Ta' Qali, Malta
20:45	Hein 56' (o.g.)	Report	Vassiljev 21'; Anier 90+4'	Stadium: National Stadium; Attendance: 3,422; Referee: Bobby Madden (Scotland)

12 June 2022–23 UEFA Nations League	Malta	1–0	San Marino	Ta' Qali, Malta
20:45	Z. Muscat 50'	Report		Stadium: National Stadium; Attendance: 2,646; Referee: Dennis Higler (Netherlands)

23 September 2022–23 UEFA Nations League	Estonia	2–1	Malta	Tallinn, Estonia
19:00 (UTC+3)	Sappinen 45+6' (pen.); Anier 86'	Report	Teuma 51' (pen.)	Stadium: Lilleküla Stadium; Attendance: 5,539; Referee: Daniel Siebert (Germany)

27 September Friendly	Malta	2–1	Israel	Ta' Qali, Malta
21:00 UTC+2 (22:00 UTC+3)	Satariano 84'; Apap 86'	Report	Natcho 34' (pen.)	Stadium: National Stadium; Referee: Eldorjan Hamiti (Albania)

17 November Friendly	Malta	2–2	Greece	Ta' Qali, Malta
18:00 UTC+01:00	Degabriele 55'; Teuma 67' (pen.)	Report	Bakasetas 39'; Fountas 86'	Stadium: National Stadium; Attendance: 1,830; Referee: Alain Durieux (Luxembourg)

20 November Friendly	Malta	0–1	Republic of Ireland	Ta' Qali, Malta
20:00 UTC+01:00		Report	Robinson 55'	Stadium: National Stadium; Attendance: 2,500; Referee: Chrysovalantis Theouli (Cyprus)

=== 2023 ===
23 March UEFA Euro 2024 qualifying	North Macedonia	2–1	Malta	Skopje, North Macedonia
20:45 UTC+01:00	Elmas 66'; Churlinov 72'	Report	Yankam 86'	Stadium: Philip II Arena; Attendance: 9,991; Referee: Kristo Tohver (Estonia)

26 March UEFA Euro 2024 qualifying	Malta	0–2	Italy	Ta' Qali, Malta
20:45 UTC+01:00		Report	Retegui 15'; Pessina 27'	Stadium: National Stadium; Attendance: 16,015; Referee: Georgi Kabakov (Bulgaria)

9 June Friendly	Luxembourg	0–1	Malta	Luxembourg City, Luxembourg
20:15 UTC+02:00		Report	Nwoko 64'	Stadium: Stade de Luxembourg; Attendance: 4,028; Referee: Eldorjan Hamiti (Albania)

16 June UEFA Euro 2024 qualifying	Malta	0–4	England	Ta' Qali, Malta
20:45 UTC+01:00		Report	Apap 9' (o.g.); Alexander-Arnold 28'; Kane 31' (pen.); Wilson 83' (pen.)	Stadium: National Stadium; Attendance: 16,277; Referee: Igor Pajac (Croatia)

19 June UEFA Euro 2024 qualifying	Ukraine	1–0	Malta	Trnava, Slovakia
20:45 UTC+01:00	Tsyhankov 72' (pen.)	Report		Stadium: Anton Malatinský Stadium; Attendance: 7,543; Referee: Ruddy Buquet (France)

6 September Friendly	Malta	1–0	Gibraltar	Ta' Qali, Malta
20:00 UTC+01:00	Mbong 58'	Report		Stadium: National Stadium; Attendance: 821; Referee: Miloš Bošković (Montenegro)

12 September UEFA Euro 2024 qualifying	Malta	0–2	North Macedonia	Ta' Qali, Malta
20:45 UTC+01:00		Report	Elmas 5'; Manev 41'	Stadium: National Stadium; Attendance: 3,158; Referee: Henrik Nalbandyan (Armenia)

14 October UEFA Euro 2024 qualifying	Italy	4–0	Malta	Bari, Italy
20:45 UTC+02:00	Bonaventura 23'; Berardi 45+1' 64'; Fratessi (90+3+1)	Report		Stadium: Stadio San Nicola; Attendance: 56,186; Referee: Duje Strukan (Croatia)

17 October UEFA Euro 2024 qualifying	Malta	1–3	Ukraine	Ta' Qali, Malta
20:45 UTC+02:00	Mbong 12'	Report	Camenzuli 38' (o.g.); Dovbyk 43' (pen.); Mudryk 85'	Stadium: National Stadium; Attendance: 3,547; Referee: Morten Krogh (Denmark)

17 November UEFA Euro 2024 qualifying	England	2–0	Malta	London, England
19:45 UTC±00:00	Pepe 8' (o.g.); Kane 75'	Report		Stadium: Wembley Stadium; Attendance: 81,388; Referee: Luis Godinho (Portugal)

=== 2024 ===
21 March Friendly	Malta	2–2	Slovenia	Ta' Qali, Malta
19:00 UTC+1	Guillaumier 54'; Pisani 58'	Report	Šporar 28'; Šeško 81'	Stadium: National Stadium; Attendance: 1,652; Referee: Sandi Putros (Denmark)

26 March Friendly	Malta	0–0	Belarus	Ta' Qali, Malta
19:00 UTC+1		Report		Stadium: National Stadium; Attendance: 2,129; Referee: Martin Dohál (Slovakia)

7 June Friendly	Czech Republic	7–1	Malta	Grödig, Austria
17:30 UTC+2	Barák 6' (pen.); Chytil 44', 57'; D. Jurásek 47'; Lingr 71'; M. Jurásek 85'; Černý 89'	Report	P. Mbong 59'	Stadium: Untersberg-Arena; Attendance: 250; Referee: Stefan Ebner (Austria)

11 June Friendly	Greece	2–0	Malta	Grödig, Austria
19:00 UTC+2	Bakasetas 7' (pen.); Tzolis 15'	Report		Stadium: Untersberg-Arena; Attendance: 500; Referee: Alan Kijas (Austria)

7 September 2024–25 UEFA Nations League	Moldova	2–0	Malta	Chișinău, Moldova
19:00 UTC+3	Caimacov 32'; Nicolaescu 45+4' (pen.)	Report		Stadium: Zimbru Stadium; Attendance: 6,142; Referee: Mykola Balakin (Ukraine)

10 September 2024–25 UEFA Nations League	Andorra	0–1	Malta	Andorra la Vella, Andorra
20:45 UTC+2		Report	Camenzuli 45'	Stadium: Estadi Nacional; Attendance: 812; Referee: Mohammed Al-Hakim (Sweden)

13 October 2024–25 UEFA Nations League	Malta	1–0	Moldova	Ta' Qali, Malta
18:00 UTC+2	Teuma 87' (pen.)	Report		Stadium: National Stadium; Attendance: 5,754; Referee: John Brooks (England)

14 November Friendly	Malta	2–0	Liechtenstein	Ta' Qali, Malta
19:00 UTC+1	Degabriele 51'; Büchel 54' (o.g.)	UEFA Soccerway		Stadium: National Stadium; Attendance: 1,139; Referee: Gustavo Correia (Portugal)

19 November 2024–25 UEFA Nations League	Malta	0–0	Andorra	Ta' Qali, Malta
20:45 UTC+1		Report		Stadium: National Stadium; Attendance: 3,142; Referee: Miloš Milanović (Serbia)

=== 2025 ===
21 March 2026 FIFA World Cup qualification	Malta	0–1	Finland	Ta' Qali, Malta
20:45 UTC+2		Report	Antman 38'	Stadium: National Stadium; Attendance: 5,106; Referee: Simone Sozza (Italy)

24 March 2026 FIFA World Cup qualification	Poland	2–0	Malta	Warsaw, Poland
20:45 UTC+2	Świderski 27', 51'	Report		Stadium: Stadion Narodowy; Attendance: 45,872; Referee: Morten Krogh (Denmark)

7 June 2026 FIFA World Cup qualification	Malta	0–0	Lithuania	Ta' Qali, Malta
18:00 UTC+2		Report		Stadium: National Stadium; Attendance: 2,785; Referee: Marian Barbu (Romania)

10 June 2026 FIFA World Cup qualification	Netherlands	8–0	Malta	Groningen, Netherlands
20:45 UTC+2	Depay 9' (pen.), 16'; Van Dijk 20'; Simons 61'; Malen 74', 80'; Lang 78'; Van de Ven 90+2'	Report		Stadium: Euroborg; Attendance: 21,006; Referee: Ricardo de Burgos Bengoetxea (Spain)

4 September 2026 FIFA World Cup qualification	Lithuania	1–1	Malta	Kaunas, Lithuania
21:45 UTC+3	Gineitis 90+6'	Report	Satariano 83'	Stadium: Darius and Girėnas Stadium; Attendance: 7,854; Referee: Giorgi Kruashvili (Georgia)

9 September Friendly	Malta	3–1	San Marino	Ta' Qali, Malta
21:00 UTC+2	Cardona 5'; Z.Muscat 11'; P.Mbong 34'	Report	Nanni 45+2' (pen.)	Stadium: National Stadium; Attendance: 1,644; Referee: Andrei Chivulete (Romania)

9 October 2026 FIFA World Cup qualification	Malta	0–4	Netherlands	Ta' Qali, Malta
20:45 UTC+2		Report	Gakpo 12' (pen.), 49' (pen.); Reijnders 57'; Depay 90+3'	Stadium: National Stadium; Attendance: 9,254; Referee: Duje Strukan (Croatia)

12 October Friendly	Malta	1–4	Bosnia and Herzegovina	Ta' Qali, Malta
19:00 UTC+2	P. Mbong 60' (pen.)	Report	Memić 16'; Tabaković 53'; Tahirović 84'; Omerović 86'	Stadium: National Stadium; Attendance: 1,800; Referee: Vitālijs Spasjoņņikovs (Latvia)

14 November 2026 FIFA World Cup qualification	Finland	0–1	Malta	Helsinki, Finland
19:00 UTC+2		Report	Grech 81'	Stadium: Helsinki Olympic Stadium; Attendance: 13,577; Referee: Julian Weinberger (Austria)

17 November 2026 FIFA World Cup qualification	Malta	2–3	Poland	Ta' Qali, Malta
20:45 UTC+1	Cardona 36'; Teuma 68' (pen.)	Report	Lewandowski 32'; Wszolek 59'; Zielinski 85'	Stadium: National Stadium; Attendance: 10,326; Referee: Igor Pajač (Croatia)

=== 2026 ===
26 March 2024-25 UEFA Nations League Playoff C/D	Malta	0–2	Luxembourg	Ta' Qali, Malta
18:00 UTC+1		Report	V. Thill 47'; Olesen 90+3'	Stadium: National Stadium; Attendance: 9,467; Referee: Irfan Peljto (Bosnia and Herzegovina)

31 March 2024-25 UEFA Nations League Playoff C/D	Luxembourg	3–0 (5–0 agg.)	Malta	Luxembourg City, Luxembourg
18:00 UTC+1	V. Thill 20'; Sinani 50'; Moreira 70'	Report		Stadium: Stade de Luxembourg; Attendance: 9,113; Referee: Daniel Siebert (Germany)

1 June Friendly	Slovakia	2–1	Malta	Dunajská Streda, Slovakia
18:00 UTC+2	Haraslín 9'; Galčik 90+7'	Report	J. Mbong 37'	Stadium: MOL Aréna; Attendance: 5,721; Referee: Mihály Káprály (Hungary)

5 June Friendly	Azerbaijan	0–2	Malta	Szombathely, Hungary
20:00 UTC+2		Report	J. Mbong 65'; Satariano 86'	Stadium: Haladás Sportkomplexum; Attendance: 150; Referee: Mihály Káprály (Hungary)

24 September 2026–27 UEFA Nations League	Andorra	1–2	Malta	Encamp, Andorra
20:45 UTC+2	G. López 17'	Report	Cardona 36'; Teuma 81'	Stadium: Estadi de la FAF; Attendance: 905; Referee: Joey Kooij (Netherlands)

27 September Friendly	Malta	2–0	Liechtenstein	Ta' Qali, Malta
18:30 UTC+2	Grech 37'; Zammit 63'	Report		Stadium: National Stadium; Attendance: 1,953; Referee: Daniyar Sakhi (Kazakhstan)

1 October 2026–27 UEFA Nations League	Malta	1–1	Gibraltar	Ta' Qali, Malta
20:45 UTC+2	J. Mbong 53'	Report	Scanlon 61'	Stadium: National Stadium; Attendance: 4,090; Referee: Antoni Bandić (Bosnia and Herzegovina)

4 October 2026–27 UEFA Nations League	Malta	1–0	Andorra	Ta' Qali, Malta
18:00 UTC+2	Teuma 49'	Report		Stadium: National Stadium; Attendance: 5,894; Referee: Mikkel Redder (Denmark)

12 November Friendly	Malta	1–1	Eswatini	Ta' Qali, Malta
18:30 UTC+1	Tuma 46'	Report	Mkhontfo 45'	Stadium: National Stadium; Referee: Gustavo Correia (Portugal)

16 November 2026–27 UEFA Nations League	Gibraltar	1–1	Malta	Europa Point, Gibraltar
20:45 UTC+1	C.Richards 81'	Report	Shaw 19'	Stadium: Europa Sports Park; Attendance: 1,095; Referee: Balázs Berke (Hungary)
