= 2025–26 in Maltese football =

Football in Malta
- Season: 2025–26

Men's football
- Premier League: Floriana
- Challenge League: Balzan
- Amateur League: Attard
- Amateur League II: Kalkara United
- FA Trophy: Valletta
- Challenge Cup: Birzebbuga St. Peter's
- Jubilee Cup: Valletta
- Super Cup: Hibernians

Women's football
- Women's League: Mġarr United
- Women's Knockout: Mġarr United
- Women's Jubilee Cup: Mġarr United
- Women's Super Cup: Swieqi United

The 2025–26 season is the 111th competitive football season in Malta. It runs from August 2025 to May 2026 and encompasses the top four tiers of the Maltese football league system, as well as the domestic cup competition.

== National teams ==
=== Malta men's national football team ===
==== Results and fixtures ====
===== Friendlies =====
9 September Friendly	Malta	3–1	San Marino	Ta' Qali, Malta
21:00 UTC+2	Cardona 5'; Z. Muscat 11'; P. Mbong 34'	Report	Nanni 45+2' (pen.)	Stadium: National Stadium; Referee: Andrei Chivulete (Romania)

12 October Friendly	Malta	1–4	Bosnia and Herzegovina	Ta' Qali, Malta
19:00 UTC+2	P. Mbong 60' (pen.)	Report	Memić 16'; Tabaković 53'; Tahirović 84'; Omerović 86'	Stadium: National Stadium; Referee: Vitālijs Spasjoņņikovs (Latvia)

===== 2026 FIFA World Cup qualification =====
====== Group G ======
Pos	Team	Pld	W	D	L	GF	GA	GD	Pts	Qualification	(Netherlands national football team)	(Poland national football team)	(Finland national football team)	(Malta national football team)	(Lithuania national football team)
1	Netherlands	8	6	2	0	27	4	+23	20	Qualification for 2026 FIFA World Cup	—	1–1	4–0	8–0	4–0
2	Poland	8	5	2	1	14	7	+7	17	Advance to play-offs	1–1	—	3–1	2–0	1–0
3	Finland	8	3	1	4	8	14	−6	10		0–2	2–1	—	0–1	2–1
4	Malta	8	1	2	5	4	19	−15	5		0–4	2–3	0–1	—	0–0
5	Lithuania	8	0	3	5	6	15	−9	3		2–3	0–2	2–2	1–1	—

Source: FIFA, UEFA
Rules for classification: Tiebreakers

4 September 2025 2026 FIFA World Cup qualification	Lithuania	1–1	Malta	Kaunas, Lithuania
21:45	Gineitis 90+6'	Report	Satariano 83'	Stadium: Darius and Girenas Stadium; Attendance: 7,854; Referee: Giorgi Kruashvili (Georgia)

9 October 2025 2026 World Cup qualification	Malta	0–4	Netherlands	Ta' Qali, Malta
20:45 CET (UTC+2)		Report	Gakpo 12' (pen.), 49' (pen.); Reijnders 57'; Depay 90+3'	Stadium: National Stadium; Attendance: 9,254; Referee: Duje Strukan (Croatia)

14 November 2025 2026 FIFA World Cup qualification	Finland	0–1	Malta	Helsinki, Finland
19:00 UTC+2		Report	Grech 81'	Stadium: Helsinki Olympic Stadium; Attendance: 13,577; Referee: Julian Weinberger (Austria)

17 November 2025 2026 FIFA World Cup qualification	Malta	2–3	Poland	Ta' Qali, Malta
20:45 CET (UTC+1)	Cardona 36'; Teuma 68' (pen.)	Report	Lewandowski 32'; Wszołek 59'; Zieliński 85'	Stadium: National Stadium; Attendance: 10,326; Referee: Igor Pajač (Croatia)

===== Nations League =====
====== Group D Promotion Playoff ======
26 March 2026 2024-25 Nations League Playoff C/D	Malta	0–2	Luxembourg	Ta' Qali, Malta
18:00 UTC+1		Report	V. Thill 47'; Olesen 90+3'	Stadium: National Stadium; Attendance: 9,467; Referee: Irfan Peljto (Bosnia and Herzegovina)

31 March 2026 2024-25 Nations League Playoff C/D	Luxembourg	3–0 (5–0 agg.)	Malta	Luxembourg City, Luxembourg
18:00 UTC+1	V. Thill 20'; Sinani 50'; Moreira 70'	Report		Stadium: Stade de Luxembourg; Attendance: 9,113; Referee: Daniel Siebert (Germany)

=== Malta women's national football team ===
==== Results and fixtures ====
===== Friendlies =====
25 October Friendly	Malta	0–2	Belarus	Ta' Qali, Malta
20:30		Report	Shlapakova 54'; Shuppo 90+8' (.pen)	Stadium: National Stadium, Ta' Qali

28 October Friendly	Malta	0–1	Belarus	Ta' Qali, Malta
21:00		Report	Olkhovik 39'	Stadium: National Stadium, Ta' Qali; Referee: Joanna Vassalo (Malta).

28 November 2025 Friendly	Malta	3–2	Croatia	Ta' Qali, Malta
	Cuschieri 15'; Saliba 82'; Fareugia 84'		Kurkutovic 50'; Rudelic 51'	Stadium: Centenary Stadium

1 December Friendly	Malta	0–3	Croatia	Ta' Qali, Malta
			Maja Joščak 42'; Ivana Rudelić 48'; Karla Kurkutović 76'	Stadium: Centenary Stadium

===== 2027 FIFA Women's World Cup qualification =====
====== Group B2 ======
Pos	Team	Pld	W	D	L	GF	GA	GD	Pts	Promotion, qualification or relegation	(Switzerland)	(Turkey)	(Northern Ireland)	(Malta)
1	Switzerland (P)	6	5	1	0	18	5	+13	16	Advance to play-offs and promotion to League A	—	3–1	2–0	6–1
2	Turkey	6	4	1	1	11	5	+6	13	Advance to play-offs	1–1	—	2–1	3–0
3	Northern Ireland	6	2	0	4	10	9	+1	6	Advance to play-offs	1–2	0–1	—	4–0
4	Malta (R)	6	0	0	6	4	24	−20	0	Relegation to League C	1–4	0–3	2–4	—

Source: UEFA
Rules for classification: Tiebreakers
(P) Promoted; (R) Relegated

3 March 2027 FIFA Women's World Cup qualification	Turkey	3–0	Malta	Istanbul, Turkey
15:00 (17:00 UTC+3)	L. Farrugia 7' (o.g.); Topçu 29'; Karabulut 88'	Report (FIFA); Report (UEFA)		Stadium: Pendik Stadium; Attendance: 275; Referee: Eugenia Gil Soriano (Spain)

7 March 2027 FIFA Women's World Cup qualification	Malta	1–4	Switzerland	Ta' Qali, Malta
19:00	M. Farrugia 19'	Report (FIFA); Report (UEFA)	Beney 8'; Lehmann 10'; Fölmli 39'; Schertenleib 73'	Stadium: Centenary Stadium; Attendance: 905; Referee: Jelena Medjedovic (Serbia)

14 April 2027 FIFA Women's World Cup qualification	Northern Ireland	4–0	Malta	Lurgan, Northern Ireland
20:00	Halliday 5', 52'; Andrews 17'; Maxwell 60'	Report (FIFA); Report (UEFA)		Stadium: Mourneview Park; Attendance: 821; Referee: Katarzyna Lisiecka-Sęk (Poland)

18 April 2027 FIFA Women's World Cup qualification	Malta	2–4	Northern Ireland	Ta' Qali, Malta
19:00	Farrugia 41'; Ayres 80'	Report (FIFA); Report (UEFA)	Mason 40', 51'; Johnson 69'; McFarland 72'	Stadium: Centenary Stadium; Attendance: 790; Referee: Lina Lehtovaara (Finland)

5 June 2027 FIFA Women's World Cup qualification	Switzerland	6-1	Malta	Lugano, Switzerland
18:30	Schertenleib 8'; Piubel 23'; Xhemaili 38', 81'; Csillag 40'; Reuteler 70'	Report (FIFA); Report (UEFA)	Willis 21'	Stadium: Cornaredo Stadium; Attendance: 7526; Referee: Kristina Georgieva

9 June 2027 FIFA Women's World Cup qualification	Malta	0-3	Turkey	Ta' Qali, Malta
18:00		Report (FIFA); Report (UEFA)	Gatt 8' (o.g.); Ece Türkoğlu 38'; Selen Altunkulak 52'	Stadium: Centenary Stadium; Attendance: 994; Referee: Sabina Bolic

== League competitions (Men's) ==
League Division	Promoted to league ▲	Relegated from league ▼
Premier League	Valletta ▲; Tarxien Rainbows ▲	Melita ▼; Balzan ▼
Challenge League	Birzebbuga St. Peter's ▲; Vittoriosa Stars ▲	Lija Athletic ▼; Senglea Athletic ▼
Amateur League	Mqabba ▲; Victoria Hotspurs ▲	Gharghur ▼; Marsaskala ▼; Msida Saint-Joseph ▼; Rabat Ajax ▼

=== Premier League ===
The 2025–26 Maltese Premier League, known as the YoHealth Malta Premier for sponsorship reasons, features 12 teams competing in a split-season format. The season is divided into an Opening Round and a Closing Round, each consisting of an 11-match first phase followed by a second phase split into Top Six and Play-Out groups. Hamrun Spartans entered the season as champions having won the previous three titles.

Pos	Team	Pld	W	D	L	GF	GA	GD	Pts	
1	Floriana (C)	32	21	7	4	51	27	+24	70	Qualification for the Final Four
2	Ħamrun Spartans	32	18	8	6	52	21	+31	62	Qualification for the Final Four
3	Marsaxlokk	32	16	8	8	42	36	+6	56	Qualification for the Final Four
4	Valletta	32	14	11	7	41	24	+17	53	Qualification for the Final Four and Conference League second qualifying round (Note: Valletta qualified as 2025–26 Maltese FA Trophy winners.)
5	Sliema Wanderers	32	12	12	8	37	36	+1	48	
6	Gżira United	32	12	7	13	38	43	−5	43	
7	Hibernians	32	10	9	13	45	49	−4	39	
8	Birkirkara	32	8	11	13	29	36	−7	35 (Note: Head-to-head points: Birkirkara 4, Naxxar Lions 1.)	
9	Naxxar Lions (R)	32	9	8	15	41	51	−10	35	Qualification for the Relegation play-off
10	Żabbar St. Patrick (O)	32	6	13	13	41	44	−3	31	Qualification for the Relegation play-off
11	Mosta (O)	32	6	8	18	34	58	−24	26	Qualification for the Relegation play-off
12	Tarxien Rainbows (R)	32	4	10	18	32	58	−26	22	Qualification for the Relegation play-off

Source: Malta Football Association
Rules for classification: 1) Points; 2) Head-to-head points; 3) Head-to-head goal difference; 4) Head-to-head goals scored; 5) Goal difference; 6) Goals scored; 7) Play-offs (only if needed to decide champions, teams for relegation or teams for UEFA competitions).
(C) Champions; (O) Play-off relegation winner; (R) Relegated

=== Challenge League ===
The 2025–26 Maltese Challenge League serves as the second division. The competition features 16 teams competing in a regular season followed by a split into Top Eight and Play-Out sections. The top two teams earn automatic promotion to the Premier League, with a third promotion spot available through playoffs.

Pos	Team	Pld	W	D	L	GF	GA	GD	Pts	Qualification
1	Balzan (C, P)	22	15	3	4	50	21	+29	48	Champion. Promoted to 2026-27 Malta Premier League
2	Birzebbuga St. Peter's (P)	22	14	4	4	47	27	+20	46	Promotion play-off
3	Swieqi United	22	14	4	4	48	28	+20	46	Promotion play-off
4	Melita	22	12	2	8	42	28	+14	38	
5	Sirens	22	11	2	9	50	33	+17	35	
6	Pietà Hotspurs	22	10	5	7	42	34	+8	35	
7	Fgura United	22	10	2	10	41	37	+4	32	
8	St. Andrews	22	8	3	11	26	38	−12	27	
9	Mgarr United	22	9	6	7	41	33	+8	33	
10	Gudja United	22	8	8	6	29	25	+4	32	
11	Santa Lucia	22	7	9	6	40	31	+9	30	
12	Żurrieq	22	8	3	11	36	38	−2	27	
13	Vittoriosa Stars	22	5	6	11	26	33	−7	21	
14	Żebbuġ Rangers	22	5	5	12	23	45	−22	20	
15	Marsa (R)	22	4	7	11	32	38	−6	19	Relegation to the 2026-27 National Amateur League
16	Mtarfa (R)	22	1	1	20	10	94	−84	−2 (Note: Mtarfa were deducted six points.)	Relegation to the 2026-27 National Amateur League

Updated to match(es) played on 24 April 2026. Source: Malta Football Association
Rules for classification: 1) Points; 2) Play-offs (only if needed to decide champions or teams for relegation).
(C) Champions; (P) Promoted; (R) Relegated
Notes:

23 April 2026	Swieqi United	1 - 1 (6-7 p)	Birzebbuga St. Peter's	Ta'Qali
	Barbara 10' (pen.); Attard (yellow card) 11'; Aquilina (yellow card) 42'; Fenech (yellow card) 66'; Hili (yellow card) 73'; Aguilar (yellow card) 88'	Report	Bolanos (yellow card) 7'; Zerafa 28', (yellow card) 11'; Azzopardi (yellow card) 88'; Xuereb (yellow card) 90+2'; Agius (yellow card) 102'	Stadium: Centenary Stadium
	Penalties
	Fenech (penalty missed); Aguilar (penalty scored); Leonardi (penalty scored); Augusto (penalty scored); Okle (penalty scored); Micallef (penalty scored); Agius (penalty scored); Okoh (penalty missed)		de Souza (penalty scored); Zerafa (penalty scored); Charles (penalty missed); Xuereb (penalty scored); Walker (penalty scored); Vella (penalty scored); Agius (penalty scored); Cassar (penalty scored)

=== Amateur League ===
Pos	Team	Pld	W	D	L	GF	GA	GD	Pts	Qualification
1	Attard (C, P)	26	20	3	3	73	38	+35	63	Promotion to 2026-27 Challenge League
2	Victoria Hotspurs (P)	26	17	3	6	51	24	+27	54	Promotion to 2026-27 Challenge League
3	Qormi	26	17	1	8	60	26	+34	52	
4	Lija Athletic	26	15	4	7	48	35	+13	49	
5	Mqabba	26	14	6	6	47	27	+20	48	
6	San Ġwann	26	9	6	11	29	41	−12	33	
7	Senglea Athletic	26	9	4	13	35	49	−14	31	
8	Mellieħa	26	9	3	14	25	38	−13	30	
9	Qrendi	26	8	6	12	33	48	−15	30	
10	Pembroke Athleta	26	8	4	14	34	44	−10	28	
11	Xgħajra Tornados (R)	26	7	7	12	36	48	−12	28	Relegation to 2026-27 National Amateur League II
12	Kirkop United (R)	26	5	10	11	31	38	−7	25	Relegation to 2026-27 National Amateur League II
13	Żejtun Corinthians (R)	26	6	4	16	32	49	−17	22	Relegation to 2026-27 National Amateur League II
14	Luqa St. Andrew's (R)	26	6	3	17	29	58	−29	21	Relegation to 2026-27 National Amateur League II

Updated to match(es) played on 29 April 2026. Source:
Rules for classification: 1) Points; 2) Play-offs (only if needed to decide champions, relegation, or teams for relegation play-offs).
(C) Champions; (P) Promoted; (R) Relegated

09/05/2026 16:00	Pembroke Athleta	1-0	Xgħajra Tornados	Ħamrun, Malta
	Weverton 65'	Report		Stadium: Victor Tedesco Stadium; Referee: Anthony Paul Vella (Malta)

=== Amateur League II ===
Pos	Team	Pld	W	D	L	GF	GA	GD	Pts	Qualification
1	Kalkara United (C, P)	22	17	2	3	58	16	+42	53	Promotion to 2026/27 National Amateur League I
2	Dingli Swallows (P)	22	15	4	3	45	12	+33	49	Promotion to 2026/27 National Amateur League I
3	Msida Saint-Joseph	22	14	6	2	47	19	+28	48	
4	Ta' Xbiex	22	13	4	5	38	17	+21	43	
5	Mdina Knights	22	12	5	5	45	22	+23	41	
6	Siġġiewi	22	10	2	10	34	44	−10	32	
7	St. George's	22	8	3	11	28	30	−2	27	
8	Rabat Ajax	22	8	2	12	35	48	−13	26	
9	Marsaskala	22	4	5	13	27	46	−19	17	
10	Gharghur	22	4	5	13	16	41	−25	17	
11	St. Venera Lightnings	22	3	2	17	21	58	−37	11	
12	Ghaxaq	22	3	2	17	16	57	−41	11	

Updated to match(es) played on 19 April 2026. Source:
Rules for classification: 1) Points; 2) Play-offs (only if needed to decide champions, relegation, or teams for relegation play-offs).
(C) Champions; (P) Promoted

== Cup competitions (Men's) ==
=== FA Trophy ===
==== Final ====
23 May 2026	Valletta	2–1	Gżira United	Ta' Qali
16:00	Jake Azzopardi 64'; Emmanuel Mbende 68'	Report	Andre Costa 34'	Stadium: National Stadium; Referee: Philip Farrugia

=== Challenge Cup ===
Birżebbuġa St. Peter's won the Challenge Cup after overcoming Melita in the final.

==== Final ====
3 May 2026 Challenge Cup Final	Melita	0 - 3	Birżebbuġa St. Peter's	Ta' Qali
11:00 (UTC+2)		Report	De Souza Silva 29' (pen.); Lapira 72'; Cassar 78'	Stadium: National Stadium

=== Amateur Cup ===
==== Final ====
9 May 2026 Amateur Cup Final	Qormi	v	Victoria Hotspurs	Ta' Qali
15:30 (UTC+2)		Report		Stadium: Centenary Stadium

=== Jubilee Cup ===
Valletta won the Jubilee Cup beating Sliema Wanderers in the final. The cup was held as a one off in honour of the 125th anniversary of the founding of the Malta Football Association.

==== Final ====
8 December 2025 Jubilee Cup Final	Sliema Wanderers	1 - 3	Valletta	Ta' Qali
17:30 (UTC+1)	Fernandinho 90'	Report	Messias 30', 77'; Paiber 83'	Stadium: National Stadium; Referee: Ishmael Barbara

=== Super Cup ===
Hibernians beat Hamrun Spartans after extra time after a late equaliser from Felicio Carvalho in normal time.

10 February 2026 Super Cup	Hamrun Spartans	1 - 2 (a.e.t.)	Hibernians	Ta' Qali
16:00 (UTC+1)	Marcelina 27' (pen.); Polito (yellow card) 85'; Garcia (yellow card) 98'; Bjelicic (red card) 114'	Report	Kirstensen (yellow card) 26'; Felicio Carvalho 81' (pen.); Silas (yellow card) 85'; Shaw (yellow card) 90+1'; Lima (yellow card) 104'; Halabaku 120+3'	Stadium: National Stadium

== League competitions (Women's) ==
=== Women's League ===
The 2025–26 Assikura Women's League was the top tier of women's football in Malta. The season began in August 2025 and concluded in May 2026. Six teams competed in a four-round format (each team playing 20 matches) after the league returned to six participants . The competition was sponsored by Assikura Insurance Brokers, who extended their partnership with the Malta FA for the 2025/26 season, which for the first time included prize money for the Knockout winners.

Pos	Team	Pld	W	D	L	GF	GA	GD	Pts	Qualification
1	Mgarr United	20	17	3	0	71	8	+63	54	Champions
2	Swieqi United	20	13	3	4	69	18	+51	42	
3	Hibernians	20	10	4	6	54	20	+34	34	
4	Birkirkara	20	10	2	8	50	31	+19	32	
5	San Ġwann	20	1	3	16	18	86	−68	6	
6	Valletta	20	0	3	17	15	114	−99	3	

Rules for classification: 1) Points; 2) Play-offs (only if needed to decide champions, relegation, or teams for relegation play-offs).

== Cup competitions (Women's) ==
=== Women's Super Cup ===
Swieqi United defended their Super Cup from Mgarr United by running out 3-0 winners.

7 September 2025	Swieqi United	3 - 0	Mgarr United	Ta' Qali
18:00 (UTC+1)	Abdulai 20'; Saliba 38' (pen.), 59'	Report		Stadium: Centenary Stadium; Referee: Luca Grech

=== Women's Jubilee Cup ===
Mgarr United beat Hibernians in their first trophy win on the way to winning a domestic treble, taking the Jubilee Cup, a one off competition held to mark the 125th anniversary of the Malta Football Association.

8 December 2025	Hibernians	2 - 3	Mgarr United	Ta' Qali
15:00 (UTC+1)	Sciberras 48'; Chetcuti 85'	Report	V. Villegas 39', 90'; A. Villegas 86'	Stadium: National Stadium; Referee: Jo-Anna Vassallo

=== Women's Knockout ===
Mgarr United completed their domestic treble by beating Birkirkara in a close match.

==== Final ====
1 May 2026	Mgarr United	1 - 0	Birkirkara	Ta' Qali
14:30 (UTC+2)	Carella 10'	Report		Stadium: Centenary Stadium
