= Ukraine national football team results (2020–present) =

This article provides details of international football games played by the Ukraine national football team from 2020 to present.

== Results ==
Win Draw Loss Fixture

=== 2020 ===
27 March 2020 Friendly	France	Cancelled	Ukraine

31 March 2020 Friendly	Poland	Cancelled	Ukraine

3 September 2020 Nations League	Ukraine	2–1	Switzerland	Lviv, Ukraine
21:45 UTC+3	Yarmolenko 14'; Zinchenko 68'	Report	Seferovic 41'	Stadium: Arena Lviv; Attendance: 0 (Note: Due to the COVID-19 pandemic in Europe, all matches scheduled for September 2020 were played behind closed doors.); Referee: Andreas Ekberg (Sweden)

6 September 2020 Nations League	Spain	4–0	Ukraine	Madrid, Spain
20:45 UTC+2	Ramos 3' (pen.), 29'; Fati 32'; F. Torres 84'	Report		Stadium: Alfredo Di Stéfano; Attendance: 0 Referee: Benoît Bastien (France)

7 October 2020 Friendly	France	7–1	Ukraine	Saint-Denis, France
21:10 UTC+2	Camavinga 9'; Giroud 24', 34'; Mykolenko 39' (o.g.); Tolisso 65'; Mbappé 82'; Griezmann 89'	Report	Tsyhankov 53'	Stadium: Stade de France; Attendance: 0 Referee: Andris Treimanis (Latvia)
Note: The match was originally scheduled for 27 March 2020, but postponed due to the COVID-19 pandemic in France.

10 October 2020 Nations League	Ukraine	1–2	Germany	Kyiv, Ukraine
21:45 UTC+3	Malinovskyi 77' (pen.)	Report	Ginter 20'; Goretzka 49'	Stadium: NSC Olimpiyskiy Stadium; Attendance: 17,573; Referee: Orel Grinfeld (Israel)

13 October 2020 Nations League	Ukraine	1–0	Spain	Kyiv, Ukraine
21:45 UTC+3	Tsyhankov 76'	Report		Stadium: NSC Olimpiyskiy Stadium; Attendance: 10,495; Referee: Paweł Gil (Poland)

11 November 2020 Friendly	Poland	2–0	Ukraine	Chorzów, Poland
20:45 UTC+2	Piątek 40'; Moder 63'	Report		Stadium: Silesian Stadium; Attendance: 0 Referee: Manuel Schüttengruber (Austria)
Note: The match was originally scheduled for 31 March 2020, but postponed due to the COVID-19 pandemic in Poland.

14 November 2020 Nations League	Germany	3–1	Ukraine	Leipzig, Germany
20:45 UTC+2	Sané 23'; Werner 33', 64'	Report	Yaremchuk 12'	Stadium: Red Bull Arena; Attendance: 0 Referee: Ovidiu Hațegan (Romania)

17 November 2020 Nations League	Switzerland	3–0; Awarded	Ukraine	Lucerne, Switzerland
20:45 UTC+2		Report		Stadium: Swissporarena; Referee: Anastasios Sidiropoulos (Greece)
Note: The Switzerland v Ukraine match was cancelled and awarded as a 3–0 win to Switzerland after the Ukraine national team were placed in quarantine by the local government due to positive SARS-CoV-2 tests in the squad.

=== 2021 ===
24 March 2021 2022 World Cup qualification	France	1–1	Ukraine	Saint-Denis, France
20:45 UTC+2	Griezmann 19'	Report	Kimpembe 57' (o.g.)	Stadium: Stade de France; Attendance: 0 Referee: Tobias Stieler (Germany)

28 March 2021 2022 World Cup qualification	Ukraine	1–1	Finland	Kyiv, Ukraine
21:45 UTC+3	Moraes 80'	Report	Pukki 89' (pen.)	Stadium: NSK Olimpiyskiy; Attendance: 0 Referee: István Kovács (Romania)

31 March 2021 2022 World Cup qualification	Ukraine	1–1	Kazakhstan	Kyiv, Ukraine
21:45 UTC+3	Yaremchuk 20'	Report	Muzhikov 59'	Stadium: NSK Olimpiyskiy; Attendance: 0 Referee: Matej Jug (Slovenia)

23 May 2021 Friendly	Ukraine	1–1	Bahrain	Kharkiv, Ukraine
21:00 UTC+3	Tsyhankov 90+1'	Report	Saeed 75' (pen.)	Stadium: Metalist Oblast Sports Complex; Attendance: 19,000; Referee: Pavel Orel (Czech Republic)

3 June 2021 Friendly	Ukraine	1–0	Northern Ireland	Dnipro, Ukraine
20:45 UTC+3	Zubkov 10'	Report		Stadium: Dnipro Arena; Attendance: 15,000; Referee: Szymon Marciniak (Poland)
Note: The match originally scheduled for 2 June 2020, at the NSK Olimpiyskiy, Kyiv was postponed due to the COVID-19 pandemic, and was later rescheduled to 3 June 2021.

7 June 2021 Friendly	Ukraine	4–0	Cyprus	Kharkiv, Ukraine
18:00 UTC+3	Yarmolenko 37' (pen.), 65'; Zinchenko 45+2' (pen.); Yaremchuk 59'	Report		Stadium: Metalist Oblast Sports Complex; Attendance: 18,000; Referee: Vitālijs Spasjoņņikovs (Latvia)
Note: The match originally scheduled for 26 May 2020, at the Metalist Stadium, Kharkiv was postponed due to the COVID-19 pandemic, and was later rescheduled to 7 June 2021.

13 June 2021 Euro 2020 Group C	Netherlands	3–2	Ukraine	Amsterdam, Netherlands
21:00 UTC+2	Wijnaldum 52'; Weghorst 58'; Dumfries 85'	Report	Yarmolenko 75'; Yaremchuk 79'	Stadium: Johan Cruyff Arena; Attendance: 15,837; Referee: Felix Brych (Germany)

17 June 2021 Euro 2020 Group C	Ukraine	2–1	North Macedonia	Bucharest, Romania
16:00 UTC+2	Yarmolenko 29'; Yaremchuk 34'	Report	Alioski 57'	Stadium: Arena Națională; Attendance: 10,001; Referee: Fernando Rapallini (Argentina)

21 June 2021 Euro 2020 Group C	Ukraine	0–1	Austria	Bucharest, Romania
19:00 UTC+2		Report	Baumgartner 21'	Stadium: Arena Națională; Attendance: 10,472; Referee: Cüneyt Çakır (Turkey)

29 June 2021 Euro 2020 R16	Sweden	1–2 (a.e.t.)	Ukraine	Glasgow, Scotland
20:00 UTC+1	Forsberg 43'; Danielson (red card) 99'	Report	Zinchenko 27'; Dovbyk 120+1'	Stadium: Hampden Park; Attendance: 9,221; Referee: Daniele Orsato (Italy)

3 July 2021 Euro 2020 QF	Ukraine	0–4	England	Rome, Italy
21:00 UTC+2		Report	Kane 4', 50'; Maguire 46'; J. Henderson 63'	Stadium: Stadio Olimpico; Attendance: 11,880; Referee: Felix Brych (Germany)

1 September 2021 2022 World Cup qualification	Kazakhstan	2–2	Ukraine	Nur-Sultan, Kazakhstan
20:00 UTC+6	Valiullin 74', 90+6'	Report	Yaremchuk 2'; Sikan 90+3'	Stadium: Astana Arena; Attendance: 6,274; Referee: Donatas Rumšas (Lithuania)

4 September 2021 2022 World Cup qualification	Ukraine	1–1	France	Kyiv, Ukraine
21:45 UTC+3	Shaparenko 44'	Report	Martial 51'	Stadium: NSK Olimpiyskiy; Attendance: 48,000; Referee: Slavko Vinčić (Slovenia)

8 September 2021 Friendly	Czech Republic	1–1	Ukraine	Plzeň, Czech Republic
20:45 UTC+2	Vydra 90+4'	Report	Korniyenko 27'	Stadium: Doosan Arena; Attendance: 5,231; Referee: Filip Glova (Slovakia)

9 October 2021 2022 World Cup qualification	Finland	1–2	Ukraine	Helsinki, Finland
18:00 UTC+2	Pukki 29'	Report	Yarmolenko 4'; Yaremchuk 34'	Stadium: Olympic Stadium; Attendance: 29,485; Referee: Jesús Gil Manzano (Spain)

12 October 2021 2022 World Cup qualification	Ukraine	1–1	Bosnia and Herzegovina	Lviv, Ukraine
21:45 UTC+3	Yarmolenko 15'	Report	Ahmedhodžić 77'	Stadium: Arena Lviv; Attendance: 23,810; Referee: Felix Brych (Germany)

11 November 2021 Friendly	Ukraine	1–1	Bulgaria	Odesa, Ukraine
19:30 UTC+3	Stepanenko 79'	Report	Kirilov 35'	Stadium: Chornomorets Stadium; Attendance: 10,000; Referee: Arda Kardesler (Turkey)

16 November 2021 2022 World Cup qualification	Bosnia and Herzegovina	0–2	Ukraine	Zenica, Bosnia and Herzegovina
20:45 UTC+2		Report	Zinchenko 59'; Dovbyk 79'	Stadium: Bilino Polje; Attendance: 3,370; Referee: Antonio Mateu Lahoz (Spain)

=== 2022 ===
11 May 2022 Global Tour for Peace	Borussia Mönchengladbach (Germany)	1–2	Ukraine	Mönchengladbach, Germany
20:45 UTC+2	Noß 14'	Report	Mudryk 9'; Pikhalyonok 82'	Stadium: Borussia Park; Attendance: 20,223; Referee: Denys Shurman

17 May 2022 Global Tour for Peace	Empoli (Italy)	1–3	Ukraine	Empoli, Italy
20:30 UTC+2	La Mantia 45'	Report	Yaremchuk 26'; Karavayev 46'; Pikhalyonok 53'	Stadium: Stadio Carlo Castellani; Referee: Manuel Volpi

18 May 2022 Global Tour for Peace	Rijeka (Croatia)	1–1	Ukraine	Rijeka, Croatia
18:00 UTC+2	Drmić 36'	Report	Garmash 23'	Stadium: Stadion HNK Rijeka; Referee: Ivan Bebek

1 June 2022 (Note: The match was originally scheduled for 24 March 2022, but postponed due to the Russian invasion of Ukraine.) 2022 World Cup qualification play-offs	Scotland	1–3	Ukraine	Glasgow, Scotland
19:45 UTC+1	McGregor 79'	Report	Yarmolenko 33'; Yaremchuk 49'; Dovbyk 90+5'	Stadium: Hampden Park; Attendance: 49,772; Referee: Danny Makkelie (Netherlands)

5 June 2022 2022 World Cup qualification play-offs	Wales	1–0	Ukraine	Cardiff, Wales
17:00 UTC+1	Bale 34'	Report		Stadium: Cardiff City Stadium; Attendance: 32,660; Referee: Antonio Mateu Lahoz (Spain)

8 June 2022 Nations League	Republic of Ireland	0–1	Ukraine	Dublin, Republic of Ireland
19:45 UTC+1		Report	Tsyhankov 47'	Stadium: Aviva Stadium; Attendance: 40,111; Referee: Filip Glova (Slovakia)

11 June 2022 Nations League	Ukraine	3–0	Armenia	Łódź, Poland (Note: Due to the Russian invasion of Ukraine, Ukraine are required to play their home matches at neutral venues until further notice.)
15:00 UTC+2	Malinovskyi 61'; Karavayev 77'; Mykolenko 84'	Report		Stadium: Stadion Miejski ŁKS; Attendance: 12,503; Referee: Daniel Stefański (Poland)

14 June 2022 Nations League	Ukraine	1–1	Republic of Ireland	Łódź, Poland
20:45 UTC+2	Dovbyk 47'	Report	Collins 31'	Stadium: Stadion Miejski ŁKS; Attendance: 10,641; Referee: Ali Palabıyık (Turkey)

21 September 2022 Nations League	Scotland	3–0	Ukraine	Glasgow, Scotland
19:45 UTC+1	McGinn 70'; Dykes 80', 87'	Report		Stadium: Hampden Park; Attendance: 42,846; Referee: Maurizio Mariani (Italy)

24 September 2022 Nations League	Armenia	0–5	Ukraine	Yerevan, Armenia
17:00 UTC+4		Report	Tymchyk 22'; Zubkov 57'; Dovbyk 69', 84'; Ihnatenko 81'	Stadium: Vazgen Sargsyan Republican Stadium; Attendance: 7,200; Referee: João Pinheiro (Portugal)

27 September 2022 Nations League	Ukraine	0–0	Scotland	Kraków, Poland
20:45 UTC+2		Report		Stadium: Stadion Cracovii im. Józefa Piłsudskiego; Attendance: 13,534; Referee: Anastasios Sidiropoulos (Greece)

=== 2023 ===
23 March 2023 Unofficial friendly	Brentford B (England)	0–2	Ukraine	Wimbledon, England
20:00 UTC+1		Report	Svatok 22'; Sudakov 65'	Stadium: Plough Lane; Attendance: 0

26 March 2023 UEFA Euro 2024 qualifying	England	2–0	Ukraine	London, England
17:00 UTC+1	Kane 37'; Saka 40'	Report		Stadium: Wembley Stadium; Attendance: 83,947; Referee: Serdar Gözübüyük (Netherlands)

12 June 2023 Friendly	Germany	3–3	Ukraine	Bremen, Germany
18:00 UTC+2	Füllkrug 6'; Havertz 83'; Kimmich 90+1' (pen.)	Report	Tsyhankov 19', 56'; Rüdiger 23' (o.g.)	Stadium: Weserstadion; Attendance: 35,795; Referee: Anastasios Sidiropoulos (Greece)

16 June 2023 UEFA Euro 2024 qualifying	North Macedonia	2–3	Ukraine	Skopje, North Macedonia
20:45 UTC+2	Bardhi 31' (pen.); Elmas 39'	Report	Zabarnyi 62'; Konoplya 67'; Tsyhankov 83'	Stadium: Toše Proeski Arena; Attendance: 14,370; Referee: Lukas Fähndrich (Switzerland)

19 June 2023 UEFA Euro 2024 qualifying	Ukraine	1–0	Malta	Trnava, Slovakia
18:00 UTC+2	Tsyhankov 72' (pen.)	Report		Stadium: Anton Malatinský Stadium; Attendance: 7,543; Referee: Ruddy Buquet (France)

9 September 2023 UEFA Euro 2024 qualifying	Ukraine	1–1	England	Wrocław, Poland
18:00 UTC+2	Zinchenko 26'	Report	Walker 41'	Stadium: Stadion Wrocław; Attendance: 39,000; Referee: Georgi Kabakov (Bulgaria)

12 September 2023 UEFA Euro 2024 qualifying	Italy	2–1	Ukraine	Milan, Italy
20:45 UTC+2	Frattesi 12', 29'	Report	Yarmolenko 41'	Stadium: San Siro; Attendance: 58,386; Referee: Alejandro Hernández (Spain)

14 October 2023 UEFA Euro 2024 qualifying	Ukraine	2–0	North Macedonia	Prague, Czech Republic
15:00 UTC+2	Sudakov 30'; Karavayev 90+5'	Report		Stadium: Stadion Letná; Attendance: 12,939; Referee: Slavko Vinčić (Slovenia)

17 October 2023 UEFA Euro 2024 qualifying	Malta	1–3	Ukraine	Ta' Qali, Malta
20:45 UTC+2	Mbong 12'	Report	Camenzuli 38' (o.g.); Dovbyk 43' (pen.); Mudryk 85'	Stadium: National Stadium; Attendance: 3,547; Referee: Morten Krogh (Denmark)

16 November 2023 Unofficial friendly	Lechia Gdańsk (Poland)	0–2	Ukraine	Gdańsk, Poland
16:00 UTC+1			Pikhalyonok 24'; Nazaryna 58'	Stadium: Polsat Plus Arena Gdańsk

20 November 2023 UEFA Euro 2024 qualifying	Ukraine	0–0	Italy	Leverkusen, Germany
20:45 UTC+1		Report		Stadium: BayArena; Attendance: 26,403; Referee: Jesús Gil Manzano (Spain)

=== 2024 ===
21 March 2024 UEFA Euro 2024 qualifying play-offs	Bosnia and Herzegovina	1–2	Ukraine	Zenica, Bosnia and Herzegovina
20:45	Matviyenko 56' (o.g.)	Report	Yaremchuk 85'; Dovbyk 88'	Stadium: Bilino Polje; Attendance: 10,992; Referee: Felix Zwayer (Germany)

26 March 2024 UEFA Euro 2024 qualifying play-offs	Ukraine	2–1	Iceland	Wrocław, Poland
20:45	Tsyhankov 54'; Mudryk 84'	Report	A. Guðmundsson 30'	Stadium: Stadion Wrocław; Attendance: 29,310; Referee: Clément Turpin (France)

3 June 2024 Friendly	Germany	0–0	Ukraine	Nuremberg, Germany
20:45		Report		Stadium: Max-Morlock-Stadion; Attendance: 42,789; Referee: Walter Altmann (Austria)

7 June 2024 Friendly	Poland	3–1	Ukraine	Warsaw, Poland
20:45	Walukiewicz 11'; Zieliński 16'; Romanczuk 30'	Report	Dovbyk 41'	Stadium: Stadion Narodowy; Attendance: 47,013; Referee: Andrew Madley (England)

11 June 2024 Friendly	Moldova	0–4	Ukraine	Chișinău, Moldova
17:00		Report	Yaremchuk 2'; Tsyhankov 43'; Dovbyk 49'; Sudakov 54'	Stadium: Zimbru Stadium; Attendance: 9,500; Referee: Andrei Chivulete (Romania)

17 June 2024 Euro 2024 Group E	Romania	3–0	Ukraine	Munich, Germany
15:00	Stanciu 29'; R. Marin 53'; Drăguș 57'	Report		Stadium: Allianz Arena; Attendance: 61,591; Referee: Glenn Nyberg (Sweden)

21 June 2024 Euro 2024 Group E	Slovakia	1–2	Ukraine	Düsseldorf, Germany
15:00	Schranz 17'	Report	Shaparenko 54'; Yaremchuk 80'	Stadium: Merkur Spiel-Arena; Attendance: 43,910; Referee: Michael Oliver (England)

26 June 2024 Euro 2024 Group E	Ukraine	0–0	Belgium	Stuttgart, Germany
18:00		Report		Stadium: MHPArena; Attendance: 54,000; Referee: Anthony Taylor (England)

7 September 2024 Nations League	Ukraine	1–2	Albania	Prague, Czech Republic
20:45	Konoplya 49'	Report	Ismajli 54'; Asani 66'	Stadium: Stadion Letná; Attendance: 15,500; Referee: Luís Godinho (Portugal)

10 September 2024 Nations League	Czech Republic	3–2	Ukraine	Prague, Czech Republic
20:45	Šulc 21', 45+2'; Souček 80' (pen.)	Report	Vanat 37'; Sudakov 84'	Stadium: Fortuna Arena; Attendance: 18,722; Referee: John Beaton (Scotland)

11 October 2024 Nations League	Ukraine	1–0	Georgia	Poznań, Poland
20:45	Mudryk 35'	Report		Stadium: Poznań Stadium; Attendance: 21,700; Referee: Julian Weinberger (Austria)

14 October 2024 Nations League	Ukraine	1–1	Czech Republic	Wrocław, Poland
20:45	Dovbyk 53' (pen.)	Report	Červ 18'	Stadium: Wrocław Stadium; Attendance: 14,734; Referee: Guillermo Cuadra Fernández (Spain)

16 November 2024 Nations League	Georgia	1–1	Ukraine	Batumi, Georgia
18:00	Kvirkvelia 7' (o.g.)	Report	Mikautadze 76'	Stadium: Adjarabet Arena; Attendance: 19,120; Referee: Chris Kavanagh (England)

19 November 2024 Nations League	Albania	1–2	Ukraine	Tirana, Albania
20:45	Bajrami 75' (pen.)	Report	Zinchenko 5'; Yaremchuk 7'	Stadium: Arena Kombëtare; Attendance: 20,547; Referee: João Pinheiro (Portugal)

=== 2025 ===
20 March 2025 Nations League play-offs	Ukraine	3–1	Belgium	Murcia, Spain
20:45	Hutsulyak 66'; Vanat 73'; Zabarnyi 78'	Report	Lukaku 40'	Stadium: Estadio Nueva Condomina; Attendance: 8,767; Referee: Sandro Schärer (Switzerland)

23 March 2025 Nations League play-offs	Belgium	3–0 (4–3 agg.)	Ukraine	Genk, Belgium
20:45	De Cuyper 70'; Lukaku 75', 86'	Report		Stadium: Cegeka Arena; Attendance: 19,446; Referee: Daniel Siebert (Germany)

7 June 2025 Canadian Shield Tournament	Canada	4–2	Ukraine	Toronto, Canada
15:30 UTC−4	J. David 4' 24'; P. David 31'; Buchanan 81'	Report	Zabarnyi 89'; Zinchenko 90+2' (pen.)	Stadium: BMO Field; Attendance: 20,145; Referee: Josué Ugalde (Costa Rica)

10 June 2025 Canadian Shield Tournament	New Zealand	1–2	Ukraine	Toronto, Canada
17:00 UTC−4	Stamenić 59'	Report	Hutsulyak 54'; Zinchenko 75'	Stadium: BMO Field; Attendance: 18,489; Referee: Carly Shaw-MacLaren (Canada)

5 September 2025 2026 World Cup qualification	Ukraine	0–2	France	Wrocław, Poland
20:45		Report	Olise 10'; Mbappé 82'	Stadium: Wrocław Stadium; Attendance: 38,973; Referee: Danny Makkelie (Netherlands)

9 September 2025 2026 World Cup qualification	Azerbaijan	1–1	Ukraine	Baku, Azerbaijan
18:00	Mahmudov 72' (pen.)	Report	Sudakov 51'	Stadium: Tofiq Bahramov Republican Stadium; Attendance: 8,450; Referee: Vassilis Fotias (Greece)

10 October 2025 2026 World Cup qualification	Iceland	3–5	Ukraine	Reykjavík, Iceland
20:45	Ellertsson 35'; Gunnarson 59' 75'	Report	Malinovskyi 14' 45+5'; Hutsulyak 45'; Kaliuzhnyi 85'; Ocheretko 88'	Stadium: Laugardalsvöllur; Attendance: 9,111; Referee: Sven Jablonski (Germany)

13 October 2025 2026 World Cup qualification	Ukraine	2–1	Azerbaijan	Kraków, Poland
20:45	Hutsulyak 30'; Malinovskyi 64'	Report	Mykolenko 45+3' (o.g.)	Stadium: Cracovia Stadium; Attendance: 6,995; Referee: Sebastian Gishamer (Austria)

13 November 2025 2026 World Cup qualification	France	4–0	Ukraine	Paris, France
20:45	Mbappé 55' (pen.), 83'; Olise 76'; Ekitiké 88'	Report		Stadium: Parc des Princes; Attendance: 41,055; Referee: Slavko Vinčić (Slovenia)

16 November 2025 2026 World Cup qualification	Ukraine	2–0	Iceland	Warsaw, Poland
20:45	Zubkov 83'; Hutsulyak 90+3'	Report		Stadium: Polish Army Stadium; Attendance: 20,004; Referee: Anthony Taylor (England)

=== 2026 ===
26 March 2026 2026 World Cup qualification play-offs	Ukraine	1–3	Sweden	Valencia, Spain
20:45 UTC+1	Ponomarenko 90'	Report	Gyökeres 6', 51', 73' (pen.)	Stadium: Estadio Ciutat de València; Attendance: 18,846; Referee: João Pinheiro (Portugal)

31 March 2026 Friendly	Ukraine	1–0	Albania	Valencia, Spain
20:45	Hutsulyak 46'	Report		Stadium: Estadio Ciutat de València; Attendance: 7,100; Referee: Juan Martínez Munuera (Spain)

31 May 2026 Friendly	Poland	0–2	Ukraine	Wrocław, Poland
20:45 UTC+2		Report	Yaremchuk 34'; Yarmolenko 44'	Stadium: Wrocław Stadium; Attendance: 37,904; Referee: Filip Glova (Slovakia)

7 June 2026 Friendly	Denmark	2–1 (abandoned)	Ukraine	Odense, Denmark
18:30 UTC+2	Dorgu 13'; Mæhle 36'	Report	Tsyhankov 44'	Stadium: Odense Stadium; Attendance: 12,017; Referee: Sigurd Kringstad (Norway)
Note: The match was abandoned after the 65th minute, following Denmark midfielder Christian Eriksen suffering an on-field collapse.

25 September 2026 2026-27 UEFA Nations League	Hungary	0-1	Ukraine	Budapest, Hungary
20:45 UTC+1		Report	Sikan 42' Nazarenko (red card) 90'	Stadium: Puskás Aréna; Attendance: 56,796; Referee: Jarred Gillett (England)

28 September 2026 2026-27 UEFA Nations League	Georgia	0-0	Ukraine	Tbilisi, Georgia
20:45 UTC+1		Report		Stadium: Boris Paichadze National Stadium; Attendance: 43,382; Referee: Aliyar Aghayev (Azerbaijan)

02 October 2026 2026-27 UEFA Nations League	Ukraine	0-3	Northern Ireland	Trnava, Slovakia
20:45 UTC+1	Ponomarenko 90'	Report	Brown 9' Price 61' Brown 61'	Stadium: Štadión Antona Malatinského; Attendance: 7,800; Referee: Horacio Elizondo (Belgium)

05 October 2026 2026-27 UEFA Nations League	Ukraine	1–2	Hungary	Trnava, Slovakia
20:45 UTC+1	Yaremchuk 83'	Report	Tóth 52' Csinger 85'	Stadium: Štadión Antona Malatinského; Attendance: 7,910; Referee: Igor Pajač (Croatia)

14 November 2026–27 UEFA Nations League	Northern Ireland	1–0	Ukraine	Belfast, Northern Ireland
19:45 UTC+0	Devlin 68'	Report		Stadium: Windsor Park; Referee: François Letexier (France)

17 November 2026 2026-27 UEFA Nations League	Ukraine	TBA	Georgia	Trnava, Slovakia
20:45 UTC+1		Report		Stadium: Štadión Antona Malatinského

== See also ==
- Ukraine national football team rosters
