= 2026 FIFA World Cup qualification – UEFA Group G =

Association football tournament group

The 2026 FIFA World Cup qualification UEFA Group G was one of the twelve UEFA groups in the World Cup qualification tournament to decide which teams would qualify for the 2026 FIFA World Cup final tournament in Canada, Mexico and the United States. Group G consisted of five teams: Finland, Lithuania, Malta, the Netherlands and Poland. The teams played against each other home-and-away in a round-robin format from March to November 2025. However, as the Netherlands were involved in the Nations League A quarter-finals in March, they began their qualifying campaign in June 2025.

The group winners, the Netherlands, qualified directly for the World Cup finals, while the runners-up, Poland, advanced to the second round (play-offs).

== Standings ==
Pos	Team	Pld	W	D	L	GF	GA	GD	Pts	Qualification	(Netherlands)	(Poland)	(Finland)	(Malta)	(Lithuania)
1	Netherlands	8	6	2	0	27	4	+23	20	Qualification for 2026 FIFA World Cup	—	1–1	4–0	8–0	4–0
2	Poland	8	5	2	1	14	7	+7	17	Advance to play-offs	1–1	—	3–1	2–0	1–0
3	Finland	8	3	1	4	8	14	−6	10		0–2	2–1	—	0–1	2–1
4	Malta	8	1	2	5	4	19	−15	5		0–4	2–3	0–1	—	0–0
5	Lithuania	8	0	3	5	6	15	−9	3		2–3	0–2	2–2	1–1	—

Source: FIFA, UEFA
Rules for classification: Tiebreakers

== Matches ==
The fixture list was confirmed by UEFA on 13 December 2024 following the draw. Times are CET/CEST, (Note: CET (UTC+1) for matches until 29 March and from 26 October (matchday 1–2 and 9–10), and CEST (UTC+2) for matches from 30 March to 25 October 2025 (matchday 3–8).) as listed by UEFA (local times, if different, are in parentheses).

21 March 2025
20:45

Malta	0–1	Finland
	Report (FIFA); Report (UEFA)	Antman 38'

National Stadium, Ta' Qali
Attendance: 5,106
Referee: Simone Sozza (Italy)
21 March 2025
20:45

Poland	1–0	Lithuania
Lewandowski 81'	Report (FIFA); Report (UEFA)

Stadion Narodowy, Warsaw
Attendance: 55,738
Referee: Anastasios Sidiropoulos (Greece)

24 March 2025
18:00 (19:00 UTC+2)

Lithuania	2–2	Finland
Kučys 39'; Gineitis 69'	Report (FIFA); Report (UEFA)	Kairinen 4'; Pohjanpalo 17' (pen.)

Darius and Girėnas Stadium, Kaunas
Attendance: 10,421
Referee: Erik Lambrechts (Belgium)
24 March 2025
20:45

Poland	2–0	Malta
Świderski 27', 51'	Report (FIFA); Report (UEFA)

Stadion Narodowy, Warsaw
Attendance: 45,872
Referee: Morten Krogh (Denmark)

7 June 2025
18:00

Malta	0–0	Lithuania
	Report (FIFA); Report (UEFA)

National Stadium, Ta' Qali
Attendance: 2,785
Referee: Marian Barbu (Romania)
7 June 2025
20:45 (21:45 UTC+3)

Finland	0–2	Netherlands
	Report (FIFA); Report (UEFA)	Depay 6'; Dumfries 23'

Helsinki Olympic Stadium, Helsinki
Attendance: 29,483
Referee: Daniel Siebert (Germany)

10 June 2025
20:45 (21:45 UTC+3)

Finland	2–1	Poland
Pohjanpalo 31' (pen.); Källman 64'	Report (FIFA); Report (UEFA)	Kiwior 69'

Helsinki Olympic Stadium, Helsinki
Attendance: 16,511
Referee: João Pinheiro (Portugal)
10 June 2025
20:45

Netherlands	8–0	Malta
Depay 9' (pen.), 16'; Van Dijk 20'; Simons 61'; Malen 74', 80'; Lang 78'; Van de Ven 90+2'	Report (FIFA); Report (UEFA)

Euroborg, Groningen
Attendance: 21,006
Referee: Ricardo de Burgos Bengoetxea (Spain)

4 September 2025
18:00 (19:00 UTC+3)

Lithuania	1–1	Malta
Gineitis 90+7' (pen.)	Report (FIFA); Report (UEFA)	Satariano 83'

Darius and Girėnas Stadium, Kaunas
Attendance: 7,854
Referee: Giorgi Kruashvili (Georgia)
4 September 2025
20:45

Netherlands	1–1	Poland
Dumfries 28'	Report (FIFA); Report (UEFA)	Cash 80'

De Kuip, Rotterdam
Attendance: 40,904
Referee: Simone Sozza (Italy)

7 September 2025
18:00 (19:00 UTC+3)

Lithuania	2–3	Netherlands
Gineitis 36'; Girdvainis 43'	Report (FIFA); Report (UEFA)	Depay 11', 63'; Q. Timber 33'

Darius and Girėnas Stadium, Kaunas
Attendance: 14,797
Referee: Elchin Masiyev (Azerbaijan)
7 September 2025
20:45

Poland	3–1	Finland
Cash 27'; Lewandowski 45+2'; Kamiński 54'	Report (FIFA); Report (UEFA)	Källman 88'

Silesian Stadium, Chorzów
Attendance: 50,897
Referee: Rade Obrenović (Slovenia)

9 October 2025
18:00 (19:00 UTC+3)

Finland	2–1	Lithuania
Källman 48'; Markhiyev 55'	Report (FIFA); Report (UEFA)	Širvys 25'

Helsinki Olympic Stadium, Helsinki
Attendance: 15,819
Referee: Stéphanie Frappart (France)
9 October 2025
20:45

Malta	0–4	Netherlands
	Report (FIFA); Report (UEFA)	Gakpo 12' (pen.), 49' (pen.); Reijnders 57'; Depay 90+3'

National Stadium, Ta' Qali
Attendance: 9,254
Referee: Duje Strukan (Croatia)

12 October 2025
18:00

Netherlands	4–0	Finland
Malen 8'; Van Dijk 17'; Depay 38' (pen.); Gakpo 84'	Report (FIFA); Report (UEFA)

Johan Cruyff Arena, Amsterdam
Attendance: 52,387
Referee: Slavko Vinčić (Slovenia)
12 October 2025
20:45 (21:45 UTC+3)

Lithuania	0–2	Poland
	Report (FIFA); Report (UEFA)	Szymański 15'; Lewandowski 64'

Darius and Girėnas Stadium, Kaunas
Attendance: 11,741
Referee: Ondřej Berka (Czech Republic)

14 November 2025
18:00 (19:00 UTC+2)

Finland	0–1	Malta
	Report (FIFA); Report (UEFA)	Grech 81'

Helsinki Olympic Stadium, Helsinki
Attendance: 13,577
Referee: Julian Weinberger (Austria)
14 November 2025
20:45

Poland	1–1	Netherlands
Kamiński 43'	Report (FIFA); Report (UEFA)	Depay 47'

Stadion Narodowy, Warsaw
Attendance: 56,278
Referee: Maurizio Mariani (Italy)

17 November 2025
20:45

Malta	2–3	Poland
Cardona 36'; Teuma 68' (pen.)	Report (FIFA); Report (UEFA)	Lewandowski 32'; Wszołek 59'; Zieliński 85'

National Stadium, Ta' Qali
Attendance: 10,326
Referee: Igor Pajač (Croatia)
17 November 2025
20:45

Netherlands	4–0	Lithuania
Reijnders 16'; Gakpo 58' (pen.); Simons 60'; Malen 62'	Report (FIFA); Report (UEFA)

Johan Cruyff Arena, Amsterdam
Attendance: 46,913
Referee: Luis Godinho (Portugal)

== Goalscorers ==
There were 59 goals scored in 20 matches, for an average of 2.95 goals per match.

8 goals

- (Netherlands) Memphis Depay

4 goals

- (Netherlands) Cody Gakpo
- (Netherlands) Donyell Malen
- (Poland) Robert Lewandowski

3 goals

- (Finland) Benjamin Källman
- (Lithuania) Gvidas Gineitis

2 goals

- (Finland) Joel Pohjanpalo
- (Netherlands) Denzel Dumfries
- (Netherlands) Tijjani Reijnders
- (Netherlands) Xavi Simons
- (Netherlands) Virgil van Dijk
- (Poland) Matty Cash
- (Poland) Jakub Kamiński
- (Poland) Karol Świderski

1 goal

- (Finland) Oliver Antman
- (Finland) Kaan Kairinen
- (Finland) Adam Markhiyev
- (Lithuania) Edvinas Girdvainis
- (Lithuania) Armandas Kučys
- (Lithuania) Pijus Širvys
- (Malta) Irvin Cardona
- (Malta) Jake Grech
- (Malta) Alexander Satariano
- (Malta) Teddy Teuma
- (Netherlands) Noa Lang
- (Netherlands) Quinten Timber
- (Netherlands) Micky van de Ven
- (Poland) Jakub Kiwior
- (Poland) Sebastian Szymański
- (Poland) Paweł Wszołek
- (Poland) Piotr Zieliński

== Discipline ==
A player or team official was automatically suspended for the next match for the following offences:

- Receiving a red card (red card suspensions could be extended for serious offences)
- Receiving two yellow cards in two different matches (yellow card suspensions were carried forward to the play-offs, but not the finals or any other future international matches)

The following suspensions were served during the qualifying matches:

Team	Player	Offence(s)	Suspended for match(es)
Finland	Robert Ivanov	(yellow card) vs Lithuania (24 March 2025); (yellow card) vs Lithuania (9 October 2025)	vs Netherlands (12 October 2025)
Finland	Matti Peltola	(yellow card) vs Malta (21 March 2025); (yellow card) vs Netherlands (12 October 2025)	vs Malta (14 November 2025)
Lithuania	Artemijus Tutyškinas	(yellow card) vs Malta (7 June 2025); (yellow card) vs Malta (4 September 2025)	vs Netherlands (7 September 2025)
Lithuania	Edgaras Utkus	(yellow card) (yellow-red card) vs Malta (4 September 2025)	vs Netherlands (7 September 2025) vs Finland (9 October 2025)
Lithuania	Artūr Dolžnikov	(yellow card) vs Malta (4 September 2025); (yellow card) vs Finland (9 October 2025)	vs Poland (12 October 2025)
Lithuania	Edvinas Girdvainis	(yellow card) vs Finland (24 March 2025); (yellow card) vs Poland (12 October 2025)	vs Netherlands (17 November 2025)
Malta	Gabriel Mentz	(red card) vs Andorra in 2024–25 UEFA Nations League (19 November 2024)	vs Finland (21 March 2025) vs Poland (24 March 2025) vs Lithuania (7 June 2025)
Malta	Kurt Shaw	(red card) vs Finland (21 March 2025)	vs Poland (24 March 2025) vs Lithuania (7 June 2025)
Malta	Ilyas Chouaref	(red card) vs Poland (24 March 2025)	vs Lithuania (7 June 2025) vs Netherlands (10 June 2025)
Malta	Matthew Guillaumier	(yellow card) vs Lithuania (7 June 2025); (yellow card) vs Netherlands (10 June 2025)	vs Lithuania (4 September 2025)
Malta	Zach Muscat	(yellow card) vs Poland (24 March 2025); (yellow card) vs Lithuania (4 September 2025)	vs Netherlands (9 October 2025)
Malta	Paul Mbong	(yellow card) vs Lithuania (7 June 2025); (yellow card) vs Lithuania (4 September 2025)	vs Netherlands (9 October 2025)
Malta	Jake Azzopardi	(red card) vs Lithuania (4 September 2025)	vs Netherlands (9 October 2025) vs Finland (14 November 2025)
Malta	Ryan Camenzuli	(yellow card) vs Lithuania (7 June 2025); (yellow card) vs Netherlands (9 October 2025)	vs Finland (14 November 2025)
Malta	Teddy Teuma	(yellow card) vs Netherlands (10 June 2025); (yellow card) vs Netherlands (9 October 2025)	vs Finland (14 November 2025)
Netherlands	Jan Paul van Hecke	(yellow card) vs Finland (7 June 2025); (yellow card) vs Poland (14 November 2025)	vs Lithuania (17 November 2025)
Poland	Bartosz Slisz	(yellow card) vs Malta (24 March 2025); (yellow card) vs Lithuania (12 October 2025)	vs Netherlands (14 November 2025)
Poland	Przemysław Wiśniewski	(yellow card) vs Finland (7 September 2025); (yellow card) vs Lithuania (12 October 2025)	vs Netherlands (14 November 2025)
