= 2022 FIFA World Cup qualification – UEFA Group H =

UEFA association football competition

The 2022 FIFA World Cup qualification UEFA Group H was one of the ten UEFA groups in the World Cup qualification tournament to decide which teams would qualify for the 2022 FIFA World Cup finals tournament in Qatar. Group H consisted of six teams: Croatia, Cyprus, Malta, Russia, Slovakia and Slovenia. The teams played against each other home-and-away in a round-robin format.

The group winners, Croatia, qualified directly for the World Cup finals, while the runners-up, Russia, advanced to the second round (play-offs), but they were later suspended by FIFA due to the Russian invasion of Ukraine.

== Standings ==
Pos	Team	Pld	W	D	L	GF	GA	GD	Pts	Qualification	Croatia	Russia	Slovakia	Slovenia	Cyprus	Malta
1	Croatia	10	7	2	1	21	4	+17	23	Qualification for 2022 FIFA World Cup	—	1–0	2–2	3–0	1–0	3–0
2	Russia (Note: On 28 February 2022, FIFA suspended Russia from international competitions due to the Russian invasion of Ukraine.)	10	7	1	2	19	6	+13	22	Advance to play-offs	0–0	—	1–0	2–1	6–0	2–0
3	Slovakia	10	3	5	2	17	10	+7	14		0–1	2–1	—	2–2	2–0	2–2
4	Slovenia	10	4	2	4	13	12	+1	14		1–0	1–2	1–1	—	2–1	1–0
5	Cyprus	10	1	2	7	4	21	−17	5		0–3	0–2	0–0	1–0	—	2–2
6	Malta	10	1	2	7	9	30	−21	5		1–7	1–3	0–6	0–4	3–0	—

Source: FIFA, UEFA
Rules for classification: Tiebreakers

== Matches ==
The fixture list was confirmed by UEFA on 8 December 2020, the day following the draw. Times are CET/CEST, (Note: CET (UTC+1) for matches until 27 March and from 31 October (matchday 1–2 and 9–10), and CEST (UTC+2) for matches from 28 March to 30 October 2021 (matchday 3–8).) as listed by UEFA (local times, if different, are in parentheses).

24 March 2021
20:45 (21:45 UTC+2)

Cyprus	0–0	Slovakia
	Report (FIFA); Report (UEFA)

GSP Stadium, Nicosia
Attendance: 0 (Note: Due to the COVID-19 pandemic in Europe, the match was played behind closed doors.)
Referee: Aleksandar Stavrev (North Macedonia)
24 March 2021
20:45

Malta	1–3	Russia
J. Mbong 56'	Report (FIFA); Report (UEFA)	Dzyuba 23'; Fernandes 35'; Sobolev 90'

National Stadium, Ta' Qali
Attendance: 0
Referee: Peter Kjaesgaard (Denmark)
24 March 2021
20:45

Slovenia	1–0	Croatia
Lovrić 15'	Report (FIFA); Report (UEFA)

Stadion Stožice, Ljubljana
Attendance: 0
Referee: Antonio Mateu Lahoz (Spain)

27 March 2021
15:00 (17:00 UTC+3)

Russia	2–1	Slovenia
Dzyuba 26', 35'	Report (FIFA); Report (UEFA)	Iličić 36'

Fisht Olympic Stadium, Sochi
Attendance: 13,008
Referee: Marco Di Bello (Italy)
27 March 2021
18:00

Croatia	1–0	Cyprus
Pašalić 40'	Report (FIFA); Report (UEFA)

Stadion Rujevica, Rijeka
Attendance: 0
Referee: Kristo Tohver (Estonia)
27 March 2021
20:45

Slovakia	2–2	Malta
Strelec 49'; Škriniar 53'	Report (FIFA); Report (UEFA)	Gambin 16'; Satariano 20'

Štadión Antona Malatinského, Trnava
Attendance: 0
Referee: Harald Lechner (Austria)

30 March 2021
18:00 (19:00 UTC+3)

Cyprus	1–0	Slovenia
Pittas 42'	Report (FIFA); Report (UEFA)

GSP Stadium, Nicosia
Attendance: 0
Referee: Andreas Ekberg (Sweden)
30 March 2021
20:45

Croatia	3–0	Malta
Perišić 62'; Modrić 76' (pen.); Brekalo 90'	Report (FIFA); Report (UEFA)

Stadion Rujevica, Rijeka
Attendance: 0
Referee: Lionel Tschudi (Switzerland)
30 March 2021
20:45

Slovakia	2–1	Russia
Škriniar 38'; Mak 74'	Report (FIFA); Report (UEFA)	Fernandes 71'

Štadión Antona Malatinského, Trnava
Attendance: 0
Referee: Carlos del Cerro Grande (Spain)

1 September 2021
20:45

Malta	3–0	Cyprus
Attard 44', 54'; J. Mbong 46'	Report (FIFA); Report (UEFA)

National Stadium, Ta' Qali
Attendance: 2,686
Referee: Fabio Maresca (Italy)
1 September 2021
20:45 (21:45 UTC+3)

Russia	0–0	Croatia
	Report (FIFA); Report (UEFA)

Luzhniki Stadium, Moscow
Attendance: 18,708
Referee: Roi Reinshreiber (Israel)
1 September 2021
20:45

Slovenia	1–1	Slovakia
Stojanović 42'	Report (FIFA); Report (UEFA)	Boženík 32'

Stožice Stadium, Ljubljana
Attendance: 4,034
Referee: István Kovács (Romania)

4 September 2021
18:00 (19:00 UTC+3)

Cyprus	0–2	Russia
	Report (FIFA); Report (UEFA)	Yerokhin 6'; Zhemaletdinov 55'

GSP Stadium, Nicosia
Attendance: 1,645
Referee: Alejandro Hernández Hernández (Spain)
4 September 2021
18:00

Slovenia	1–0	Malta
Lovrić 45' (pen.)	Report (FIFA); Report (UEFA)

Stožice Stadium, Ljubljana
Attendance: 4,571
Referee: Andris Treimanis (Latvia)
4 September 2021
20:45

Slovakia	0–1	Croatia
	Report (FIFA); Report (UEFA)	Brozović 86'

Tehelné pole, Bratislava
Attendance: 9,047
Referee: Bartosz Frankowski (Poland)

7 September 2021
20:45

Croatia	3–0	Slovenia
Livaja 33'; Pašalić 66'; Vlašić 90+4'	Report (FIFA); Report (UEFA)

Stadion Poljud, Split
Attendance: 16,237
Referee: Clément Turpin (France)
7 September 2021
20:45 (21:45 UTC+3)

Russia	2–0	Malta
Smolov 10'; Bakayev 84' (pen.)	Report (FIFA); Report (UEFA)

Otkritie Arena, Moscow
Attendance: 10,508
Referee: Ali Palabıyık (Turkey)
7 September 2021
20:45

Slovakia	2–0	Cyprus
Schranz 55'; Koscelník 77'	Report (FIFA); Report (UEFA)

Tehelné pole, Bratislava
Attendance: 6,762
Referee: Aliyar Aghayev (Azerbaijan)

8 October 2021
20:45 (21:45 UTC+3)

Cyprus	0–3	Croatia
	Report (FIFA); Report (UEFA)	Perišić 45+2'; Gvardiol 80'; Livaja 90+2'

AEK Arena – Georgios Karapatakis, Larnaca
Attendance: 2,333
Referee: Michael Oliver (England)
8 October 2021
20:45

Malta	0–4	Slovenia
	Report (FIFA); Report (UEFA)	Iličić 27', 60'; Šporar 49'; Šeško 67'

National Stadium, Ta' Qali
Attendance: 3,967
Referee: Anastasios Sidiropoulos (Greece)
8 October 2021
20:45 (21:45 UTC+3)

Russia	1–0	Slovakia
Škriniar 24' (o.g.)	Report (FIFA); Report (UEFA)

Ak Bars Arena, Kazan
Attendance: 9,588
Referee: Antonio Mateu Lahoz (Spain)

11 October 2021
18:00 (19:00 UTC+3)

Cyprus	2–2	Malta
Papoulis 7'; Sotiriou 80'	Report (FIFA); Report (UEFA)	Z. Muscat 53'; Degabriele 90+8'

AEK Arena – Georgios Karapatakis, Larnaca
Attendance: 1,405
Referee: Dennis Higler (Netherlands)
11 October 2021
20:45

Croatia	2–2	Slovakia
Kramarić 25'; Modrić 71'	Report (FIFA); Report (UEFA)	Schranz 20'; Haraslín 45'

Gradski Vrt Stadium, Osijek
Attendance: 9,926
Referee: Ovidiu Hațegan (Romania)
11 October 2021
20:45

Slovenia	1–2	Russia
Iličić 40'	Report (FIFA); Report (UEFA)	Diveyev 28'; Dzhikiya 32'

Ljudski vrt, Maribor
Attendance: 6,524
Referee: Artur Soares Dias (Portugal)

11 November 2021
18:00 (20:00 UTC+3)

Russia	6–0	Cyprus
Yerokhin 4', 87'; Smolov 55'; Mostovoy 56'; Sutormin 62'; Zabolotny 82'	Report (FIFA); Report (UEFA)

Krestovsky Stadium, Saint Petersburg
Attendance: 10,108
Referee: Daniel Stefański (Poland)
11 November 2021
20:45

Malta	1–7	Croatia
Brozović 31' (o.g.)	Report (FIFA); Report (UEFA)	Perišić 6'; Ćaleta-Car 22'; Pašalić 39'; Modrić 45+1'; Majer 47', 64'; Kramarić 53'

National Stadium, Ta' Qali
Attendance: 4,581
Referee: Deniz Aytekin (Germany)
11 November 2021
20:45

Slovakia	2–2	Slovenia
Duda 58' (pen.); Strelec 74'	Report (FIFA); Report (UEFA)	Zajc 18'; Mevlja 62'

Anton Malatinský Stadium, Trnava
Attendance: 2,726
Referee: Mattias Gestranius (Finland)

14 November 2021
15:00

Croatia	1–0	Russia
Kudryashov 81' (o.g.)	Report (FIFA); Report (UEFA)

Stadion Poljud, Split
Attendance: 30,257
Referee: Danny Makkelie (Netherlands)
14 November 2021
15:00

Malta	0–6	Slovakia
	Report (FIFA); Report (UEFA)	Rusnák 6', 16'; Duda 8', 69', 80'; De Marco 72'

National Stadium, Ta' Qali
Attendance: 3,293
Referee: Fran Jović (Croatia)
14 November 2021
15:00

Slovenia	2–1	Cyprus
Zajc 48'; Gnezda Čerin 84'	Report (FIFA); Report (UEFA)	Kakoullis 89'

Stožice Stadium, Ljubljana
Attendance: 5,117
Referee: Sergey Ivanov (Russia)

== Goalscorers ==
There were 83 goals scored in 30 matches, for an average of 2.77 goals per match.

4 goals

- (Slovakia national football team) Ondrej Duda
- (Slovenia national football team) Josip Iličić

3 goals

- (Croatia national football team) Luka Modrić
- (Croatia national football team) Mario Pašalić
- (Croatia national football team) Ivan Perišić
- (Russia national football team) Artem Dzyuba
- (Russia national football team) Aleksandr Yerokhin

2 goals

- (Croatia national football team) Andrej Kramarić
- (Croatia national football team) Marko Livaja
- (Croatia national football team) Lovro Majer
- (Malta national football team) Cain Attard
- (Malta national football team) Joseph Mbong
- (Russia national football team) Mário Fernandes
- (Russia national football team) Fyodor Smolov
- (Slovakia national football team) Albert Rusnák
- (Slovakia national football team) Ivan Schranz
- (Slovakia national football team) Milan Škriniar
- (Slovakia national football team) David Strelec
- (Slovenia national football team) Sandi Lovrić
- (Slovenia national football team) Miha Zajc

1 goal

- (Croatia national football team) Josip Brekalo
- (Croatia national football team) Marcelo Brozović
- (Croatia national football team) Duje Ćaleta-Car
- (Croatia national football team) Joško Gvardiol
- (Croatia national football team) Nikola Vlašić
- (Cyprus national football team) Andronikos Kakoullis
- (Cyprus national football team) Fotis Papoulis
- (Cyprus national football team) Ioannis Pittas
- (Cyprus national football team) Pieros Sotiriou
- (Malta national football team) Jurgen Degabriele
- (Malta national football team) Luke Gambin
- (Malta national football team) Zach Muscat
- (Malta national football team) Alexander Satariano
- (Russia national football team) Zelimkhan Bakayev
- (Russia national football team) Igor Diveyev
- (Russia national football team) Georgi Dzhikiya
- (Russia national football team) Andrei Mostovoy
- (Russia national football team) Aleksandr Sobolev
- (Russia national football team) Aleksei Sutormin
- (Russia national football team) Anton Zabolotny
- (Russia national football team) Rifat Zhemaletdinov
- (Slovakia national football team) Róbert Boženík
- (Slovakia national football team) Vernon De Marco
- (Slovakia national football team) Lukáš Haraslín
- (Slovakia national football team) Martin Koscelník
- (Slovakia national football team) Róbert Mak
- (Slovenia national football team) Adam Gnezda Čerin
- (Slovenia national football team) Miha Mevlja
- (Slovenia national football team) Benjamin Šeško
- (Slovenia national football team) Andraž Šporar
- (Slovenia national football team) Petar Stojanović

1 own goal

- (Croatia national football team) Marcelo Brozović (against Malta)
- (Russia national football team) Fyodor Kudryashov (against Croatia)
- (Slovakia national football team) Milan Škriniar (against Russia)

== Discipline ==
A player was automatically suspended for the next match for the following offences:

- Receiving a red card (red card suspensions could be extended for serious offences)
- Receiving two yellow cards in two different matches (yellow card suspensions were carried forward to the play-offs, but not the finals or any other future international matches)

The following suspensions were served during the qualifying matches:

Team	Player	Offence(s)	Suspended for match(es)
Croatia	Borna Barišić	(yellow card) vs Slovenia (24 March 2021); (yellow card) vs Slovakia (11 October 2021)	vs Malta (11 November 2021)
Croatia	Mateo Kovačić	(yellow card) vs Cyprus (27 March 2021); (yellow card) vs Cyprus (8 October 2021)	vs Slovakia (11 October 2021)
Croatia	Marko Rog	(yellow card) (yellow-red card) vs Portugal in 2020–21 UEFA Nations League (17 November 2020)	vs Slovenia (24 March 2021)
Croatia	Domagoj Vida	(yellow card) vs Slovenia (24 March 2021); (yellow card) vs Malta (30 March 2021)	vs Russia (1 September 2021)
Cyprus	Kostakis Artymatas	(yellow card) vs Russia (4 September 2021); (yellow card) vs Croatia (8 October 2021)	vs Malta (11 October 2021)
Cyprus	Andreas Avraam	(yellow card) vs Slovakia (7 September 2021); (yellow card) vs Croatia (8 October 2021)	vs Malta (11 October 2021)
Cyprus	Constantinos Soteriou	(yellow card) (yellow-red card) vs Malta (1 September 2021)	vs Russia (4 September 2021)
Malta	Ryan Camenzuli	(yellow card) vs Slovakia (27 March 2021); (yellow card) vs Russia (7 September 2021)	vs Slovenia (8 October 2021)
Malta	Joseph Mbong	(yellow card) vs Cyprus (1 September 2021); (yellow card) vs Slovenia (8 October 2021)	vs Cyprus (11 October 2021)
Malta	Enrico Pepe	(yellow card) vs Slovenia (4 September 2021); (yellow card) vs Croatia (11 November 2021)	vs Slovakia (14 November 2021)
Malta	Alexander Satariano	(yellow card) vs Slovenia (4 September 2021); (yellow card) vs Slovenia (8 October 2021)	vs Cyprus (11 October 2021)
Russia	Aleksei Miranchuk	(yellow card) vs Slovenia (27 March 2021); (yellow card) vs Malta (7 September 2021)	vs Slovakia (8 October 2021)
Russia	Rifat Zhemaletdinov	(yellow card) vs Malta (24 March 2021); (yellow card) vs Slovakia (30 March 2021)	vs Croatia (1 September 2021)
Slovakia	Dávid Hancko	(yellow card) vs Cyprus (7 September 2021); (yellow card) vs Croatia (11 October 2021)	vs Slovenia (11 November 2021)
Slovakia	Juraj Kucka	(yellow card) vs Russia (8 October 2021); (yellow card) vs Croatia (11 October 2021)	vs Slovenia (11 November 2021)
Slovakia	Peter Pekarík	(yellow card) vs Croatia (4 September 2021); (yellow card) vs Slovenia (11 November 2021)	vs Malta (14 November 2021)
Slovakia	Ivan Schranz	(yellow card) vs Slovenia (1 September 2021); (yellow card) vs Croatia (11 October 2021)	vs Slovenia (11 November 2021)
Slovenia	Jaka Bijol	(yellow card) vs Croatia (7 September 2021); (yellow card) vs Russia (11 October 2021)	vs Slovakia (11 November 2021)
Slovenia	Miha Blažič	(yellow card) (yellow-red card) vs Slovakia (11 November 2021)	vs Cyprus (14 November 2021)
Slovenia	Adam Gnezda Čerin	(yellow card) vs Slovakia (1 September 2021); (yellow card) vs Russia (11 October 2021)	vs Slovakia (11 November 2021)
Slovenia	Josip Iličić	(yellow card) vs Cyprus (30 March 2021); (yellow card) vs Slovakia (1 September 2021)	vs Malta (4 September 2021)
Slovenia	Jasmin Kurtić	(yellow card) vs Croatia (24 March 2021); (yellow card) vs Cyprus (30 March 2021)	vs Slovakia (1 September 2021)
Slovenia	Jasmin Kurtić	(yellow card) vs Malta (4 September 2021); (yellow card) vs Russia (11 October 2021)	vs Slovakia (11 November 2021)
Slovenia	Miha Mevlja	(yellow card) vs Croatia (24 March 2021); (yellow card) vs Russia (27 March 2021)	vs Cyprus (30 March 2021)
