= UEFA Euro 2024 qualifying Group C =

Group C of UEFA Euro 2024 qualifying was one of the ten groups to decide which teams would qualify for the UEFA Euro 2024 final tournament in Germany. Group C consisted of five teams: England, Italy, Malta, North Macedonia, and Ukraine. The teams played against each other home-and-away in a round-robin format. The group saw England and Italy meet again, having faced each other in the UEFA Euro 2020 final.

The top two teams, England and Italy, qualified directly for the final tournament. The participants of the qualifying play-offs were decided based on their performance in the 2022–23 UEFA Nations League.

== Standings ==
Pos	Team	Pld	W	D	L	GF	GA	GD	Pts	Qualification	(England)	(Italy)	(Ukraine)	(North Macedonia)	(Malta)
1	England	8	6	2	0	22	4	+18	20	Qualify for final tournament	—	3–1	2–0	7–0	2–0
2	Italy	8	4	2	2	16	9	+7	14 (Note: Head-to-head points: Italy 4, Ukraine 1.)	Qualify for final tournament	1–2	—	2–1	5–2	4–0
3	Ukraine	8	4	2	2	11	8	+3	14	Advance to play-offs via Nations League	1–1	0–0	—	2–0	1–0
4	North Macedonia	8	2	2	4	10	20	−10	8		1–1	1–1	2–3	—	2–1
5	Malta	8	0	0	8	2	20	−18	0		0–4	0–2	1–3	0–2	—

Source: UEFA
Rules for classification: Qualification tiebreakers

== Matches ==
The fixture list was confirmed by UEFA on 10 October 2022, the day after the draw. Times are CET/CEST, (Note: CET (UTC+1) for matches until 25 March and from 29 October (matchday 1 and 9–10), and CEST (UTC+2) for matches from 26 March to 28 October 2023 (matchday 2–8).) as listed by UEFA (local times, if different, are in parentheses).

23 March 2023
20:45

Italy	1–2	England
Retegui 56'	Report	Rice 13'; Kane 44' (pen.)

Stadio Diego Armando Maradona, Naples
Attendance: 44,536
Referee: Srđan Jovanović (Serbia)
23 March 2023
20:45

North Macedonia	2–1	Malta
Elmas 66'; Churlinov 72'	Report	Yankam 85'

Toše Proeski Arena, Skopje
Attendance: 9,991
Referee: Kristo Tohver (Estonia)

26 March 2023
18:00 (17:00 UTC+1)

England	2–0	Ukraine
Kane 37'; Saka 40'	Report

Wembley Stadium, London
Attendance: 83,947
Referee: Serdar Gözübüyük (Netherlands)
26 March 2023
20:45

Malta	0–2	Italy
	Report	Retegui 15'; Pessina 27'

National Stadium, Ta' Qali
Attendance: 16,015
Referee: Georgi Kabakov (Bulgaria)

16 June 2023
20:45

Malta	0–4	England
	Report	Apap 8' (o.g.); Alexander-Arnold 28'; Kane 31' (pen.); Wilson 83' (pen.)

National Stadium, Ta' Qali
Attendance: 16,277
Referee: Igor Pajac (Croatia)
16 June 2023
20:45

North Macedonia	2–3	Ukraine
Bardhi 31' (pen.); Elmas 39'	Report	Zabarnyi 62'; Konoplya 67'; Tsyhankov 83'

Toše Proeski Arena, Skopje
Attendance: 14,370
Referee: Lukas Fähndrich (Switzerland)

19 June 2023
18:00 (19:00 UTC+3)

Ukraine	1–0	Malta
Tsyhankov 72' (pen.)	Report

Anton Malatinský Stadium, Trnava (Slovakia) (Note: Due to the Russian invasion of Ukraine, Ukraine were required to play their home matches at neutral venues until further notice.)
Attendance: 7,543
Referee: Ruddy Buquet (France)
19 June 2023
20:45 (19:45 UTC+1)

England	7–0	North Macedonia
Kane 29', 73' (pen.); Saka 38', 47', 51'; Rashford 45'; Phillips 64'	Report

Old Trafford, Manchester
Attendance: 70,708
Referee: István Kovács (Romania)

9 September 2023
18:00

Ukraine	1–1	England
Zinchenko 26'	Report	Walker 41'

Wrocław Stadium, Wrocław (Poland)
Attendance: 39,000
Referee: Georgi Kabakov (Bulgaria)
9 September 2023
20:45

North Macedonia	1–1	Italy
Bardhi 81'	Report	Immobile 47'

Toše Proeski Arena, Skopje
Attendance: 28,126
Referee: François Letexier (France)

12 September 2023
20:45

Italy	2–1	Ukraine
Frattesi 12', 29'	Report	Yarmolenko 41'

San Siro, Milan
Attendance: 58,386
Referee: Alejandro Hernández Hernández (Spain)
12 September 2023
20:45

Malta	0–2	North Macedonia
	Report	Elmas 5'; Manev 41'

National Stadium, Ta' Qali
Attendance: 3,158
Referee: Henrik Nalbandyan (Armenia)

14 October 2023
15:00

Ukraine	2–0	North Macedonia
Sudakov 30'; Karavayev 90+5'	Report

Stadion Letná, Prague (Czech Republic)
Attendance: 12,939
Referee: Slavko Vinčić (Slovenia)
14 October 2023
20:45

Italy	4–0	Malta
Bonaventura 23'; Berardi 45+1', 64'; Frattesi 90+3'	Report

Stadio San Nicola, Bari
Attendance: 56,186
Referee: Duje Strukan (Croatia)

17 October 2023
20:45 (19:45 UTC+1)

England	3–1	Italy
Kane 32' (pen.), 77'; Rashford 57'	Report	Scamacca 15'

Wembley Stadium, London
Attendance: 83,194
Referee: Clément Turpin (France)
17 October 2023
20:45

Malta	1–3	Ukraine
Mbong 12'	Report	Camenzuli 38' (o.g.); Dovbyk 43' (pen.); Mudryk 85'

National Stadium, Ta' Qali
Attendance: 3,547
Referee: Morten Krogh (Denmark)

17 November 2023
20:45 (19:45 UTC±0)

England	2–0	Malta
Pepe 8' (o.g.); Kane 75'	Report

Wembley Stadium, London
Attendance: 81,388
Referee: Luis Godinho (Portugal)
17 November 2023
20:45

Italy	5–2	North Macedonia
Darmian 17'; Chiesa 41', 45+2'; Raspadori 81'; El Shaarawy 90+3'	Report	Atanasov 52', 74'

Stadio Olimpico, Rome
Attendance: 56,364
Referee: Felix Zwayer (Germany)

20 November 2023
20:45

North Macedonia	1–1	England
Bardhi 41'	Report	Atanasov 59' (o.g.)

Toše Proeski Arena, Skopje
Attendance: 27,982
Referee: Filip Glova (Slovakia)
20 November 2023
20:45

Ukraine	0–0	Italy
	Report

BayArena, Leverkusen (Germany)
Attendance: 26,403
Referee: Jesús Gil Manzano (Spain)

== Goalscorers ==
There were 61 goals scored in 20 matches, for an average of 3.05 goals per match.

8 goals

- (England national football team) Harry Kane

4 goals

- (England national football team) Bukayo Saka

3 goals

- (Italy national football team) Davide Frattesi
- (North Macedonia national football team) Enis Bardhi
- (North Macedonia national football team) Elif Elmas

2 goals

- (England national football team) Marcus Rashford
- (Italy national football team) Domenico Berardi
- (Italy national football team) Federico Chiesa
- (Italy national football team) Mateo Retegui
- (North Macedonia national football team) Jani Atanasov
- (Ukraine national football team) Viktor Tsyhankov

1 goal

- (England national football team) Trent Alexander-Arnold
- (England national football team) Kalvin Phillips
- (England national football team) Declan Rice
- (England national football team) Kyle Walker
- (England national football team) Callum Wilson
- (Italy national football team) Giacomo Bonaventura
- (Italy national football team) Matteo Darmian
- (Italy national football team) Stephan El Shaarawy
- (Italy national football team) Ciro Immobile
- (Italy national football team) Matteo Pessina
- (Italy national football team) Giacomo Raspadori
- (Italy national football team) Gianluca Scamacca
- (Malta national football team) Paul Mbong
- (Malta national football team) Yannick Yankam
- (North Macedonia national football team) Darko Churlinov
- (North Macedonia national football team) Jovan Manev
- (Ukraine national football team) Artem Dovbyk
- (Ukraine national football team) Oleksandr Karavayev
- (Ukraine national football team) Yukhym Konoplya
- (Ukraine national football team) Mykhailo Mudryk
- (Ukraine national football team) Heorhiy Sudakov
- (Ukraine national football team) Andriy Yarmolenko
- (Ukraine national football team) Illya Zabarnyi
- (Ukraine national football team) Oleksandr Zinchenko

1 own goal

- (Malta national football team) Ferdinando Apap (against England)
- (Malta national football team) Ryan Camenzuli (against Ukraine)
- (Malta national football team) Enrico Pepe (against England)
- (North Macedonia national football team) Jani Atanasov (against England)

== Discipline ==
A player was automatically suspended for the next match for the following offences:

- Receiving a red card (red card suspensions could be extended for serious offences)
- Receiving three yellow cards in three different matches, as well as after fifth and any subsequent yellow card (yellow card suspensions could be carried forward to the play-offs, but not the finals or any other future international matches)

The following suspensions were served during the qualifying matches:

Team	Player	Offence(s)	Suspended for match(es)
England	Luke Shaw	(yellow card) (yellow-red card) vs Italy (23 March 2023)	vs Ukraine (26 March 2023)
Italy	Giovanni Di Lorenzo	(yellow card) vs England (23 March 2023); (yellow card) vs Malta (26 March 2023); (yellow card) vs England (17 October 2023)	vs North Macedonia (17 November 2023)
Malta	Jean Borg	(red card) vs Estonia in 2022–23 UEFA Nations League (23 September 2022)	vs North Macedonia (23 March 2023)
Malta	Steve Borg	(yellow card) vs North Macedonia (23 March 2023); (yellow card) vs Ukraine (19 June 2023); (yellow card) vs North Macedonia (12 September 2023)	vs Italy (14 October 2023)
North Macedonia	Todor Todoroski	(red card) vs Bulgaria in 2022–23 UEFA Nations League (26 September 2022)	vs Malta (23 March 2023)
North Macedonia	Visar Musliu	(yellow card) (yellow-red card) vs Ukraine (16 June 2023)	vs England (19 June 2023)
Ukraine	Ruslan Malinovskyi	(yellow card) vs England (26 March 2023); (yellow card) vs Malta (19 June 2023); (yellow card) vs North Macedonia (14 October 2023)	vs Malta (17 October 2023)
