= Gvidas Gineitis =

Lithuanian footballer (born 2004)

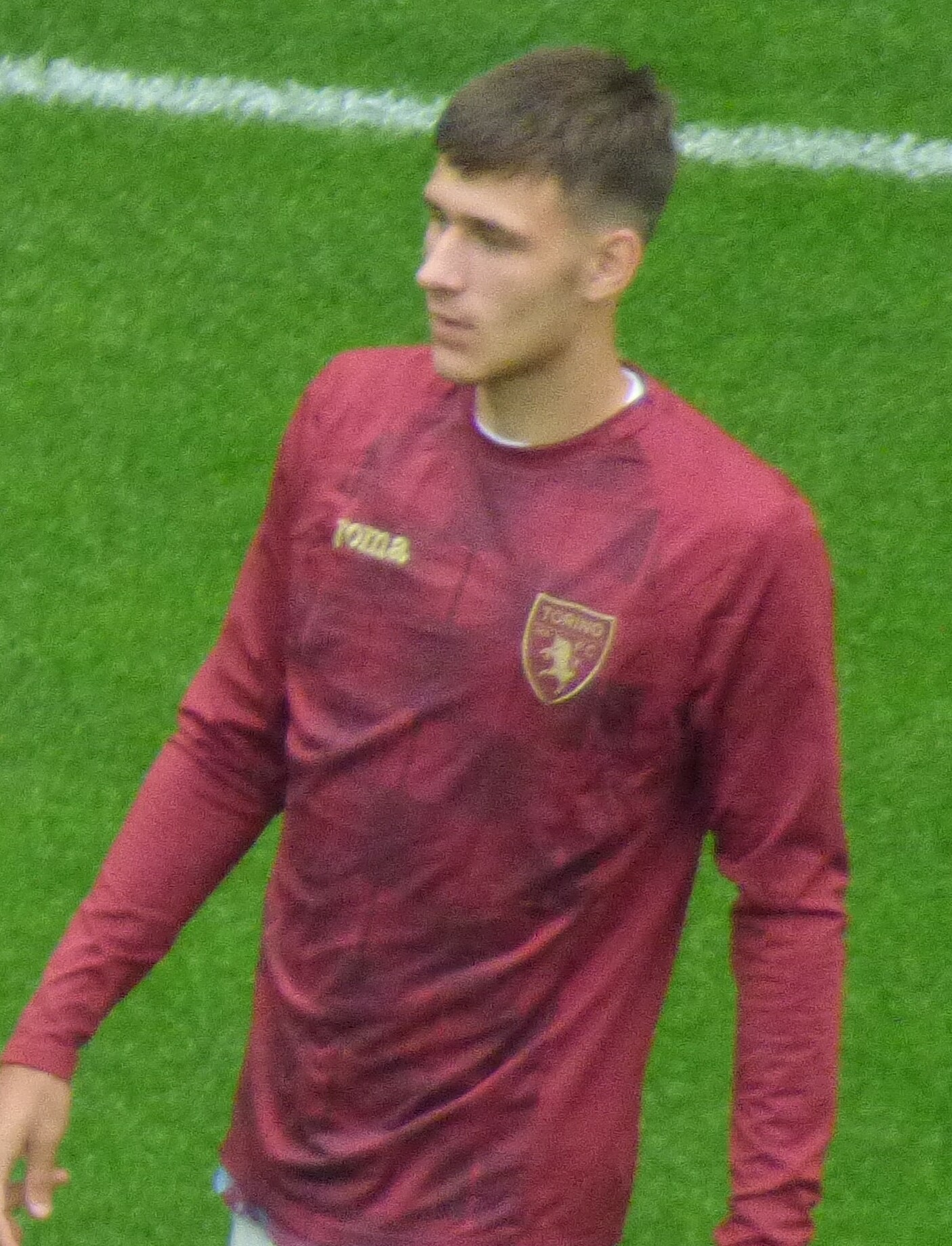
- Gineitis with Torino in 2023

Personal information
- Date of birth: 15 April 2004 (age 22)
- Place of birth: Mažeikiai, Lithuania
- Height: 1.91 m (6 ft 3 in)
- Position: Midfielder

Team information
- Current team: Torino
- Number: 66

Youth career
- 2016–2018: NFA Kaunas

Senior career*
Years	Team	Apps	(Gls)
2018–2019	NFA Kaunas	10	(0)
2019–2020	Atmosfera	28	(4)
2020–2022	SPAL	0	(0)
2022–	Torino	80	(3)

International career^{‡}
2021–2022	Lithuania U17	3	(0)
2021–2022	Lithuania U19	8	(1)
2022–2025	Lithuania U21	3	(0)
2022–	Lithuania	37	(5)
- * Club domestic league appearances and goals as of 25 September 2026 ‡ National team caps and goals as of 18 November 2026 (UTC)

Gvidas Gineitis (born 15 April 2004) is a Lithuanian professional footballer who plays as a midfielder for Serie A club Torino and the Lithuania national team.

In January 2023, he received the Best Young Lithuanian Footballer of the Year award by the Lithuanian Football Federation.

== Club career ==
Born in Mažeikiai, Gineitis is a youth product of NFA Kaunas, where he made his senior debut on 22 September 2018, coming on as a substitute in the second half of a 2–1 I Lyga defeat to Žalgiris B.

In 2019, he then joined fellow second-tier side Atmosfera, where he scored his first senior goal on 24 April 2019, in a 9–8 LFF Cup loss on penalties against Kėdainiai (the match had ended in a 3–3 draw after 120 minutes).

In the summer of 2020, Gineitis joined Serie B side SPAL, where he played for the under-17, under-18 and under-19 teams of the Italian club.

On 31 January 2022, the deadline day for the winter transfer window, Gineitis joined Serie A side Torino on a permanent transfer, as part of a deal that also involved Demba Seck and Francesco Dell'Aquila. He subsequently signed a professional contract with the club on 8 June 2022, penning a three-year deal.

Following his performances for Torino's under-19 squad, the midfielder was promoted to the first team during the winter break of the 2022–23 season, under head coach Ivan Jurić. He went on to make his Serie A debut on 10 February 2023, starting and playing 45 minutes in a 1–0 loss to AC Milan. In the occasion, he became the fourth Lithuanian player to ever feature in the Italian top tier, following the likes of Tomas Danilevičius, Marius Stankevičius and Edgaras Dubickas.

In March 2023, Gineitis extended his contract with Torino until 2026.

== International career ==
Gineitis has represented Lithuania at various youth international levels, having played for the under-17, under-19 and under-21 national teams.

In November 2022, he received his first call-up to the Lithuanian senior national team for the 2022 Baltic Cup. He then made his senior debut for Lithuania on 16 November 2022, coming in as a substitute in the tournament's semi-final match against Iceland, which ended up in a 5–6 loss on penalties. Three days later, he made his first start in the third place final against Estonia, which ended in a 2–0 loss.

On 15 November 2024, during a 2024–25 UEFA Nations League C game against Cyprus, he scored his first goal for Lithuania, becoming at 20 years and 7 months its youngest goalscorer in UEFA Nations League.

== Career statistics ==
=== International ===
Scores and results list Lithuania's goal tally first.

List of international goals scored by Gvidas Gineitis
No.	Date	Venue	Opponent	Score	Result	Competition
1.	15 November 2024	AEK Arena – Georgios Karapatakis, Larnaca, Cyprus	Cyprus	1–1	1–2	2024–25 UEFA Nations League C
2.	24 March 2025	Darius and Girenas Stadium, Kaunas, Lithuania	Finland	2–2	2–2	2026 FIFA World Cup qualification
3.	4 September 2025	Darius and Girenas Stadium, Kaunas, Lithuania	Malta	1–1	1–1	2026 FIFA World Cup qualification
4.	7 September 2025	Darius and Girenas Stadium, Kaunas, Lithuania	Netherlands	1–2	2–3	2026 FIFA World Cup qualification
5.	26 March 2026	Stadionul Zimbru, Chișinău, Moldova	Moldova	2–0	2–0	Friendly

== Style of play ==
Gineitis is a left-footed midfielder, who mainly acts as a mezzala on attacking duties, but can also play in every position of the midfield, or even in the number 10 role. He has been mainly regarded for his physique, his athleticism and his off-the-ball movement.

Due to his characteristics, he has been compared to Tommaso Pobega.
