= Tomás Moreira =

Luxembourgish footballer (born 2005)

Personal information
- Full name: João Tomás de Sousa Moreira Cruz
- Date of birth: 26 June 2005 (age 21)
- Place of birth: Porto, Portugal
- Height: 1.78 m (5 ft 10 in)
- Position: Midfielder

Team information
- Current team: Bodrumspor
- Number: 6

Youth career
- –2015: Porto
- 2015–2021: Norden 02
- 2021–2024: Hannover 96
- 2024–2026: Benfica

Senior career*
Years	Team	Apps	(Gls)
2024–2026	Benfica B	30	(0)
2026–	Bodrumspor	6	(0)

International career^{‡}
2024–	Luxembourg	22	(1)
- * Club domestic league appearances and goals as of 17 October 2026 ‡ National team caps and goals as of 16 November 2026

João Tomás de Sousa Moreira Cruz (born 26 June 2005) is a footballer who plays as a midfielder for Turkish TFF 1. Lig club Bodrumspor. Born in Portugal, he is a Luxembourg international.

== Club career ==
As a youth player, Moreira joined the youth academy of Portuguese side Porto. In 2015, he joined the youth academy of Luxembourgish side Norden 02. Six years later, he joined the youth academy of German side Hannover 96, before joining the youth academy of Portuguese side Benfica, where he started his senior career with the club's reserve team.

== International career ==
On 15 October 2024, he debuted for the Luxembourg national football team during a 1–1 away draw with the Belarus national football team in the UEFA Nations League. The day before, he obtained Luxembourgish citizenship. He was born in Porto, Portugal to Portuguese parents and moved to Luxembourg with his family at the age of ten.

== International goals ==
Scores and results list Luxembourg's goal tally first, score column indicates score after each Moreira goal.

List of international goals scored by Tomás Moreira
No	Date	Venue	Opponent	Score	Result	Competition
1.	31 March 2026	Stade de Luxembourg, Luxembourg City, Luxembourg	Malta	3–0	3–0	2024–25 UEFA Nations League promotion/relegation play-offs
