= Ferdinando Apap =

Maltese footballer

Personal information
- Date of birth: 29 July 1992 (age 34)
- Position: Defender

Team information
- Current team: Victoria Hotspurs

Senior career*
Years	Team	Apps	(Gls)
2010–2012	Għajnsielem		
2012	Sheffield		
2012–2013	Mosta	23	(3)
2013–2014	Xewkija Tigers		
2014–2015	Victoria Hotspurs		
2015–2017	Għajnsielem		
2017–2019	Victoria Hotspurs		
2019–2024	Hibernians	111	(14)
2024–	Victoria Hotspurs		

International career^{‡}
2018–2023	Malta	18	(1)
2010–	Gozo		
- * Club domestic league appearances and goals as of 13:28, 22 June 2024 (UTC) ‡ National team caps and goals as of 14 October 2023

Ferdinando Apap (born 29 July 1992) is a Maltese footballer who plays for Victoria Hotspurs as a defender.

== Club career ==
Apap has played club football for Għajnsielem, Sheffield, Mosta, Xewkija Tigers and Victoria Hotspurs.

He was the Gozo Football Association Player of the Year for the 2013–14 and 2018–19 seasons.

On 1 June 2019, he joined Hibernians on a three-year deal. He returned to Victoria Hotspurs in June 2024.

== International career ==
He made his international debut for Malta in August 2018. He retired from the national team in June 2024 following his decision to rejoin Victoria Hotspurs.

He has also played unofficial matches for the Gozo representative team, making his debut in 2010.

=== International goals ===
Scores and results list Malta's goal tally first.

No.	Date	Venue	Opponent	Score	Result	Competition
1.	27 September 2022	Ta' Qali National Stadium, Ta' Qali, Malta	Israel	2–1	2–1	Friendly

== Personal life ==
His sister was married to Daniel Bogdanović, also a footballer.
