= Jan Busuttil =

Maltese footballer

Personal information
- Full name: Jan Busuttil
- Date of birth: 6 March 1999 (age 27)
- Place of birth: Malta
- Position: Midfielder

Team information
- Current team: Birkirkara
- Number: 22

Youth career
- –2018: Pietà Hotspurs

Senior career*
| Years | Team | Apps | (Gls) |
| 2016–2019 | Pietà Hotspurs | 66 | (10) |
| 2019–2024 | Floriana | 88 | (13) |
| 2024–2025 | Balzan | 43 | (4) |
| 2025– | Birkirkara | 23 | (1) |

International career^{‡}
| 2015 | Malta U17 | 3 | (0) |
| 2017 | Malta U19 | 2 | (0) |
| 2018–2020 | Malta U21 | 13 | (0) |
| 2020– | Malta | 4 | (1) |
- * Club domestic league appearances and goals as of 18 May 2026 ‡ National team caps and goals as of 01:10, 10 June 2023 (UTC)

Jan Busuttil (born 6 March 1999) is a Maltese professional footballer who plays as a midfielder for Birkirkara and the Malta national team.

== Career ==
Busuttil made his international debut for Malta on 11 November 2020 in a friendly 3–0 win against Liechtenstein.

== Career statistics ==
=== International ===
As of 11 November 2020

Malta
| Year | Apps | Goals |
|---|---|---|
| 2020 | 1 | 0 |
| Total | 1 | 0 |

== International goals ==
Scores and results list Malta's goal tally first.

| No. | Date | Venue | Opponent | Score | Result | Competition |
|---|---|---|---|---|---|---|
| 1. | 5 June 2022 | San Marino Stadium, Serravalle, San Marino | San Marino | 1–0 | 2–0 | 2022–23 UEFA Nations League |
