= Alexander Satariano =

Maltese footballer (born 2001)

Personal information
- Date of birth: 25 October 2001 (age 25)
- Place of birth: St. Julian's, Malta
- Height: 1.84 m (6 ft 0 in)
- Position: Forward

Team information
- Current team: Athens Kallithea
- Number: 23

Youth career
- St. Andrews

Senior career*
Years	Team	Apps	(Gls)
2016–2019	St. Andrews	26	(1)
2019–2020	→ Sliema Wanderers (loan)	15	(2)
2020–2021	Sliema Wanderers	16	(6)
2021–2023	Frosinone	2	(0)
2022	→ Pergolettese (loan)	1	(0)
2022–2023	→ Balzan (loan)	24	(2)
2023–2025	Birkirkara	54	(4)
2025–	Athens Kallithea	21	(2)

International career^{‡}
2016–2017	Malta U17	5	(1)
2017–2019	Malta U19	9	(2)
2020	Malta U21	3	(0)
2020–	Malta	51	(5)
- * Club domestic league appearances and goals as of 21 April 2026 ‡ National team caps and goals as of 20:00, 12 November 2026 (UTC)

Alexander Satariano (born 25 October 2001) is a Maltese professional footballer who plays as a forward for Greek Super League 2 club Athens Kallithea and the Malta national team.

== Club career ==
On 3 July 2021, he signed a three-year contract with Italian Serie B club Frosinone. On 31 January 2022, he was loaned to Pergolettese. On 31 August 2022, Satariano was loaned by the Maltese club Balzan. In August 2025 Alex Satariano Joined Athens Kallithea F.C. For the Sum Believed To be €45,000 From His Former Club Birkirkara Fc.

== International career ==
Satariano made his international debut for Malta on 11 November 2020 in a friendly match against Liechtenstein. He scored his first goal with the senior national team during a 2–2 World Cup Qualifying draw vs Slovakia.

== Career statistics ==
=== International ===
As of 12 November 2026

Malta
Year	Apps	Goals
2020	3	0
2021	11	1
2022	9	2
2023	6	0
2024	4	0
2025	10	1
2026	8	1
Total	51	5

== International goals ==
No.	Date	Venue	Opponent	Score	Result	Competition
1.	27 March 2021	Štadión Antona Malatinského, Trnava, Slovakia	Slovakia	2–0	2–2	2022 FIFA World Cup qualification
2.	29 March 2022	National Stadium, Ta'Qali, Malta	Kuwait	1–0	2–0	Friendly
3.	27 September 2022	National Stadium, Ta'Qali, Malta	Israel	1–1	2–1	Friendly
4.	4 September 2025	Darius and Girėnas Stadium, Kaunas, Lithuania	Lithuania	1–0	1–1	2026 FIFA World Cup qualification
5.	5 June 2026	Haladás Sportkomplexum, Szombathely, Hungary	Azerbaijan	2–0	2–0	Friendly
