= Jake Grech =

Maltese footballer

Personal information
- Full name: Jake Grech
- Date of birth: 18 November 1997 (age 28)
- Place of birth: Pietà, Malta
- Position: Midfielder

Team information
- Current team: Floriana
- Number: 8

Youth career
- –2013: Hamrun Spartans

Senior career*
Years	Team	Apps	(Gls)
2013–2017	Hamrun Spartans	32	(12)
2017–2019	Birkirkara	46	(16)
2019–2023	Hibernians	105	(46)
2023–2024	Balzan	12	(1)
2024-	Floriana	72	(15)

International career^{‡}
	Malta U17	5	(1)
	Malta U19	5	(1)
	Malta U21	1	(0)
2018–	Malta	30	(2)
- * Club domestic league appearances and goals as of 17 May 2026 ‡ National team caps and goals as of 18:14, 27 September 2026 (UTC)

Jake Grech (born 18 November 1997) is a Maltese professional footballer currently playing with Floriana in the Maltese Premier League.

== Club career ==
=== Ħamrun Spartans ===
Jake Grech rose through the ranks of Ħamrun Spartans, and debuted with the team in the Maltese First Division. Grech was a protagonist in Ħamrun Spartans' return from all the way down the Maltese Second Division and re-establishment of the Spartans in the Maltese Premier League. Grech was a regular goalscorer and assistman for the Spartans.

=== Birkirkara ===
Grech's displays led to interest growing in him over the months. In June 2017, Grech was transferred to Birkirkara F.C. for a record fee of €120,000. Part of Grech's deal saw defender Daniel Zerafa move to Ħamrun. Grech officially signed for Birkirkara on 18 June 2017.

=== Balzan ===
On 21 June 2023, Grech signed a contract with Balzan.

=== Floriana ===
On 26th January, 2024, Grech left Balzan and signed a contract with Floriana, having been swapped with Jan Busuttil, who signed for Balzan.

== International career ==
Grech has represented Malta in various youth categories, such as the Malta national under-17 football team, the Malta national under-19 football team and the Malta national under-21 football team. He was instrumental in various matches and showed great promise, at times being decisive for his side.

Upon being promoted as National Team manager, Ray Farrugia decided call up Jake Grech to the senior squad, amongst other players. In fact, Grech's first match with the Malta national football team was against Armenia in a match that ended in a draw.

== Style of play ==
During the team's spell in the lower divisions, Grech received a lot of playing time which helped him develop into a goal-scoring offensive-minded midfielder.

== Personal life ==
Jake is the son of former Ħamrun Spartans star Marco Grech. Jake's brother Luke Grech is also a professional footballer, who also came up through Ħamrun Spartans's youth set up.
