= Enrico Pepe =

Maltese footballer (born 1989)

Personal information
- Date of birth: 12 November 1989 (age 37)
- Place of birth: Vico Equense, Italy
- Height: 1.76 m (5 ft 9 in)
- Position: Centre-back

Team information
- Current team: Marsaxlokk
- Number: 5

Youth career
- –2007: Campobasso

Senior career*
Years	Team	Apps	(Gls)
2007–2008	Campobasso	14	(0)
2008–2011	Salernitana	16	(0)
2009	→ Cassino (loan)	13	(0)
2011	→ Siracusa (loan)	6	(0)
2011–2012	Siena	0	(0)
2011–2012	→ Paganese (loan)	27	(1)
2012–2014	Paganese	31	(0)
2014–2015	Messina	38	(0)
2015–2018	Floriana	78	(1)
2018–2019	Ħamrun Spartans	26	(0)
2019–2024	Birkirkara	96	(2)
2024–2025	Gżira United	21	(0)
2025–	Marsaxlokk	26	(0)

International career^{‡}
2020–	Malta	45	(0)
- * Club domestic league appearances and goals as of 7 May 2026 ‡ National team caps and goals as of 19:50, 18 November 2026 (UTC)

Enrico Pepe (born 12 November 1989) is a footballer who plays as a centre-back for Marsaxlokk. Born in Italy, he plays for the Malta national team.

== Club career ==
Pepe began his club career at Campobasso, during which he spent loan spells at Salernitana and Siracusa. In 2011, he moved to Siena and was subsequently loaned to Paganese, with the latter exercising their right to sign him permanently at the end of the season. He joined Messina in 2014, before moving to Malta to play for Floriana in 2015. He played for Ħamrun Spartans during the 2018–19 season, and joined Birkirkara in 2019.

== International career ==
Pepe was awarded Maltese citizenship on sporting merit in August 2020, and was therefore eligible to appear for the Malta national team. He made his international debut on 6 September 2020 in the UEFA Nations League in a 1–1 draw against Latvia.

== Honours ==
Floriana F.C.

- Maltese FA Trophy: 2016-17

Birkirkara F.C.

- Maltese FA Trophy: 2022-23

== Career statistics ==
=== International ===
As of 6 September 2020

Malta
Year	Apps	Goals
2020	1	0
Total	1	0
