= Paul Mbong =

Maltese footballer (born 2001)

Personal information
- Date of birth: 2 September 2001 (age 25)
- Place of birth: Marsaskala, Malta
- Height: 1.75 m (5 ft 9 in)
- Position: Right winger

Team information
- Current team: Floriana
- Number: 8

Youth career
- Hibernians
- Birkirkara

Senior career*
Years	Team	Apps	(Gls)
2019–2025	Birkirkara	135	(13)
2025–2026	Čukarički	5	(0)
2026	→ Floriana (loan)	12	(1)
2026–	Floriana	0	(0)

International career^{‡}
2017	Malta U17	3	(0)
2018–2019	Malta U19	9	(1)
2019–2022	Malta U21	4	(0)
2020–	Malta	47	(4)
- * Club domestic league appearances and goals as of 7 May 2026 ‡ National team caps and goals as of 19:50, 18 November 2026 (UTC)

Paul Mbong (born 2 September 2001) is a Maltese professional footballer who plays as a right winger for Floriana and the Malta national team.

== Club career ==
Mbong started his youth career with Hibernians, before joining Birkirkara in 2016. He made his senior team debut on 8 March 2019 in a 2–0 league win against Tarxien Rainbows. He scored his first goal on 16 February 2020 in a 4–1 league win against Valletta.

== International career ==
Mbong made his senior team debut on 3 September 2020 in a 3–2 UEFA Nations League defeat against Faroe Islands.

== Personal life ==
Mbong is of Nigerian descent. His father Essien Mbong was also a footballer and spent most of his career with Hibernians. He is the younger brother of fellow Maltese international Joseph Mbong and Siggiewi F.C forward Emmanuel Mbong.

== Career statistics ==
=== International ===
As of match played 16 November 2026

Appearances and goals by national team and year
National team	Year	Apps	Goals
Malta	2020	4	0
Malta	2021	8	0
Malta	2022	2	0
Malta	2023	6	1
Malta	2024	10	1
Malta	2025	7	2
Malta	2026	10	0
Total		47	4

Scores and results list Malta's goal tally first, score column indicates score after each Mbong goal.

List of international goals scored by Paul Mbong
No.	Date	Venue	Opponent	Score	Result	Competition
1	17 October 2023	National Stadium, Ta' Qali, Malta	Ukraine	1–0	1–3	UEFA Euro 2024 qualification
2	7 June 2024	Untersberg-Arena, Grödig, Austria	Czech Republic	1–4	1–7	Friendly
3	9 September 2025	National Stadium, Ta' Qali, Malta	San Marino	3–0	3–1	Friendly
4	12 October 2025	National Stadium, Ta' Qali, Malta	Bosnia and Herzegovina	1–2	1–4	Friendly

== Honours ==
Birkirkara

- Maltese FA Trophy: 2022–23
