= Zach Muscat =

Maltese footballer (born 1993)

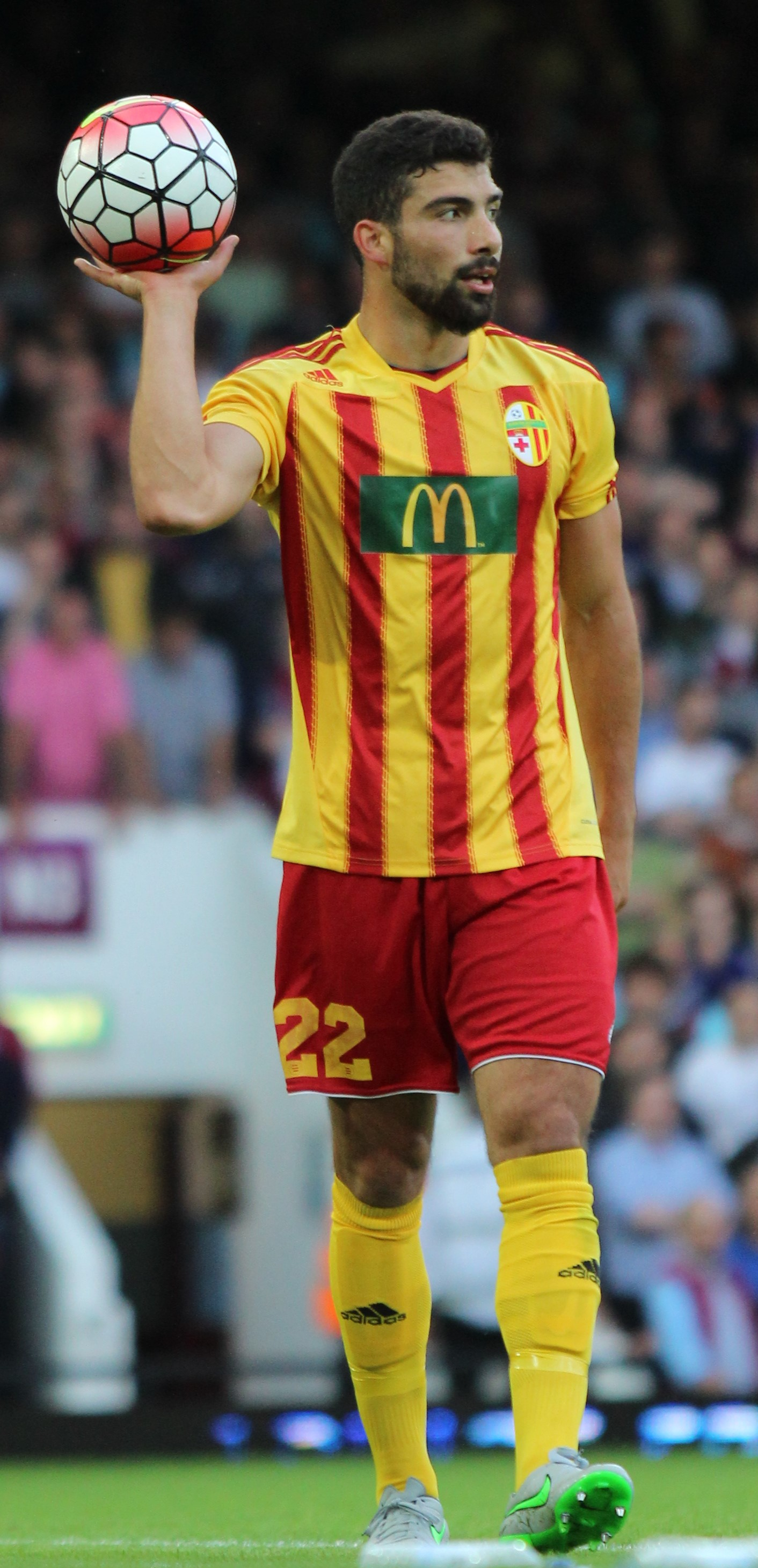
- Muscat with Birkirkara in 2015

Personal information
- Date of birth: 22 August 1993 (age 33)
- Place of birth: St Julian's, Malta
- Height: 1.84 m (6 ft 1/2 in)
- Position: Right back

Team information
- Current team: Birkirkara
- Number: 22

Senior career*
Years	Team	Apps	(Gls)
2010–2012	Pietà Hotspurs		
2012–2016	Birkirkara	100	(8)
2016	Akragas	17	(0)
2016–2018	Arezzo	45	(0)
2018–2019	Pistoiese	17	(0)
2019	→ Olhanense (loan)	12	(0)
2019–2020	Olhanense	15	(0)
2020–2022	Casa Pia	56	(7)
2022–2024	Farense	43	(5)
2025	Şanlıurfaspor	15	(1)
2025–2026	Chaves	20	(0)
2026–	Birkirkara	5	(1)

International career^{‡}
2014–	Malta	87	(4)
- * Club domestic league appearances and goals as of 12 September 2026 ‡ National team caps and goals as of 20:00, 12 November 2026 (UTC)

Zach Muscat (born 22 August 1993) is a Maltese professional footballer who plays as a right back for Birkirkara and the Malta national team.

== Club career ==
Muscat has played club football for Pietà Hotspurs, Birkirkara and Akragas. He moved to Arezzo in June 2016.

On 28 June 2018, Muscat signed a two-year contract with Pistoiese. On 31 January 2019, he moved to Portuguese club Olhanense on loan until the end of the season. He played just one game for Pistoiese in the 2019–20 season after returning from loan before on 1 September 2019 his contract was dissolved by mutual consent, and he returned to Olhanense on a permanent basis, before signing for Casa Pia.

He signed for Farense in August 2022.

After leaving Farense at the end of the 2023–24 season, Muscat signed for Turkish club Şanlıurfaspor in January 2025, making his debut later that month.

In July 2025, he joined Chaves. In July 2026 he returned to Birkirkara.

== International career ==
He made his international debut for Malta on 4 September 2014 against Slovakia, and scored his first goal on 6 June 2017, the winner in a 1–0 win against Ukraine.

== Career statistics ==
=== International ===
As of match played 12 November 2026

Appearances and goals by national team and year
National team	Year	Apps	Goals
Malta	2014	5	0
Malta	2015	7	0
Malta	2016	7	0
Malta	2017	7	1
Malta	2018	4	0
Malta	2019	10	0
Malta	2020	3	0
Malta	2021	7	1
Malta	2022	6	1
Malta	2023	7	0
Malta	2024	7	0
Malta	2025	8	1
Malta	2026	9	0
Total		87	4

As of match played 12 November 2026
Malta score listed first, score column indicates score after each Muscat goal

List of international goals scored by Zach Muscat
No.	Date	Venue	Cap	Opponent	Score	Result	Competition
1	6 June 2017	Liebenauer Stadium, Graz, Austria	21	Ukraine	1–0	1–0	Friendly
2	11 October 2021	AEK Arena – Georgios Karapatakis, Larnaca, Cyprus	49	Cyprus	1–1	2–2	2022 FIFA World Cup qualification
3	12 June 2022	National Stadium, Ta' Qali, Malta	56	San Marino	1–0	1–0	2022–23 UEFA Nations League League D
4	9 September 2025	National Stadium, Ta' Qali, Malta	75	San Marino	2–0	3–1	Friendly
