= Ryan Camenzuli =

Maltese footballer

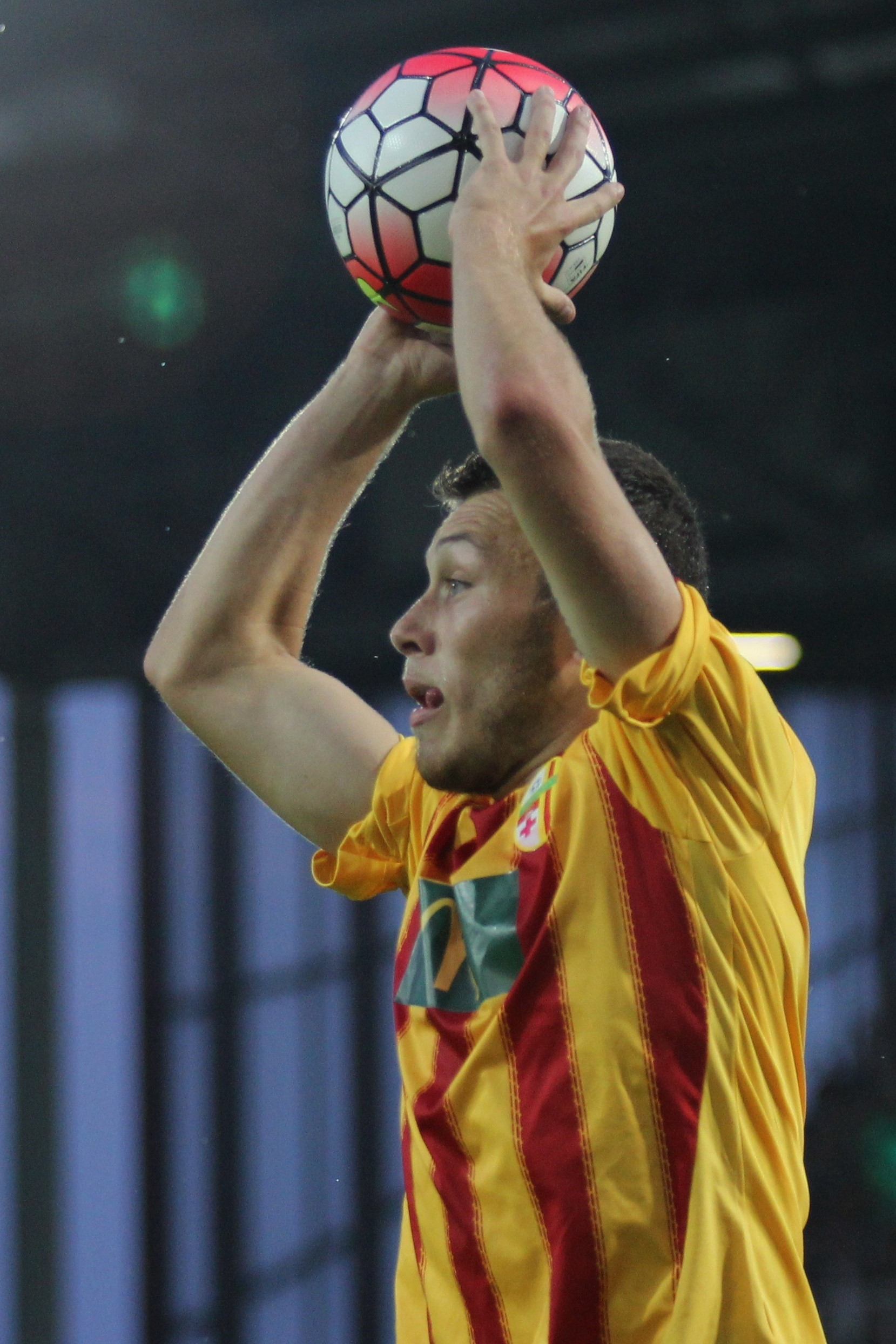
- Camenzuli playing for Birkirkara in 2015

Personal information
- Full name: Ryan Camenzuli
- Date of birth: 8 September 1994 (age 32)
- Place of birth: Malta
- Height: 1.73 m (5 ft 8 in)
- Position: Midfielder

Team information
- Current team: Hamrun Spartans
- Number: 94

Youth career
- 2001–2011: Birkirkara

Senior career*
Years	Team	Apps	(Gls)
2011–2019	Birkirkara	141	(21)
2016–2017	→ Floriana (loan)	29	(4)
2019–2022	Floriana	65	(5)
2022-	Hamrun Spartans	102	(2)

International career^{‡}
2011–2014	Malta U19	4	(0)
2012–2016	Malta U21	20	(2)
2015–	Malta	59	(1)
- * Club domestic league appearances and goals as of 7 May 2026 ‡ National team caps and goals as of 19:50, 18 November 2026 (UTC)

Ryan Camenzuli (born 8 September 1994) is a Maltese footballer who plays as a midfielder for Ħamrun Spartans and the Malta national football team.

== Club career ==
Camenzuli made his debut for Birkirkara on 30 January 2011, replacing Terence Vella in added time at the end of a 1–0 away win over Vittoriosa Stars. On 6 May, in his only other game of the season, he started in a 0–3 loss at Floriana, making way for Carl Pulo after 57 minutes.

On 28 April 2012, he scored the first goal of his career, finishing off a 2–0 home win over Hibernians. The following season, he contributed three goals in 25 games as Birkirkara won the league.

Camenzuli scored twice and was named man of the match in Birkirkara's 4–2 home win over Sliema Wanderers on 7 March 2015.

He signed with Birkirkara again in the summer 2017. He was sold back to Floriana, which was confirmed on 15 January 2019.

== International career ==
He made his debut for the Malta national football team on 25 March 2015, replacing Steve Borg in added time at the end of a 0–3 friendly defeat to Georgia at the Mikheil Meskhi Stadium in Tbilisi.

== Career statistics ==
=== Club ===
As of match played 7 November 2024

Appearances and goals by club, season and competition
Club	Season	League			FA Trophy		Continental		Super Cup		Total	
Club	Season	Division	Apps	Goals	Apps	Goals	Apps	Goals	Apps	Goals	Apps	Goals
Birkirkara	2010-11	Maltese Premier League	2	0	0	0	0	0	0	0	2	0
Birkirkara	2011-12	Maltese Premier League	16	1	0	0	1 (Note: Appearance(s) in UEFA Europa League)	0	—		17	1
Birkirkara	2012-13	Maltese Premier League	25	3	1	1	2	0	—		28	4
Birkirkara	2013-14	Maltese Premier League	27	3	2	2	2 (Note: Appearance(s) in UEFA Champions League)	0	1	0	32	5
Birkirkara	2014-15	Maltese Premier League	30	5	4	0	2	1	1	0	37	6
Birkirkara	2015-16	Maltese Premier League	28	9	3	1	4	0	1	0	36	10
Birkirkara	2016-17	Maltese Premier League	0	0	0	0	3	0	—		3	0
Birkirkara	2017-18	Maltese Premier League	13	0	0	0	—		—		13	0
Birkirkara	Total		141	21	10	4	14	1	3	0	168	26
Floriana (loan)	2016-17	Maltese Premier League	29	4	4	1	—		—		33	5
Floriana	2019-20	Maltese Premier League	18	1	2	0	—		—		20	1
Floriana	2020-21	Maltese Premier League	22	1	1	0	3 (Note: One appearance in UEFA Champions League, Two appearances in UEFA Europa League)	0	—		26	1
Floriana	2021-22	Maltese Premier League	25	3	5	0	—		—		30	3
Floriana	Total		65	5	8	0	3	0	—		76	5
Ħamrun Spartans	2022-23	Maltese Premier League	26	1	3	0	8 (Note: Appearance(s) in UEFA Europa Conference League)	1	—		37	2
Ħamrun Spartans	2023-24	Maltese Premier League	24	1	3	0	6 (Note: Two appearances in UEFA Champions League, Four appearances in UEFA Europa Conference League)	0	1	0	34	1
Ħamrun Spartans	2024-25	Maltese Premier League	10	0	0	0	2	0	0	0	12	0
Ħamrun Spartans	Total		60	2	6	0	16	1	1	0	83	3
Career total			295	32	28	5	33	2	4	0	360	39

=== International ===
As of match played 13 October 2024

Appearances and goals by national team and year
National team	Year	Apps	Goals
Malta	2015	2	0
Malta	2016	2	0
Malta	2020	7	0
Malta	2021	11	0
Malta	2022	9	0
Malta	2023	8	0
Malta	2024	5	1
Total		44	1

Scores and results list Malta's goal tally first, score column indicates score after each Camenzuli goal.

List of international goals scored by Ryan Camenzuli
No.	Date	Venue	Opponent	Score	Result	Competition	Ref.
1	10 September 2024	Estadi Nacional, Andorra la Vella, Andorra	Andorra	1–0	1–0	2024–25 UEFA Nations League D	

== Honours ==
Birkirkara

- Maltese Premier League: 2012–13
- Maltese Super Cup: 2014, 2015

Floriana

- Maltese Premier League: 2019–20

Ħamrun

- Maltese Premier League: 2022–23, 2023–24
- Maltese Super Cup: 2023
