= 2017–18 Maltese Premier League =

Maltese Premier League
- Season: 2017–18
- Dates: 18 August 2017 – 22 April 2018
- Champions: Valletta (24th title)
- Relegated: Naxxar Lions; Lija Athletic
- Champions League: Valletta
- Europa League: Balzan; Gżira United; Birkirkara
- Matches: 182
- Goals: 505 (2.77 per match)
- Top goalscorer: Amadou Samb (21 goals)
- All statistics correct as of 21 April 2018.

The 2017–18 Maltese Premier League (known as the BOV Premier League for sponsorship reasons) was the 103rd season of top-flight league football in Malta. The season began on 18 August 2017 and ended on 22 April 2018. Hibernians were the defending champions, having won their 12th title the previous season.

Balzan and Valletta contended the league title for the whole season and were head-to-head in the final phases. On the last day of the season, on 21 April 2018, Valletta defeated Gżira United 2–1, while Balzan slipped in a 0–1 defeat against Hibernians, and as a result Valletta were crowned champions for the 24th time in their history.

== Teams ==
Locations of the 2017–18 Maltese Premier League teams

Pembroke Athleta are relegated after they finished twelfth the previous season. They are replaced by Lija Athletic the 2016–17 Maltese First Division champions, Senglea Athletic the 2016–17 Maltese First Division runners-up, and Naxxar Lions the 2016–17 Maltese First Division Third Place.

Team	In league since	City	Training Stadium	Capacity
Balzan	2011	Balzan	Victor Tedesco Stadium	6,000
Birkirkara	1990	Birkirkara	Ta' Qali National Stadium	17,797
Floriana	1986	Floriana	Independence Arena	3,000
Gżira United	2016	Gżira	Ta' Qali National Stadium	17,797
Ħamrun Spartans	2016	Ħamrun	Victor Tedesco Stadium	6,000
Hibernians	1945	Paola	Hibernians Ground	2,968
Lija Athletic	2017	Lija	Lija Stadium	500
Mosta	2011	Mosta	Charles Abela Memorial Stadium	600
Naxxar	2017	Naxxar	Centenary Stadium	2,000
Senglea Athletic	2017	Senglea	Ta' Qali National Stadium	17,000
Sliema Wanderers	1984	Sliema	Tigne Sports Complex	1,000
Saint Andrews	2015	St. Andrew's	Luxol Stadium	800
Tarxien Rainbows	2008	Tarxien	Tony Cassar Sports Ground	1,000
Valletta	1944	Valletta	Centenary Stadium	2,000

== Kits ==
Team	Kit manufacturer	Shirt sponsor
Balzan	Joma	Investors Mutual Limited
Birkirkara	Adidas	McDonald's
Floriana	Joma	Scotts Supermarket
Gżira United	Joma	Tipbet
Ħamrun Spartans	Sportika SA	Talocan
Hibernians	Joma	Bezzina
Lija Athletic	Adidas	The Falzon Group Of Companies
Mosta	Macron	Computer Domain
Naxxar	Macron	VINC
Senglea Athletic	Acerbis	
Sliema Wanderers	Adidas	DIZZ
Saint Andrews	Macron	Tipico
Tarxien Rainbows	Erreà	Cassar Ship Repairs
Valletta	Joma	Iniala

- Additionally, referee kits are made by Adidas, sponsored by TeamSports and FXDD, and Nike has a new match ball.

== Venues ==
2017–18 Maltese Premier League is located in Malta	Ta' Qali	Ta' Qali	Paola	Hamrun
2017–18 Maltese Premier League is located in Malta	Ta' Qali National Stadium	Centenary Stadium	Tony Bezzina Stadium	Victor Tedesco Stadium
2017–18 Maltese Premier League is located in Malta	Capacity: 16,997	Capacity: 3,000	Capacity: 2,968	Capacity: 1,962

== Managerial changes ==
Team	Outgoing manager	Manner of departure	Date of vacancy	Position in table	Replaced by	Date of appointment
Balzan	(Malta) Oliver Spiteri	Mutual consent	5 May 2017	Pre-season	(Serbia) Marko Mićović	24 May 2017
Valletta	(Malta) Paul Zammit	Resigned	30 May 2017	Pre-season	(Serbia) Zoran Popović	18 June 2017
Birkirkara	(Croatia) Nikola Jaroš	End of contract	1 June 2017	Pre-season	(Malta) Peter Pullicino	1 June 2017
Birkirkara	(Malta) Peter Pullicino	Sacked	1 September 2017	11th	(Malta) Paul Zammit	1 September 2017
St. Andrews	(Serbia) Danilo Dončić	Resigned	7 September 2017	9th	(Serbia) Marko Glumac	12 September 2017
Naxxar	(Malta) Dennis Fenech	Resigned	7 September 2017	13th	(England) Stuart Watkiss	8 September 2017
Valletta	(Serbia) Zoran Popović	Mutual consent	20 December 2017	3rd	(Serbia) Danilo Dončić	20 December 2017
Hibernians	(England) Mark Miller	Resigned	5 March 2018	6th	(Malta) Mario Muscat (Malta) Neil Zarb Cousin	6 March 2018

== League table ==
Pos	Team	Pld	W	D	L	GF	GA	GD	Pts	Qualification or relegation
1	Valletta (C)	26	17	7	2	40	11	+29	58	Qualification for the Champions League first qualifying round
2	Balzan	26	16	7	3	42	19	+23	55	Qualification for the Europa League first qualifying round
3	Gżira United	26	15	6	5	52	33	+19	51	Qualification for the Europa League preliminary round
4	Birkirkara	26	15	2	9	44	28	+16	47	Qualification for the Europa League preliminary round
5	Hibernians	26	13	7	6	43	16	+27	46	
6	Floriana	26	12	10	4	48	18	+30	46	
7	Sliema Wanderers	26	11	7	8	35	26	+9	40	
8	Hamrun Spartans	26	10	5	11	39	33	+6	35	
9	Senglea Athletic	26	7	5	14	29	47	−18	26	
10	Mosta	26	7	5	14	28	52	−24	26	
11	St. Andrews	26	6	6	14	21	41	−20	24	
12	Tarxien Rainbows (O)	26	6	5	15	34	56	−22	23	Qualification for the Relegation Play-Offs
13	Naxxar Lions (R)	26	5	7	14	27	41	−14	22	Relegation to the 2018–19 Maltese First Division
14	Lija Athletic (R)	26	1	3	22	23	84	−61	6	Relegation to the 2018–19 Maltese First Division

Source: Malta Football Association, Soccerway
Rules for classification: 1) Points; 2) Play-offs (only if needed to decide champions, teams for relegation or teams for UEFA competitions).
(C) Champions; (O) Play-off winners; (R) Relegated

== Results ==
Each team plays every other team in the league home-and-away for a total of 26 matches played each.

Home \ Away	BAL	BIR	FLO	GŻI	HAM	HIB	LIJ	MOS	NAX	SEN	SLI	STA	TAR	VAL
Balzan	—	2–1	1–1	0–0	2–0	1–0	4–3	2–0	2–0	2–1	0–0	3–1	1–0	2–1
Birkirkara	1–3	—	1–1	4–0	4–2	1–3	2–1	2–0	3–2	5–0	2–1	2–0	3–1	0–3
Floriana	1–1	0–2	—	1–1	1–0	0–1	6–0	5–0	2–0	3–0	1–0	4–0	5–0	1–1
Gżira United	1–2	2–0	0–0	—	4–0	3–2	3–2	2–2	3–1	4–1	2–1	1–1	3–1	2–1
Ħamrun Spartans	0–0	0–1	0–1	1–2	—	0–1	1–1	5–2	2–0	3–0	2–3	1–1	2–1	0–0
Hibernians	1–0	1–0	1–1	2–0	0–0	—	7–0	3–0	1–1	5–1	0–1	4–0	2–2	0–0
Lija Athletic	0–3	0–2	2–6	0–4	1–5	0–3	—	1–5	0–4	2–3	0–2	1–2	0–4	1–3
Mosta	0–5	0–3	2–2	3–5	0–2	0–0	3–1	—	0–2	2–1	1–1	1–0	3–1	0–1
Naxxar Lions	0–0	0–2	1–2	0–2	1–4	0–0	1–1	2–0	—	3–0	1–5	3–1	1–2	0–1
Senglea Athletic	0–1	1–0	0–0	1–1	1–3	0–1	2–0	5–2	2–1	—	3–0	2–1	2–2	0–1
Sliema Wanderers	1–2	3–0	2–2	2–1	1–0	1–0	2–0	0–1	1–1	2–2	—	1–0	1–1	0–1
St. Andrews	3–2	1–0	1–0	2–3	1–2	2–1	1–1	0–0	0–0	1–0	0–2	—	2–3	0–1
Tarxien Rainbows	3–1	1–3	0–2	1–2	1–4	0–3	2–3	0–1	5–2	1–1	2–1	0–0	—	0–2
Valletta	0–0	0–0	1–0	2–1	3–0	2–1	4–2	1–0	0–0	1–0	1–1	3–0	6–0	—

Source: Malta Football Association
Legend: Blue = home team win; Yellow = draw; Red = away team win.

== Relegation play-offs ==
A play-off match took place between the twelfth-placed team from the Premier League, Tarxien Rainbows, and the third-placed team from the First Division, Zejtun Corinthians, for a place in the 2018–19 Maltese Premier League.

27 April 2018	Tarxien Rainbows (1)	1–0	Zejtun Corinthians (2)	Paola
19:00 CEST	J. Brincat 8'			Stadium: Hibernians Stadium; Referee: Stefan Pace

== Top scorers ==
As of 21 April 2018

Rank	Player	Club	Goals
1	(Senegal) Amadou Samb	Gżira United	21
2	(Italy) Mario Fontanella	Floriana	17
3	(Montenegro) Bojan Kaljevic	Balzan	14
4	(Malta) Jake Grech	Birkirkara	11
4	(Albania) Erjon Beu	Lija Athletic	11
4	(Malta) Jurgen Degabriele	Hibernians	11
7	(Malta) Clayton Failla	Hibernians	10
7	(Nigeria) Emmanuel Okoye	Gżira United	10
7	(Mali) Samba Tounkara	Tarxien Rainbows	10
7	(Brazil) Ricardo da Silva Faria	Tarxien Rainbows	10

== Awards ==
=== Monthly awards ===
Month	Player of the Month	
Month	Player	Club
August	(Malta) Michael Mifsud	Valletta
September	(Senegal) Amadou Samb	Gżira United
October	(Brazil) Cadú	Balzan
November	(Brazil) Cadú	Balzan
December	(Italy) Maurizio Vella	Floriana
January	(Jamaica) Kemar David Reid	St. Andrews
February	(Brazil) Jackson Lima	Hibernians
March	(Italy) Matteo Piciollo	Valletta
April	(Jamaica) Kevaughn Atkinson	St. Andrews

== Attendances ==
#	Football club	Average attendance
1	Valletta FC	2,166
2	Gżira United	1,421
3	Ħamrun Spartans	1,325
4	Balzan FC	976
5	Hibernians FC	945
6	Floriana FC	892
7	Sliema Wanderers	732
8	Birkirkara FC	674
9	Senglea Athletic	493
10	Mosta FC	481
11	St. Andrews FC	402
12	Tarxien Rainbows	389
13	Naxxar Lions	268
14	Lija Athletic	230
