= 2003–04 Maltese Second Division =

Maltese Second Division
- Season: 2003–04

The 2003–04 Maltese Second Division (also known as MIA Second Division 2003–04 due to sponsorship reasons) started on 27 September 2003 and ended on 3 May 2004.

== Participating teams ==
- Attard
- Dingli Swallows
- Gozo FC
- Gzira United
- Mellieha
- St. Andrews
- St. Georges
- Vittoriosa Stars
- Xghajra Tornadoes
- Zebbug Rangers
- Zejtun Corinthians
- Zurrieq

== Changes from previous season ==
- Tarxien Rainbows and San Gwann were promoted to the 2003–04 Maltese First Division. They were replaced with Gozo FC and Xghajra Tornadoes, both relegated from 2002–03 Maltese First Division.
- Qormi and Luqa St. Andrews were relegated to the Maltese Third Division. They were replaced with Zejtun Corinthians and St. Georges, both promoted from the Third Division.

== Final standings ==
Pos	Team	Pld	W	D	L	GF	GA	GD	Pts	Promotion or relegation
1	St.Georges (C)	22	13	6	3	35	11	+24	45	Champions and promotion to 2004–05 Maltese First Division
2	Gozo FC	22	12	6	4	55	29	+26	42	Promotion playoff
3	Gzira United	22	12	6	4	31	14	+17	42	Promotion playoff
4	Mellieha	22	13	3	6	32	17	+15	42	
5	Zebbug Rangers	22	10	5	7	27	21	+6	35	
6	Attard	22	11	2	9	30	34	−4	35	
7	Vittoriosa Stars	22	9	7	6	20	16	+4	34	
8	St.Andrews	22	9	2	11	40	34	+6	29	
9	Dingli Swallows	22	8	2	12	25	31	−6	26	
10	Zurrieq (R)	22	8	0	14	24	37	−13	24	Relegation-promotion playoffs
11	Zejtun Corinthians (R)	22	3	3	16	19	49	−30	12	Relegation to 2004–05 Maltese Third Division
12	Xghajra Tornadoes (R)	22	2	2	18	12	57	−45	8	Relegation to 2004–05 Maltese Third Division

(C) Champions; (R) Relegated

== Promotion play-off ==
Team 1	Score	Team 2
Gozo	2–2 (a.e.t.) (3–2 p)	Gżira United

- Gozo promoted to Maltese First Division.

== Relegation playoffs ==
Pos	Team	Pld	W	D	L	GF	GA	GD	Pts	Promotion, qualification or relegation	QOR	KIR	ŻUR	BIR
1	Qormi (P)	3	2	1	0	7	1	+6	10	Promotion to the Second Division	—		3–0	3–0
2	Kirkop United	3	2	1	0	8	1	+7	10		1–1	—		
3	Żurrieq (R)	3	1	0	2	2	5	−3	6	Relegation to the Third Division		0–2	—	2–0
4	Birżebbuġa St. Peter's	3	0	0	3	0	10	−10	1			0–5		—

Source: RSSSF
(P) Promoted; (R) Relegated

Promotion decider
Team 1	Score	Team 2
Kirkop United	0–2	Qormi

== Top scorers ==
Goals	Player	Team
22	(Malta) John Camilleri	Gozo
17	(Malta) Chris Ciappara	Attard
14	(Malta) Robert Guzman	St.Andrews
13	(Malta) Chris Camilleri	Gozo
13	(Malta) Wayne Borg St.John	Mellieha
