= 2003–04 Maltese First Division =

Maltese First Division
- Season: 2003–04
- Champions: Żabbar St. Patrick
- Promoted: Żabbar St. Patrick; Lija Athletic
- Relegated: Tarxien Rainbows; Rabat Ajax
- Goals scored: 293
- Average goals/game: 3.25
- Top goalscorer: Ikechukwu Chibueze (18)

The 2003–04 Maltese First Division (known as the MIA First Division for sponsorship reasons) started on 13 September 2003 and finished on 9 May 2004. Marsa and Mosta were relegated from Maltese Premier League. Tarxien Rainbows and San Gwann were promoted from Maltese Second Division with the latter (San Ġwann) having won a promotion playoff against Vittoriosa Stars. St. Patrick were the champions while Lija Athletic were runners-up. Both were promoted to Maltese Premier League. Tarxien Rainbows and Rabat Ajax were relegated to Maltese Second Division with the former having just clinched promotion only to go straight down again.

== Participating teams ==
The Maltese First Division 2003–04 was made up of these teams:

- Lija Athletic
- Marsa
- Mosta
- Mqabba
- Naxxar Lions
- Rabat
- San Ġwann
- Senglea Athletic
- Żabbar St. Patrick
- Tarxien Rainbows

== Changes from previous season ==
- Msida Saint-Joseph and Balzan were promoted from the First Division to the Premier League. They were replaced by Marsa and Mosta, both relegated from 2002-03 Maltese Premier League.
- Gozo and Xgħajra Tornados were relegated to the 2003–04 Maltese Second Division. They were replaced by Tarxien Rainbows, champions of 2003–04 Maltese Second Division and San Ġwann, runners-up.

== Final league table ==
Pos	Team	Pld	W	D	L	GF	GA	GD	Pts	Promotion or relegation
1	Żabbar St. Patrick (C)	18	10	3	5	35	28	+7	33	Promotion to 2004–05 Maltese Premier League
2	Lija Athletic	18	9	5	4	31	24	+7	32	Promotion to 2004–05 Maltese Premier League
3	Mqabba	18	8	5	5	29	21	+8	29	
4	Senglea Athletic	18	7	5	6	36	28	+8	26	
5	Naxxar Lions	18	7	5	6	30	34	−4	26	
6	Mosta	18	6	7	5	34	27	+7	25	
7	Marsa	18	6	7	5	27	31	−4	25	
8	San Ġwann	18	5	6	7	23	24	−1	21	
9	Tarxien Rainbows (R)	18	5	5	8	29	33	−4	20	Relegation to 2004–05 Maltese Second Division
10	Rabat Ajax (R)	18	1	4	13	19	43	−24	7	Relegation to 2004–05 Maltese Second Division

(C) Champions; (R) Relegated

== Results ==
For a complete set of results, see 1

== Top scorers ==
As of 9 May 2004

Rank	Player	Club	Goals
1	(Nigeria) Ikechukwu Chibueze	Mqabba	18
2	(Malta) Simon Shead	Tarxien Rainbows	15
3	(Nigeria) Chima Dozie	Naxxar Lions	14
4	(Malta) Mark Tanti	St. Patrick	10
5	(Malta) Thomas Caruana	St. Patrick	9
5	(England) Trevor Thomas	Senglea Athletic	9
5	(Nigeria) Ibrahim Tarik	Marsa	9
