= 2019–20 Maltese Premier League =

Maltese Premier League
- Season: 2019–20
- Dates: 23 August 2019 – 12 March 2020
- Champions: Floriana (26th title)
- Relegated: no relegation
- Champions League: Floriana
- Europa League: Valletta; Hibernians; Sirens
- Matches: 140
- Goals: 394 (2.81 per match)
- Top goalscorer: Kristian Keqi (14 goals)
- All statistics correct as of 8 March 2020.

The 2019–20 Maltese Premier League was the 105th season of the Maltese Premier League, the top-flight league football in Malta. The fixtures were announced on 2 July 2019; the season started on 23 August 2019 and was scheduled to conclude on 25 April 2020. Valletta were the defending champions, having won their 25th title the previous season.

On 12 March 2020, due to the outbreak of the COVID-19 pandemic in Malta, a decision was made by the Malta Football Association (MFA) to suspend all football activities in Malta for ten days, after initially agreeing for football matches to be played behind closed doors. This suspension was further extended on 17 March to last until 5 April, and then suspended indefinitely on 30 March. On 18 May, the MFA Executive Committee decided to prematurely terminate the league competition and the ongoing FA Trophy competition. On 25 May, Floriana were awarded the championship after a vote taken by the MFA council, their 26th title and level with Sliema Wanderers in the all-time champions list. Floriana topped the standings with 41 points at the time the league was halted. Valletta, Hibernians and Sirens were awarded the three UEFA Europa League spots based on sporting merits. Furthermore, relegation was scrapped across all leagues even if there was mathematic certainty.

== Effects of the COVID-19 pandemic ==
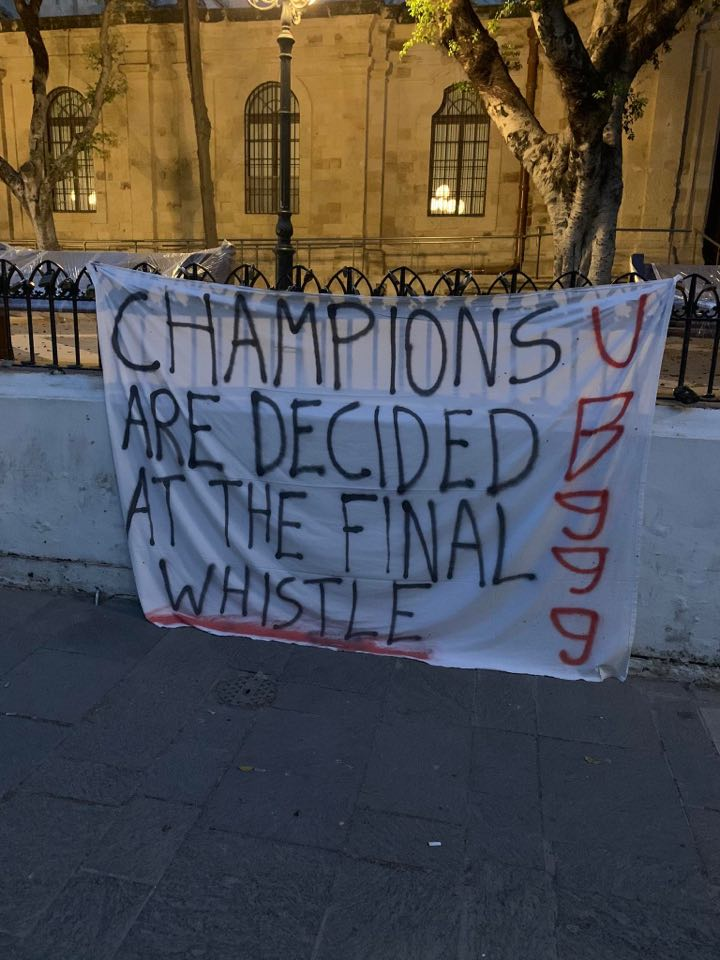
Banner hoisted by Valletta fan group, Ultras Beltin 999, in support of their mother club's political will to continue playing the final six matches

The league season has been affected by the COVID-19 pandemic since March. Valletta, Birkirkara and Gżira United proposed to the Malta Football Association that the league is not to be cancelled but resumes in June for training and in July when the first matches are to be played. These suggestions were dismissed by the Superintendent for Public Health, Charmaine Gauci, emphasizing that measures will only be lifted once the situation stabilizes. Eventually, the three clubs wrote to the Prime Minister of Malta Robert Abela to either resume the competition or cancel any sport until a vaccine is found.

On 25 May 2020, upon the assigning of the league title to Floriana, spontaneous celebrations cropped up in the town's main square. This was later ended by the Malta Police Force due to social distancing measures still being in place, although some reports argued that this was not timely. This celebration was later decried by the public and local entities. The Superintendent of Public Health recommended that all those who attended the celebration get tested; a day after this appeal a surge in phonecalls on the COVID-19 helpline was reported related with this event. The police force started an investigation on the matter.

Tarxien Rainbows, who gathered four points in 20 matches and were already mathematically relegated by 8 March 2020, kept their place in next season's top tier after it was agreed that relegations would be scrapped. The vote passed by the MFA council scrapped relegation to avoid an odd number in the following season and therefore avoid weekly byes.

== Teams ==
Location of teams in 2019–20 Maltese Premier League

Fourteen teams will compete in the league – the top eleven teams from the previous season and three teams promoted from the First Division. The promoted teams are Sirens, Gudja United and St. Lucia who will be playing their first season in the top division. They replace Qormi, Pietà Hotspurs (both teams relegated after one season back in the league) and St. Andrews, the latter losing the relegation play-off against St. Lucia to become the first Premier League side to lose this play-off against a First Division team.

Team	In league since	City	Training Stadium	Capacity
Balzan	2011	Balzan	St. Aloysius Sports and Recreational Complex	100
Birkirkara	1990	Birkirkara	Mgarr Ground	0
Floriana	1986	Floriana	Independence Arena (Floriana)	0
Gudja United	2019	Gudja	Louis Azzopardi Stadium	
Gżira United	2016	Gżira	Gzira Football Ground	0
Ħamrun Spartans	2016	Ħamrun	Victor Tedesco Stadium	6,000
Hibernians	1945	Paola	Hibernians Ground	2,968
Mosta	2011	Mosta	Charles Abela Memorial Stadium	600
St. Lucia	2019	Santa Luċija	Grawnd Santa Luċija	
Senglea Athletic	2017	Senglea	Corradino C	100
Sirens	2019	St. Paul's Bay	Sirens Stadium	600
Sliema Wanderers	1984	Sliema	Tigne Sports Complex	1,000
Tarxien Rainbows	2008	Tarxien	Tony Cassar Sports Ground	1,000
Valletta	1944	Valletta	Sirens Stadium	600

=== Personnel and kits ===
Team	Manager	Kit manufacturer	Shirt sponsor
Balzan	(Malta) Ludvig Bartolo (caretaker)	Joma	Investors Mutual Limited
Birkirkara	(Netherlands) André Paus	Adidas	McDonald's
Floriana	(Italy) Vincenzo Potenza	Joma	Scotts Supermarket, Guess?, Go & Fun, Chanlai Auto Dealer, Evergreen Greengrocer, Terranova, Cafe' Pascucci
Gudja United	(Malta) Cyril Buttigieg	Givova	All Nuts, Emilio Bilocca Handy Man
Gżira United	(Malta) Paul Zammit	Puma	
Ħamrun Spartans	(Malta) Mark Buttigieg	Joma	Mach Power
Hibernians	(Italy) Stefano Sanderra	Joma	Bezzina
Mosta	(England) Mark Miller	Macron	Dimbros, Nilmar
Senglea Athletic	(Italy) Giorgio Roselli	Givova	Palumbo
Sirens	(Malta) Steve D'Amato	Macron	Teamsport, Gillieru Harbour Hotel, Valyou Supermarket
Sliema Wanderers	(Italy) Andrea Pisanu	Adidas	North Key Real-Estate, Zarb Coaches
St. Lucia	(Malta) Oliver Spiteri	Macron	Multivend
Tarxien Rainbows	(Malta) Demis Paul Scerri	Erreà	Cassar Ship Repairs
Valletta	(Italy) Giovanni Tedesco	Puma	Iniala

- Additionally, referee kits are made by Adidas, sponsored by TeamSports and FXDD.

=== Managerial changes ===
Team	Outgoing manager	Manner of departure	Date of vacancy	Position in table	Incoming manager	Date of appointment
Floriana	(Italy) Guido Ugolotti	End of contract		Pre-season	(Italy) Vincenzo Potenza	15 May 2019
Ħamrun Spartans	(Italy) Giovanni Tedesco	Resigned	17 May 2019	Pre-season	(Italy) Manuele Blasi	23 May 2019
Gżira United	(Malta) Jesmond Zerafa		22 May 2019	Pre-season	(Italy) Giovanni Tedesco	22 May 2019
Valletta	(Malta) Gilbert Agius	End of caretaker	23 May 2019	Pre-season	(Malta) Darren Abdilla	23 May 2019
Senglea Athletic	(Italy) Vincenzo Potenza	Signed by Floriana	15 May 2019	Pre-season	(Malta) Mario Muscat	12 June 2019
Sirens	(Malta) Vince Carbonaro	Mutual consent	27 June 2019	Pre-season	(Malta) Steve D'Amato	5 July 2019
Tarxien Rainbows	(Malta) Jose Borg	Mutual consent	30 July 2019	Pre-season	(Serbia) Marko Glumac	30 July 2019
Birkirkara	(Malta) John Buttigieg	Resigned	7 September 2019	12th	(Netherlands) André Paus	9 September 2019
Tarxien Rainbows	(Serbia) Marko Glumac	Mutual consent	12 November 2019	14th	(Malta) Demis Paul Scerri	12 November 2019
Senglea Athletic	(Malta) Mario Muscat	Mutual consent	2 January 2020	12th	(Italy) Giorgio Roselli	10 January 2020
Gżira United	(Italy) Giovanni Tedesco	Sacked	21 January 2020	4th	(Malta) Paul Zammit	23 January 2020
Ħamrun Spartans	(Italy) Manuele Blasi	Sacked	1 February 2020	9th	(Malta) Mark Buttigieg	1 February 2020
Sliema Wanderers	(Italy) Alfonso Greco	Mutual consent	11 February 2020	12th	(Italy) Andrea Pisanu	13 February 2020
Valletta	(Malta) Darren Abdilla	Sacked	17 February 2020	2nd	(Italy) Giovanni Tedesco	19 February 2020
Balzan	(Malta) Jacques Scerri	Resigned	3 March 2020	8th	(Malta) Ludvig Bartolo (caretaker)	3 March 2020

== Venues ==
2019–20 Maltese Premier League is located in Malta	Ta' Qali	Ta' Qali	Paola
2019–20 Maltese Premier League is located in Malta	Ta' Qali National Stadium	Centenary Stadium	Tony Bezzina Stadium
2019–20 Maltese Premier League is located in Malta	Capacity: 16,997	Capacity: 3,000	Capacity: 2,968

== League table ==
Pos	Team	Pld	W	D	L	GF	GA	GD	Pts	Qualification or relegation
1	Floriana (C)	20	12	5	3	38	15	+23	41	Qualification for the Champions League first qualifying round
2	Valletta	20	11	5	4	32	22	+10	38	Qualification for the Europa League first qualifying round
3	Hibernians	20	11	4	5	34	20	+14	37	Qualification for the Europa League first qualifying round
4	Sirens	20	10	5	5	30	26	+4	35	Qualification for the Europa League first qualifying round
5	Birkirkara	20	9	6	5	30	20	+10	33	
6	Gżira United	20	9	5	6	35	19	+16	32	
7	Balzan	20	8	4	8	33	29	+4	28	
8	Mosta	20	9	1	10	29	35	−6	28	
9	Ħamrun Spartans	20	6	7	7	24	25	−1	25	
10	Sliema Wanderers	20	7	3	10	24	22	+2	24	
11	Gudja United	20	6	6	8	24	30	−6	24	
12	St. Lucia	20	6	5	9	24	33	−9	23	
13	Senglea Athletic (Note: Senglea Athletic and Tarxien Rainbows kept their place in the top-flight as relegations were scrapped for the league season.)	20	3	7	10	21	39	−18	16	~~Relegation to the 2020–21 Maltese Challenge League~~
14	Tarxien Rainbows	20	1	1	18	18	61	−43	4	~~Relegation to the 2020–21 Maltese Challenge League~~

Source: Malta Football Association
Rules for classification: 1) Points; 2) Play-offs (only if needed to decide champions, teams for relegation or teams for UEFA competitions).
(C) Champions

== Results ==
Home \ Away	BAL	BIR	FLO	GUD	GŻI	ĦAM	HIB	MOS	SEN	SIR	SLI	SLC	TAR	VAL
Balzan	—	0–0	1–3	1–0	1–3	1–1	—	5–0	—	2–4	2–1	—	3–0	0–2
Birkirkara	3–3	—	0–1	2–3	1–3	—	2–1	2–1	1–1	2–0	—	—	3–0	2–2
Floriana	1–0	0–1	—	1–2	0–0	—	2–2	—	5–0	3–0	—	2–1	2–1	0–1
Gudja United	0–2	—	0–2	—	—	1–1	1–1	—	4–1	—	1–0	1–1	3–2	0–1
Gżira United	2–0	0–2	2–2	6–1	—	0–0	—	3–1	—	0–1	1–1	1–2	—	0–1
Ħamrun Spartans	—	0–0	0–0	2–2	0–3	—	1–2	0–2	1–0	4–0	—	1–1	2–3	0–1
Hibernians	2–1	0–1	—	2–0	2–0	1–2	—	3–1	2–1	0–2	1–0	—	4–1	—
Mosta	—	1–1	1–3	1–0	—	2–1	1–2	—	1–0	3–4	—	1–0	5–2	0–4
Senglea Athletic	2–2	1–0	—	—	1–3	1–3	1–1	2–1	—	2–2	2–0	2–5	2–2	—
Sirens	—	—	1–4	1–1	—	1–2	2–1	2–0	1–1	—	0–0	3–1	—	0–0
Sliema Wanderers	1–2	2–1	1–2	1–1	2–0	2–0	—	0–1	4–1	0–1	—	—	1–0	1–3
St. Lucia	0–3	0–2	—	2–1	0–0	—	0–2	1–2	0–0	0–2	0–4	—	2–1	2–2
Tarxien Rainbows	1–3	—	0–4	—	0–5	2–3	0–4	0–4	—	0–3	1–2	1–3	—	—
Valletta	3–1	1–4	1–1	0–2	1–3	—	1–1	—	1–0	—	2–1	2–3	3–1	—

Source: Malta Football Association
Legend: Blue = home team win; Yellow = draw; Red = away team win.
For upcoming matches, an "a" indicates there is an article about the rivalry between the two participants.

=== Positions by round ===
The table lists the positions of teams after each week of matches. In order to preserve chronological evolvements, any postponed matches are not included to the round at which they were originally scheduled, but added to the full round they were played immediately afterwards.

Leader and 2020–21 UEFA Champions League first qualifying round
2020–21 UEFA Europa League first qualifying round
2020–21 UEFA Europa League preliminary round
Relegation play-offs
Relegation to First Division

Team ╲ Round	1	2	3	4	5	6	7	8	9	10	11	12	13	14	15	16	17	18	19	20
Floriana	4	1	3	3	2	1	1	1	1	1	1	1	1	1	1	1	1	1	1	1
Valletta	11	7	7	5	5	7	5	5	6	4	3	3	3	4	3	2	2	2	2	2
Hibernians	6	2	6	4	3	5	8	7	5	5	5	5	4	3	2	4	3	3	4	3
Sirens	8	3	1	7	4	2	4	3	3	2	4	4	5	5	5	3	4	4	3	4
Birkirkara	13	12	12	12	13	11	11	11	11	10	8	10	8	7	7	8	6	6	6	5
Gżira United	9	11	11	10	7	4	3	2	2	3	2	2	2	2	4	5	5	5	5	6
Balzan	3	8	8	11	12	10	9	9	9	7	7	7	6	6	6	6	7	8	7	7
Mosta	1	6	9	8	10	9	7	6	7	8	9	11	9	8	9	7	9	9	9	8
Ħamrun Spartans	10	10	4	1	1	3	2	4	4	6	6	6	7	9	8	9	8	7	8	9
Sliema Wanderers	12	13	13	13	9	12	12	12	13	13	11	8	10	10	12	10	12	11	11	10
Gudja United	5	9	10	9	11	13	13	13	12	12	12	9	11	11	10	12	11	10	12	11
St. Lucia	2	4	5	2	6	6	10	10	10	11	13	13	13	13	13	11	10	12	10	12
Senglea Athletic	7	5	2	6	8	8	6	8	8	9	10	12	12	12	11	13	13	13	13	13
Tarxien Rainbows	14	14	14	14	14	14	14	14	14	14	14	14	14	14	14	14	14	14	14	14

Updated to match(es) played on 8 March 2020. Source: WorldFootball.net

== Season statistics ==
=== Top goalscorers ===
As of 8 March 2020

Rank	Player	Club	Goals
1	(Albania) Kristian Keqi	Floriana	14
2	(Italy) Mario Fontanella	Valletta	13
3	(Serbia) Andrija Majdevac	Balzan	11
4	(Brazil) Jefferson Assis	Gżira United	10
4	(Argentina) Federico Falcone	Birkirkara	10
6	(Serbia) Aleksa Andrejić	Tarxien Rainbows	9
6	(Brazil) Tiago Adan	Floriana	9
8	(Argentina) Imanol Iriberri	Hibernians	8
8	(Malta) Jake Grech	Hibernians	8
10	(Morocco) Soufiane Lagzir	Ħamrun Spartans	7
10	(Brazil) Jose Wilkson Teixeira	Senglea Athletic	7

=== Hat-tricks ===
Player	For	Against	Result	Date
(Brazil) Jefferson Assis^{4}	Gżira United	Gudja United	6–1	26 October 2019
(Serbia) Andrija Majdevac	Balzan	St. Lucia	3–0	13 December 2019
(Serbia) Aleksa Andrejic	Tarxien Rainbows	Ħamrun Spartans	3–2	1 February 2020
(Italy) Mario Fontanella	Valletta	Balzan	3–1	8 February 2020
(Albania) Kristian Keqi	Floriana	Sirens	3–0	6 March 2020

Notes

^{4} Player scored 4 goals

== Awards ==
=== Monthly awards ===
Month	Player of the Month	
Month	Player	Club
August	(Malta) Jake Grech	Hibernians
September	(Brazil) Diego Venancio da Silva	Floriana
October	(Brazil) Jefferson Assis	Gżira United
November	(Serbia) Andrija Majdevac	Balzan
December	(Serbia) Andrija Majdevac	Balzan
January	(Malta) Dexter Xuereb	Mosta/Gżira United
February	(Italy) Juri Cisotti	Sliema Wanderers
