= 2001–02 Maltese Second Division =

Maltese Second Division
- Season: 2001–02
- Champions: Msida SJ
- Promoted: Msida SJ; Senglea Athletics
- Relegated: Melita; Santa Venera Lightning
- Goals scored: 324
- Average goals/game: 2.45
- Top goalscorer: Jean Pierre Mifsud Triganza (24)

The 2001–02 Maltese Second Division (known as Rothmans Second Division 2001-02 due to sponsorship reasons) started on 29 September 2001 and ended on 19 May 2002.The relegated teams were Tarxien Rainbows and Zurrieq.The promoted teams were Msida SJ and Senglea Athletics. Msida SJ finished as champions, therefore being promoted once again, having just been promoted. Senglea Athletics too were promoted having just been promoted. Melita were relegated alongside Santa Venera Lightning. The latter lost a relegation playoff with Attard 1-0.

== Participating teams ==
- Attard
- Dingli Swallows
- Gzira United
- Luqa St. Andrews
- Melita
- Mellieha
- Msida Saint-Joseph
- Senglea Athletics
- Santa Venera Lightning
- Tarxien Rainbows
- Zebbug Rangers
- Zurrieq

== Changes from previous season ==
- Mqabba and Balzan Youths were promoted to the First Division. They were replaced with Tarxien Rainbows and Zurrieq, both relegated from 2000–01 Maltese First Division
- Santa Lucia and Siggiewi were relegated to the Third Division. They were replaced with Msida Saint-Joseph and Senglea Athletics, both promoted from the Third Division.

== Final standings ==
| Pos | Team | Pld | W | D | L | GF | GA | GD | Pts | Promotion or relegation |
|---|---|---|---|---|---|---|---|---|---|---|
| 1 | Msida SJ (C) | 22 | 16 | 6 | 0 | 47 | 12 | +35 | 54 | Champions and promotion to 2002–03 Maltese First Division |
| 2 | Senglea Athletics | 22 | 13 | 7 | 2 | 35 | 17 | +18 | 46 | Promotion to 2002–03 Maltese First Division |
| 3 | Tarxien Rainbows | 22 | 13 | 5 | 4 | 33 | 14 | +19 | 44 | |
| 4 | Zurrieq | 22 | 8 | 8 | 6 | 24 | 18 | +6 | 32 | |
| 5 | Zebbug Rangers | 22 | 7 | 8 | 7 | 18 | 19 | −1 | 29 | |
| 6 | Mellieha | 22 | 7 | 7 | 8 | 23 | 27 | −4 | 28 | |
| 7 | Dingli Swallows | 22 | 8 | 3 | 11 | 34 | 34 | 0 | 27 | |
| 8 | Gzira United | 22 | 6 | 7 | 9 | 24 | 27 | −3 | 25 | |
| 9 | Luqa St.Andrews | 22 | 7 | 3 | 12 | 24 | 34 | −10 | 24 | |
| 10 | Santa Venera Lightning (R) | 22 | 6 | 4 | 12 | 26 | 36 | −10 | 22 | Relegation play-offs |
| 11 | Attard | 22 | 6 | 4 | 12 | 21 | 44 | −23 | 22 | Relegation play-offs |
| 12 | Melita (R) | 22 | 2 | 4 | 16 | 15 | 42 | −27 | 10 | Relegation to 2002–03 Maltese Third Division |

(C) Champions; (R) Relegated

== Relegation play-off ==
| Team 1 | Score | Team 2 |
|---|---|---|
| Attard | 1–0 | Santa Venera |

- Santa Venera relegated to Maltese Third Division

== Top scorers ==
| Goals | Player | Team |
|---|---|---|
| 24 | (Malta) Jean Pierre Mifsud Triganza | Msida |
| 11 | (Malta) Aldrin Muscat | Zurrieq |
| 9 | (Malta) Jonathan Sapiano | Dingli |
| 9 | (Malta) Michael Borg Olivier | Dingli |
| 9 | (Malta) Trevor Thomas | Senglea |
