= 2002–03 Maltese Second Division =

Maltese Second Division
- Season: 2002–03

The 2002–03 Maltese Second Division started on 28 September 2002 and finished on 18 May 2003.

== Participating teams ==
- Attard
- Dingli
- Gzira
- Luqa
- Mellieha
- Qormi
- San Gwann
- St. Andrews
- Tarxien
- Vittoriosa
- Zebbug
- Zurrieq

== Changes from previous season ==
Promoted from Maltese Third Division

- San Gwann F.C.
- Vittoriosa Stars F.C.

Relegated from 2001–02 Maltese First Division

- Qormi F.C.
- St. Andrews F.C.

== Final standings ==
Pos	Team	Pld	W	D	L	GF	GA	GD	Pts	Promotion or relegation
1	Tarxien	22	15	5	2	57	22	+35	50	Champions and promotion to 2003–04 Maltese First Division
2	Vittoriosa	22	12	6	4	35	21	+14	42	Promotion playoff
3	San Gwann	22	12	6	4	50	27	+23	42	Promotion playoff
4	Zurrieq	22	9	7	6	25	19	+6	34	
5	Mellieha	22	9	7	6	35	28	+7	34	
6	Attard	22	8	6	8	28	32	−4	30	
7	Dingli	22	9	1	12	31	41	−10	28	
8	Zebbug	22	4	12	6	21	21	0	24	
9	St. Andrews	22	6	6	10	28	30	−2	24	
10	Gzira	22	6	4	12	27	45	−18	22	
11	Qormi	22	6	3	13	21	33	−12	21 (Note: Vittoriosa, Gzira, Mellieha, Zurrieq, St. Andrews, Tarxien, San Gwann, Dingli and Luqa got a walkover over Qormi. Qormi were suspended till the end of the season and were relegated to Maltese Third Division)	Relegation to 2003–04 Maltese Third Division
12	Luqa	22	3	3	16	18	57	−39	12	Relegation to 2003–04 Maltese Third Division

== Promotion play-off ==
Team 1	Score	Team 2
San Gwann	2–1	Vittoriosa Stars

- San Gwann promoted to Maltese First Division

== Top scorers ==
Goals	Player	Team
27	(Malta) Simon Shead	Tarxien
21	(Malta) Mark Psaila	San Gwann
9	(Italy) Aaron Guazzo	Tarxien
8	(Nigeria) Larry Lagana	Vittoriosa
8	(Malta) Karl Sciberras	San Gwann
8	(Malta) Adrian Galea	Mellieha
