= 2000–01 Maltese First Division =

Maltese First Division
- Season: 2000–01
- Champions: Marsa
- Promoted: Marsa; Lija Athletic
- Relegated: Tarxien Rainbows; Żurrieq
- Goals scored: 270
- Average goals/game: 3
- Top goalscorer: Kevin Loughborough (12)

The 2000–01 Maltese First Division (known as the Rothmans First Division for sponsorship reasons) started on 9 September 2000 and finished on 29 April 2001. Gozo and Żurrieq were the relegated teams from the 1999–2000 Maltese Premier League. Marsaxlokk and Qormi were the promoted teams from the Maltese Second Division. Marsa finished as champions, by just one point, and were promoted to the 2001–02 Maltese Premier League alongside Lija Athletic, who finished runners-up. Tarxien Rainbows and Żurrieq were relegated to the 2001–02 Maltese Second Division. This was the second straight relegation for Żurrieq, having been relegated from the Premier League the previous season. Marsa suffered their only defeat at the hands of Żurrieq.

== Participating teams ==
The Maltese First Division 2000–01 was made up of these teams:

- Gozo
- Lija Athletic
- Marsa
- Marsaxlokk
- Mosta
- Qormi
- St. Andrews
- St. Patrick
- Tarxien Rainbows
- Żurrieq

== Changes from previous season ==
- Ħamrun Spartans and Xgħajra Tornados were promoted from the First Division to the Premier League. They were replaced with Gozo and Żurrieq, both relegated from 1999–2000 Maltese Premier League.
- Gżira United and Żebbuġ Rangers were relegated to the Second Division. They were replaced by Marsaxlokk, champions of 1999–2000 Second Division, and Qormi, runner up of 1999–2000 Second Division.

== Final league table ==
Pos	Team	Pld	W	D	L	GF	GA	GD	Pts	Promotion or relegation
1	Marsa (C)	18	9	8	1	31	16	+15	35	Promotion to 2001–02 Maltese Premier League
2	Lija Athletic	18	10	4	4	36	20	+16	34	Promotion to 2001–02 Maltese Premier League
3	Qormi	18	10	2	6	30	19	+11	32	
4	St. Patrick	18	8	3	7	28	26	+2	27	
5	Mosta	18	7	4	7	32	26	+6	25	
6	Marsaxlokk	18	7	4	7	26	22	+4	25	
7	Gozo	18	7	3	8	28	28	0	24	
8	St. Andrews	18	5	5	8	25	37	−12	20	
9	Tarxien Rainbows (R)	18	5	3	10	20	29	−9	18	Relegation to 2001–02 Maltese Second Division
10	Żurrieq (R)	18	2	4	12	14	45	−31	10	Relegation to 2001–02 Maltese Second Division

(C) Champions; (R) Relegated

== Results ==
For a complete set of results, see 1.

== Top scorers ==
As of 29 April 2001

Rank	Player	Club	Goals
1	(England) Kevin Loughborough	St. Patrick	12
2	(Malta) Johann Zammit	Mosta	11
3	(Malta) Matthew Calascione	St. Andrews	10
4	(Nigeria) Uwa Ogbodo	Qormi	9
4	(Malta) Alan Tabone	Lija Athletic	9
