= 2001–02 Maltese First Division =

Maltese First Division
- Season: 2001–02
- Champions: Marsaxlokk
- Promoted: Marsaxlokk; Mosta
- Relegated: Qormi; St. Andrews
- Goals scored: 279
- Average goals/game: 3.1
- Top goalscorer: Johann Zammit (16)

The 2001–02 Maltese First Division (known as the Rothmans First Division for sponsorship reasons) started on 15 September 2001 and finished on 28 April 2002. Rabat Ajax and Xgħajra Tornados were relegated from the Maltese Premier League. Mqabba and Balzan Youths were promoted from Maltese Second Division. Marsaxlokk were the champions while Mosta were the runners-up. Both teams were promoted to Maltese Premier League. Qormi and St. Andrews were relegated to Maltese Second Division.

== Participating teams ==
The Maltese First Division 2001–02 was made up of these teams:

- Balzan Youths
- Gozo
- Marsaxlokk
- Mosta
- Mqabba
- Qormi
- Rabat Ajax
- St. Andrews
- St. Patrick
- Xgħajra Tornados

== Changes from previous season ==
- Marsa and Lija Athletic were promoted from the First Division to the Premier League. They were replaced with Rabat Ajax and Xgħajra Tornados, both relegated from 2000–01 Maltese Premier League.
- Tarxien Rainbows and Żurrieq were relegated to the 2001–02 Maltese Second Division. They were replaced with Mqabba, champions of 2000–01 Second Division and Balzan Youths, runners-up.

== Final league table ==
Pos	Team	Pld	W	D	L	GF	GA	GD	Pts	Promotion or relegation
1	Marsaxlokk (C)	18	13	4	1	46	15	+31	43	Promotion to 2002–03 Maltese Premier League
2	Mosta	18	11	6	1	33	14	+19	39	Promotion to 2002–03 Maltese Premier League
3	Xgħajra Tornados	18	7	3	8	22	29	−7	24	
4	Rabat Ajax	18	7	2	9	34	35	−1	23	
5	Balzan	18	6	5	7	26	28	−2	23	
6	Mqabba	18	5	8	5	20	25	−5	23	
7	Gozo	18	5	7	6	30	30	0	22	
8	St. Patrick	18	6	3	9	24	35	−11	21	
9	Qormi (R)	18	3	5	10	21	28	−7	14	Relegation to 2002–03 Maltese Second Division
10	St. Andrews (R)	18	2	7	9	23	40	−17	13	Relegation to 2002–03 Maltese Second Division

(C) Champions; (R) Relegated

== Results ==
For a complete set of results, see

== Top scorers ==
As of 28 April 2002

Rank	Player	Club	Goals
1	(Malta) Johann Zammit	Marsaxlokk	16
2	(Nigeria) Engoya Onesime Ulrich	Rabat Ajax	12
3	(Malta) Paul Zammit	Mosta	11
3	(Malta) William Borg	Rabat Ajax	11
5	(Malta) Gilbert Scerri	St. Patrick	10
