= Andrea Cassar =

Maltese footballer (born 1992)

Personal information
- Date of birth: 19 December 1992 (age 33)
- Place of birth: Ħamrun, Malta
- Height: 1.77 m (5 ft 10 in)
- Position: Goalkeeper

Team information
- Current team: Tarxien Rainbows
- Number: 1

Senior career*
Years	Team	Apps	(Gls)
2009–2015	Ħamrun Spartans	19	(0)
2011–2012	→ Birkirkara (loan)		(0)
2014–2015	→ Pembroke Athleta (loan)	14	(0)
2015–2019	Tarxien Rainbows	68	(0)
2019–2021	Floriana	5+	(0)
2021–2022	Marsa		(0)
2022–2025	Sirens	46	(0)
2025–	Tarxien Rainbows	20	(0)

International career
	Malta U19	3	(0)
–2013	Malta U21	1	(0)
- * Club domestic league appearances and goals as of 4 May 2026

Andrea Cassar (born 19 December 1992) is a Maltese professional footballer who plays as a goalkeeper for Maltese Premier League club Tarxien Rainbows.

== Club career ==
Cassar began his career with his hometown club Ħamrun Spartans in 2009 but did not make his debut until 2010. He also spent the end of the 2011–12 season on loan with Birkirkara.

He was approached to match fix a match against Hibernians in February 2013 but he declined twice before he reported the match fixing. In 2014, he was allowed to leave on loan until his contract expired.

Cassar joined Pembroke Athleta on a one-year loan deal valid until 2015 and after his contract with Ħamrun Spartans expired, he joined Tarxien Rainbows. He made 86 appearances for the club between 2015 and 2019.

He joined Floriana in July 2019 on a one-year contract but was sidelined for most of the 2019–20 season before he signed a contract extension until 2021; he left Floriana upon the expiry of his contract in May 2021 after a series of injuries limited his playing time.

He joined Marsa in July 2021, and then he joined Sirens in July 2022. He left Sirens in June 2025.

He rejoined Tarxien Rainbows in June 2025 after they won promotion back to the Maltese Premier League but he suffered a groin injury on the second matchday.

== International career ==
Cassar played for the Malta U19 and U21 teams but as a result of the match fixing, he was no longer called up to the U21 team by February 2013.

== Honours ==
Pembroke Athleta

- Maltese Challenge League: 2014–15

Floriana

- Maltese Premier League: 2019–20
