= Caio Garcia =

Brazilian footballer (born 1987)

Personal information
- Full name: Caio Garcia Suguino
- Date of birth: 3 November 1987 (age 38)
- Place of birth: Brazil
- Position: Midfielder

Senior career*
Years	Team	Apps	(Gls)
-2006	ABC Futebol Clube		
2006-2007	UD Poblense		
2007-2008	Fútbol Alcobendas Sport		
2008-2009	Atlètic de Ciutadella		
2009-2010	CS ACU Arad		
2010-2011	FC Milsami Orhei	32	(5)
2011-2012	Tarxien Rainbows F.C.	12	(0)
2012	Qormi F.C.	4	(1)
2012-2013	Gżira United F.C.	7	(1)
2013	Esporte Clube Comercial		
2013	Náutico Futebol Clube	2	(0)
2013-2014	Cerro Largo F.C.	2	(0)
2014	América Futebol Clube		
2014-2016	FC Fribourg		
2015-2016	FC Stade-Payerne		
2016-2018	FC Portalban/Gletterens		
2018-2019	FC Stade-Payerne		
- * Club domestic league appearances and goals

Caio Garcia Suguino (born 3 November 1987) is a Brazilian footballer.
