= 2004–05 Maltese Second Division =

Maltese Second Division
- Season: 2004–05

The 2004–05 Maltese Second Division started on 25 September 2004 and ended on 9 May 2005.

== Participating teams ==
- Attard
- Dingli
- Gzira
- Melita
- Mellieha
- Qormi
- Rabat
- St.Andrews
- Santa Venera
- Tarxien
- Vittoriosa
- Zebbug

== Changes from previous season ==
Promoted from Maltese Third Division

- Melita F.C.
- Santa Venera Lightning
- Qormi F.C.

Relegated from 2003–04 Maltese First Division

- Tarxien Rainbows F.C.
- Rabat Ajax F.C.

== Final standings ==
| Pos | Team | Pld | W | D | L | GF | GA | GD | Pts | Promotion or relegation |
|---|---|---|---|---|---|---|---|---|---|---|
| 1 | Tarxien | 22 | 16 | 5 | 1 | 40 | 11 | +29 | 53 | Champions and promotion to 2005–06 Maltese First Division |
| 2 | St.Andrews | 22 | 12 | 5 | 5 | 36 | 18 | +18 | 41 | Promotion to 2005–06 Maltese First Division |
| 3 | Qormi | 22 | 9 | 8 | 5 | 26 | 19 | +7 | 35 | |
| 4 | Mellieha | 22 | 9 | 3 | 10 | 33 | 30 | +3 | 30 | |
| 5 | Dingli | 22 | 8 | 6 | 8 | 26 | 28 | −2 | 30 | |
| 6 | Zebbug | 22 | 8 | 5 | 9 | 20 | 23 | −3 | 29 | |
| 7 | Attard | 22 | 8 | 4 | 10 | 28 | 25 | +3 | 28 | |
| 8 | Vittoriosa | 22 | 9 | 1 | 12 | 19 | 31 | −12 | 28 | |
| 9 | Gzira | 22 | 8 | 6 | 8 | 23 | 23 | 0 | 27 (Note: 3 points deducted?) | |
| 10 | Melita | 22 | 7 | 5 | 10 | 23 | 30 | −7 | 26 | Relegation playoffs |
| 11 | Santa Venera | 22 | 4 | 7 | 11 | 18 | 41 | −23 | 19 | Relegation to 2005–06 Maltese Third Division |
| 12 | Rabat | 22 | 4 | 5 | 13 | 26 | 39 | −13 | 17 | Relegation to 2005–06 Maltese Third Division |

== Relegation playoffs ==
| Pos | Team | Pld | W | D | L | GF | GA | GD | Pts | Promotion, qualification or relegation | MLT | STL | BIR | ŻEJ |
|---|---|---|---|---|---|---|---|---|---|---|---|---|---|---|
| 1 | Melita (O) | 3 | 3 | 0 | 0 | 6 | 0 | +6 | 12 | Remain in the Second Division | — | 2–0 | | 3–0 |
| 2 | Santa Lucia | 3 | 1 | 1 | 1 | 4 | 4 | 0 | 7 | | | — | 1–1 | |
| 3 | Birżebbuġa St. Peter's | 3 | 0 | 2 | 1 | 3 | 4 | −1 | 4 | | 0–1 | | — | 2–2 |
| 4 | Żejtun Corinthians | 3 | 0 | 1 | 2 | 3 | 8 | −5 | 2 | | | 1–3 | | — |

Source: RSSSF
(O) Play-off winners

=== Top scorers ===
| Goals | Player | Team |
|---|---|---|
| 14 | (Malta) Simon Shead | Tarxien |
| 14 | (Malta) Wayne Borg St. John | Mellieha |
| 13 | (Malta) Kurt Coleiro | St.Andrews |
| 11 | (Malta) Carlos Camenzuli | Tarxien |
| 9 | (Malta) Jason Borg | Attard |

== Results ==
| Home \ Away | ATT | DIN | GZI | MLT | MLL | QOR | RAB | STA | STV | TAR | VIT | ZEB |
|---|---|---|---|---|---|---|---|---|---|---|---|---|
| Attard | | 4–0 | 0–1 | 0–3 | 1–2 | 0–0 | 1–0 | 0–1 | 3–0 | 0–1 | 0–1 | 0–5 |
| Dingli | 1–4 | | 2–0 | 0–1 | 2–1 | 1–2 | 1–0 | 0–2 | 5–1 | 0–0 | 2–1 | 1–1 |
| Gzira | 2–0 | 0–1 | | 2–0 | 1–1 | 0–0 | 1–1 | 0–1 | 3–1 | 0–2 | 0–0 | 1–1 |
| Melita | 2–3 | 1–0 | 2–0 | | 0–2 | 0–1 | 2–2 | 1–0 | 2–3 | 1–4 | 0–1 | 0–0 |
| Mellieha | 0–4 | 1–1 | 0–1 | 1–2 | | 3–1 | 3–0 | 2–1 | 1–1 | 1–2 | 2–1 | 0–2 |
| Qormi | 1–0 | 2–2 | 3–2 | 1–1 | 3–2 | | 1–3 | 0–0 | 0–0 | 0–0 | 0–1 | 2–0 |
| Rabat | 1–1 | 0–1 | 3–3 | 1–0 | 1–2 | 1–3 | | 0–3 | 3–1 | 1–3 | 1–2 | 0–0 |
| St. Andrews | 0–2 | 3–3 | 0–1 | 0–0 | 2–1 | 0–0 | 4–3 | | 5–0 | 1–1 | 4–1 | 5–0 |
| S.Venera | 1–1 | 1–1 | 1–2 | 1–1 | 1–4 | 0–2 | 2–0 | 0–2 | | 1–4 | 0–1 | 1–0 |
| Tarxien | 1–1 | 2–0 | 2–1 | 5–1 | 2–1 | 1–0 | 2–0 | 0–1 | 1–1 | | 2–0 | 2–0 |
| Vittoriosa | 2–1 | 1–0 | 0–2 | 0–1 | 0–3 | 0–4 | 1–5 | 3–0 | 0–1 | 0–2 | | 0–1 |
| Zebbug | 0–2 | 0–2 | 2–0 | 3–2 | 1–0 | 2–0 | 2–0 | 0–1 | 0–0 | 0–1 | 0–3 | |

Legend: Blue = home team win; Yellow = draw; Red = away team win.
