= 2000–01 Maltese Second Division =

Maltese Second Division
- Season: 2000–01
- Champions: Mqabba
- Promoted: Mqabba; Balzan Youths
- Relegated: Santa Lucia; Siggiewi
- Goals scored: 337
- Average goals/game: 2.55

The 2000–01 Maltese Second Division (known as Rothmans Second Division 2000-01 due to sponsorship reasons) started on 16 September 2000 and ended on 14 May 2000. In this season the number of participants was dropped from 13 to 12. Gzira United and Zebbug Rangers were relegated from the First Division, while Balzan Youths and Luqa St. Andrews were promoted from the Third. The league was won by Mqabba and Balzan Youths finished as runners-up. Both were promoted to the 2001–02 Maltese First Division. This were two straight promotions for Balzan Youths. Santa Lucia and Siggiewi were relegated to the Maltese Third Division.

== Participating teams ==
- Attard
- Balzan
- Dingli
- Gzira
- Luqa
- Melita
- Mellieha
- Mqabba
- Siggiew
- Santa Lucia
- Santa Venera
- Zebbug

== Changes from previous season ==
- Marsaxlokk and Qormi were promoted to the First Division. They were replaced with Gzira United and Zebbug Rangers, both relegated from First Division 1999-00.
- St. Georges, Pembroke Athleta and Ghaxaq were relegated to the Third Division. They were replaced with only 2 teams as the number of participants was dropped from 13 to 12. These were Balzan Youths, champions of Third Division, and Luqa St. Andrews, winners of play-offs.

== Final standings ==
| Pos | Team | Pld | W | D | L | GF | GA | GD | Pts | Promotion or relegation |
|---|---|---|---|---|---|---|---|---|---|---|
| 1 | Mqabba (C) | 22 | 14 | 6 | 2 | 31 | 12 | +19 | 48 | Champions and promotion to 2001–02 Maltese First Division |
| 2 | Balzan Youths | 22 | 12 | 8 | 2 | 41 | 12 | +29 | 44 | Promotion to 2001–02 Maltese First Division |
| 3 | Zebbug Rangers | 22 | 12 | 7 | 3 | 26 | 14 | +12 | 43 | |
| 4 | Santa Venera Lightning | 22 | 9 | 6 | 7 | 40 | 29 | +11 | 33 | |
| 5 | Mellieha | 22 | 8 | 8 | 6 | 29 | 27 | +2 | 32 | |
| 6 | Luqa St.Andrews | 22 | 8 | 5 | 9 | 32 | 40 | −8 | 29 | |
| 7 | Dingli Swallows | 22 | 6 | 9 | 7 | 25 | 25 | 0 | 27 | |
| 8 | Gzira United | 22 | 7 | 6 | 9 | 28 | 29 | −1 | 27 | |
| 9 | Melita | 22 | 6 | 7 | 9 | 26 | 30 | −4 | 25 | |
| 10 | Attard | 22 | 4 | 9 | 9 | 23 | 33 | −10 | 21 | |
| 11 | Santa Lucia (R) | 22 | 4 | 6 | 12 | 21 | 39 | −18 | 18 | Relegation to 2001–02 Maltese Third Division |
| 12 | Siggiewi (R) | 22 | 0 | 7 | 15 | 15 | 47 | −32 | 7 | Relegation to 2001–02 Maltese Third Division |

(C) Champions; (R) Relegated
