= 2002–03 Maltese First Division =

Maltese First Division
- Season: 2002–03
- Champions: Msida Saint-Joseph
- Promoted: Msida Saint-Joseph; Balzan Youths
- Relegated: Gozo; Xgħajra Tornados
- Goals scored: 270
- Average goals/game: 3
- Top goalscorer: Daniel Nwoke (20)

The 2002–03 Maltese First Division season started on 7 September 2002 and finished on 4 May 2003. Naxxar Lions and Lija Athletic were relegated from Maltese Premier League. Msida Saint-Joseph and Senglea Athletic were promoted from Maltese Second Division.

Msida Saint-Joseph won the 2001 Championship and a year later they won the 2002 Championship; three consecutive promotions to get in the top level. Gozo and Xgħajra Tornados were relegated to Maltese Second Division. Msida Saint-Joseph won the 2003 Championship and Balzan Youths were promoted to Maltese Premier League.

== Participating teams ==
The Maltese First Division 2002–03 was made up of these teams:

- Balzan Youths
- Gozo
- Lija Athletic
- Mqabba
- Msida Saint-Joseph
- Naxxar Lions
- Rabat Ajax
- Senglea Athletic
- St. Patrick
- Xgħajra Tornados

== Changes from previous season ==
- Marsaxlokk and Mosta were promoted from the First Division to the Premier League. They were replaced by Naxxar Lions and Lija Athletic, both relegated from 2001–02 Maltese Premier League.
- Qormi and St. Andrews were relegated to the 2002–03 Maltese Second Division. They were replaced with Msida Saint-Joseph, champions of 2001–02 Maltese Second Division and Senglea Athletic, runner-up.

== Final league table ==
Pos	Team	Pld	W	D	L	GF	GA	GD	Pts	Promotion or relegation
1	Msida Saint-Joseph (C)	18	11	3	4	45	20	+25	36	Promotion to 2003–04 Maltese Premier League
2	Balzan	18	9	6	3	29	18	+11	33	Promotion to 2003–04 Maltese Premier League
3	Senglea Athletic	18	9	4	5	21	19	+2	31	
4	Rabat Ajax	18	8	2	8	33	30	+3	26	
5	Lija Athletic	18	6	6	6	21	24	−3	24	
6	St. Patrick	18	6	5	7	29	25	+4	23	
7	Naxxar Lions	18	6	4	8	23	32	−9	22	
8	Mqabba	18	4	9	5	25	29	−4	21	
9	Gozo (R)	18	4	5	9	26	34	−8	17	Relegation to 2003–04 Maltese Second Division
10	Xgħajra Tornados (R)	18	2	6	10	18	39	−21	12	Relegation to 2003–04 Maltese Second Division

(C) Champions; (R) Relegated

== Results ==
For a complete set of results, see 1

== Top scorers ==
As of 4 May 2003

Rank	Player	Club	Goals
1	(Nigeria) Daniel Nwoke	Msida Saint-Joseph	20
2	(Malta) William Borg	Rabat Ajax	14
3	(Nigeria) Victor Egere	Gozo	13
3	(Nigeria) Ikechukwu Chibueze	Mqabba	13
5	(Malta) Jeremy Agius	Msida Saint-Joseph	11
