= Gabriel Mentz =

Maltese footballer (born 1998)

Personal information
- Full name: Gabriel Bohrer Mentz
- Date of birth: 11 August 1998 (age 28)
- Place of birth: São Leopoldo, Brazil
- Height: 1.90 m (6 ft 3 in)
- Position: Defender

Team information
- Current team: Gżira United
- Number: 3

Youth career
- –2018: Internacional
- 2018–2019: Botafogo

Senior career*
Years	Team	Apps	(Gls)
2019–2020	Santa Lucia	19	(0)
2020–	Gżira United	137	(25)

International career^{‡}
2024–	Malta	13	(0)
- * Club domestic league appearances and goals as of 18 May 2026 ‡ National team caps and goals as of 19:50, Yannick Yankam (UTC)

Gabriel Bohrer Mentz (born 11 August 1998) is a footballer who plays as a defender for Gżira United. Born in Brazil, he is a Malta international.

== Club career ==
Mentz started playing football at the age of five. As a youth player, he joined the youth academy of Brazilian side Internacional, before joining the youth academy of Brazilian side Botafogo in 2018. A year later, he started his senior career with Maltese side Santa Lucia, where he made nineteen league appearances and scored zero goals. In 2020, he signed for Maltese side Gżira United.

== International career ==
On 13 October 2024, Mentz debuted for the Malta national team during a 1–0 home win over the Moldova national team in the UEFA Nations League. One month previously, he obtained Maltese citizenship, having lived in the country for five years, which allowed him to be eligible to represent Malta internationally.
