= Darren Abdilla =

Maltese footballer

Personal information
- Full name: Darren Abdilla
- Date of birth: July 10, 1979 (age 47)
- Place of birth: Attard, Malta

Team information
- Current team: Gżira United (Head coach)

Managerial career
- Years: Team
- 2007–2008: B'Bugia FC (Head Coach)
- 2008–2010: Floriana FC (Academy Head Coach)
- 2010–2011: Vittoriosa FC (Assistant Head Coach)
- 2011–2012: M'Xlokk FC (Assistant Head Coach)
- 2012–2014: Hibernians FC (Academy Head Coach)
- 2014: Valletta FC (Assistant Head Coach)
- 2014–2019: Gzira United (Head Coach)
- 2019–2020: Valletta FC (Head Coach)
- 2020–2024: Gzira United (Head Coach)
- 2024–2025: Floriana FC (Head Coach)
- 2025–: Gzira United (Head Coach)

Darren Abdilla (born July 10, 1979) is a Maltese professional football manager who currently serves as the manager of Gzira United in the Maltese Premier League.

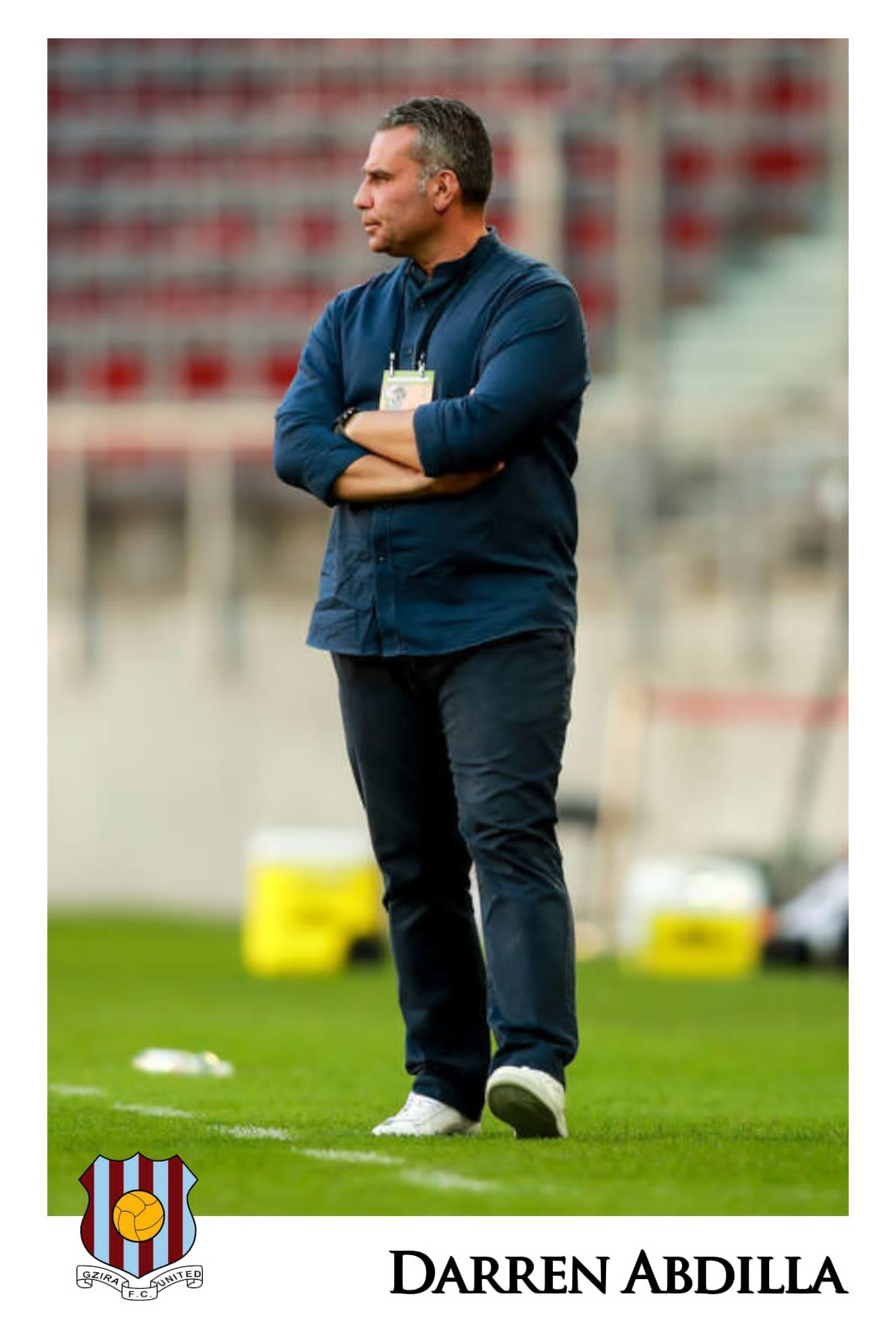
Darren Abdilla

== Managerial career ==
=== Early career ===
Darren Abdilla's journey in football management began in 2003, a pivotal turning point in his career due to a persistent back injury that led him to shift from being a player to a coach. He commenced his coaching journey as an assistant coach at St Georges FC, where he worked closely with Edward Darmanin. After two fruitful seasons with the Blues, both coaches transitioned to B'Bugia FC. During the 2006/2007 season, Darren took on the role of one of the regional coaches within the Malta Football Association.

In the 2007/2008 season, Darren embraced his first role as head coach, taking charge of B'Bugia FC. He went on to spend two productive years as the Nursery Head Coach with Floriana and then managed senior teams at Vittoriosa FC, M'Xlokk FC, and Ghaxaq FC. Subsequently, he spent two additional years as the Nursery Head Coach with Hibernians FC. June 2014 marked a significant moment in Darren's career as he joined the Maltese champions, Valletta FC, in the capacity of an assistant coach under the guidance of the legendary Maltese player Gilbert Agius. During his tenure at Valletta FC, the team faced Qarabag FC in the UEFA Champions League. Unfortunately, in November of the same year, Darren had to step down due to changes in the coaching staff.

=== Gzira United ===
Darren Abdilla's managerial journey led him to Gzira United on November 14, 2014, where he assumed the role of head coach in the first division. During that season, the club participated in a promotional decider against Mosta FC, which they ultimately lost. However, in the 2015/2016 season, Gzira United achieved remarkable success, becoming champions of the Maltese First Division and earning promotion to the Maltese Premier Division without suffering a single defeat.

In Gzira United's first appearance in the Premier League after a 34-year hiatus, Darren initially served as an assistant coach under the newly appointed head coach Branko Nisevic. However, in November 2016, he took over as the head coach, steering the team to a commendable 7th-place finish.

As of the 2017/2018 season, Darren Abdilla embarked on his fourth season with Gzira United, further solidifying his reputation as a dedicated and skilled football manager. Under Darren Abdilla's leadership, Gzira United achieved remarkable success during the 2017/2018 season. The team secured a historic 3rd-place finish, earning them a coveted spot in the UEFA Europa League, marking the club's return to European competition after an astonishing 34-year hiatus.

The 2018/2019 season commenced with European commitments against Andorra's Santa Julia, and Abdilla's team delivered impressive performances, securing victories in both legs. However, in the second round, they faced a formidable challenge, taking on the Serbian Super Liga side, Radnicki Nis, ultimately being eliminated.

While the season started on a positive note with the team remaining unbeaten in the first seven games, challenges emerged as key players succumbed to injuries. In February 2019, Darren Abdilla made the difficult decision to resign from his position as head coach. He took responsibility for a string of disappointing results, which left the club in 3rd place in the league with nine matches remaining and in the last 16 of the cup.

Darren Abdilla's tenure at Gzira United marked a significant period in the club's history, as he not only guided them back to European competitions but also left an indelible mark on the team's performance.

=== Valletta FC ===
In June 2019, Darren Abdilla was appointed as the head coach of Valletta, the renown Maltese champions. His time with Valletta was marked by several specific achievements and various professional challenges.

Under his leadership, Valletta embarked on a European journey, beginning with a clash against Luxembourg's F91 Dudelange in the 1st round of the UEFA Champions League. Remarkably, Valletta managed to advance past Dudelange, securing a place to face the renowned team of Ferencvaros. Although they were eventually eliminated from the competition, their European commitments continued as they faced Astana of Kazakhstan.

One of the major highlights of Darren Abdilla's tenure at Valletta occurred in December 2019 when the team clinched the Maltese Super Cup by defeating Balzan in the final. This victory marked his first major trophy as a coach and was celebrated as a significant milestone in his career.

Throughout the season, the team continued to perform well, and Valletta was in a commanding position in the league, holding the top spot. They had also advanced to the last 16 of the Maltese Cup.

However, in an unexpected turn of events, the club management decided to terminate Darren Abdilla's contract following a defeat against arch-rivals B'Kara. At the time of his departure, Valletta was leading the league and in the last 16 of the Maltese Cup.

=== Gzira United – 2nd Spell ===
Darren Abdilla's return to lead Gzira United marked the end of a turbulent period for the club. In the preceding season, the team had gone through a series of coaching changes and failed to qualify for any European competitions. Abdilla, however, took charge and immediately set about rebuilding the squad, making some notable signings. One of the standout additions was the Maltese international defender, Steve Borg, who had recently been named Footballer of the Year.

The 2020/2021 season was cut short due to the COVID-19 pandemic, with only seven matches remaining. At that point, Gzira United found themselves in a promising third place in the league and had reached the last 16 of the cup, ensuring their participation in European competition for the upcoming season.

The following season, 2021/2022, proved to be a challenging one due to a series of long-term injuries that plagued the team. Despite these setbacks, Gzira United displayed resilience and managed to secure their spot in European competitions with a crucial victory in the final game against the newly crowned champions, Hibernians.

The 2022/2023 season saw the club reach the third qualifying round of the UEFA Europa Conference League. During this campaign, Abdilla’s team eliminated Atlètic d’Escaldes in the first round and Radnički Niš in the second round, before being eliminated by the Austrian club Wolfsberger.

In the domestic league, Gzira maintained their position in second place for the majority of the season, only slipping in the final games after encountering a rough patch. Additionally, the team fell short in the cup competition, losing to Marsaxlokk in the semi-final in a penalty shootout. Despite these challenges, the club's progress in European competitions and their consistent performance in the league demonstrated the positive direction under Darren Abdilla's leadership.

Darren Abdilla's 2023/2024 season as the head coach of Gżira United started on a high note. Under his guidance, the team achieved significant success in the UEFA Europa Conference League. They managed to eliminate Glentoran in a dramatic penalty shootout and subsequently defeated Luxembourg's Dudelange with an aggregate score of 3–2. These victories propelled Gżira United into the third qualifying round of the tournament for the second consecutive year under Abdilla's leadership.

However, the third qualifying round proved challenging for the team. Gżira United faced Viktoria Plzen from the Czech Republic and suffered a defeat with an aggregate score of 6–0, resulting in their exit from the competition.

In the domestic league, Gżira United's performance was less successful during this season. The team struggled to gain momentum, managing to secure only 11 points from their first 12 games. This was a stark contrast to their European campaign and indicated challenges in the league matches.

Despite the early success in European competitions, the team's overall performance led to a significant decision by Abdilla. Following the team's victory against Fgura United in the round of 32 of a domestic competition, Darren Abdilla made the decision to resign from his position as the Head Coach of Gżira United. This marked the end of his tenure with the club, concluding a chapter that saw both highs and lows during the 2023/2024 season.

=== Floriana FC ===
On May 20, 2024, Darren Abdilla was appointed as the head coach of Floriana FC, one of Malta's premier football clubs. The first competitive game under Abdilla's charge was in the UEFA Conference League, where Floriana FC faced San Marino's Tre Penne in the 1st Qualifying round. Under Abdilla's leadership, the team emerged victorious, defeating Tre Penne 4–2 on aggregate. However, the team's journey in the competition ended in the second round, where they were eliminated by the Portuguese side Vitória SC, with a 5–0 aggregate score.

The 2024–25 Maltese Premier League season introduced a new format, split into Opening and Closing rounds. Floriana impressed during the Opening Round, topping the table with 35 points from 16 matches, having recorded 10 wins, 5 draws, and only 1 defeat. Their attacking play stood out, with 27 goals scored, 9 clean sheets and just 10 conceded during this phase.

Over the full campaign, which included both the Opening and Closing rounds, Floriana finished with 18 wins, 12 draws, and only 4 losses. Their consistency saw them score 52 goals and concede just 23 across 34 matches, ultimately finishing third overall in the league standings and securing qualification to the UEFA Europa Conference League. Notably, the team enjoyed a remarkable 12-match unbeaten streak, the longest of any side that season, and kept a league-high 18 clean sheets. Despite their final placing, Floriana ended the season with the highest points tally in the league, earning 62 points—four ahead of Sliema Wanderers, six more than Birkirkara, and ten clear of champions Ħamrun Spartans, who had gained automatic entry to the Final Four due to their Closing Round win.

Darren Abdilla's tenure ended as he and the club mutually agreed to part ways.

Darren Abdilla was personally recognised for his achievements throughout the campaign. He won the VBET Coach of the Month award twice during the season and was nominated for Best Coach at the MFPA Awards. He also finished second in the MFCA Awards, and his accomplishments were crowned with the prestigious Coach of the Year award from the Malta Football Association (MFA), cementing his status as one of the most respected Maltese managers of his generation.

=== Gzira United – 3rd Spell ===
On September 29, 2025, Abdilla returned as head coach of Gżira United.

In his return debut, Gżira United won a seven-goal thriller match (4–3) over Mosta.

== Managerial statistics ==
As of match played May 31, 2025

Managerial record by team and tenure in Maltese League and Cups
| Team | From | To | Record | | | | |
| Team | From | To | P | W | D | L | Win % |
|---|---|---|---|---|---|---|---|
| Gzira United | November 14, 2014 | February 12, 2019 | 131 | 74 | 26 | 31 | 56.49 |
| Valletta FC | June 1, 2019 | February 18, 2020 | 21 | 13 | 5 | 3 | 61.90 |
| Gzira United | June 1, 2020 | January 17, 2024 | 98 | 50 | 22 | 26 | 51.02 |
| Floriana FC | June 1, 2024 | May 15, 2025 | 38 | 23 | 10 | 5 | 60.53 |
| Total | | | 288 | 160 | 63 | 65 | 55.56 |

Managerial record by team and tenure in European Competitions
| Team | Season | Competition | Opponents | Record | | | |
| Team | Season | Competition | Opponents | P | W | D | L |
|---|---|---|---|---|---|---|---|
| Gzira United | 2018/2019 | UEFA Europa League | Santa Julia (Andorra) – Radnički (Serbia) | 4 | 2 | 0 | 2 |
| Valletta FC | 2019/2020 | UEFA Champions League | Dudelange 91 (Luxembourg) – Ferencvaros (Hungary) | 4 | 0 | 3 | 1 |
| Valletta FC | 2019/2020 | UEFA Europa League | Astana (Kazakhstan) | 2 | 0 | 0 | 2 |
| Gzira United | 2021/2022 | UEFA Conference League | Santa Julia (Andorra) – Rijeka (Croatia) | 4 | 0 | 2 | 2 |
| Gzira United | 2022/2023 | UEFA Conference League | Inter D'Escaldes (Andorra) – Radnički (Serbia) – Wolfsberger (Austria) | 6 | 0 | 5 | 1 |
| Gzira United | 2023/2024 | UEFA Conference League | Glentoran (N.Ireland) – Dudelange (Luxembourg) – Viktoria Plzen (Czechia) | 6 | 1 | 2 | 3 |
| Floriana FC | 2024/2025 | UEFA Conference League | Tre Penne (San Marino) – Vitoria Guimarães (Portugal) | 4 | 1 | 1 | 2 |

== Honours ==
=== Managerial ===
- Maltese First Division: 2015/2016
- MFA Coach of the Year: 2018
- Maltese Super Cup: 2019/2020
- MFA Coach of the Year: 2025
