= Tipbet =

Malta-based gambling company

Tipbet Ltd.
- Company type: Private company
- Website type: Online betting & gaming
- Available in: English, German, Turkish, Greek, Macedonian, Croatian, Bulgarian
- Headquarters: Gżira, Malta
- Employees: 100+
- Website: www.tipbet.com

Tipbet is a Malta-based gambling company. Its headquarters are in Gzira and the company has grown significantly since its inception in 1995. With a business heavily focused on the online market, there are also fully branded physical betting shops that are run by franchisers. The land-based operation has been active for 20 years in Germany.

Tipbet offers odds on all major sporting events around the world and are licensed by the Malta Gaming Authority (MGA/CL2/1119) since 2014; as well as hosting a wide variety of casino games with regular promotions. New additions to their offering include eSports betting.

Based in the hub of the Mediterranean on the island of Malta, the office hosts various departments of the Tipbet operation.

== Sponsorship ==
Tipbet previously had a sponsorship agreement with football club SV Werder Bremen of the Bundesliga. This deal was valid for the 2016/17 season.

The company are currently Premium Partners of Fortuna Düsseldorf. Similarly, Tipbet's local side, Gzira United FC, wear the company's logo on their shirt.

Away from football, Tipbet was the Official Betting and Premium Sponsor of the easyCredit Basketball Bundesliga, which involved a major advertising and marketing agreement.

Tipbet successfully participated in the Excellence in iGaming in Berlin and ICE in London conferences, whilst the SiGMA closing party in Malta on 18 November 2016 was sponsored by the company.

For the 2015/2016 season Tipbet was the official Betting Partner for Bayer Leverkusen of the Bundesliga.

== Live Casino ==
Tipbet released a major update to their website in April 2017 which included the release of a cash-out feature, virtual sports, and a Live Casino.

The Live Casino is powered by major providers including NetEnt and has full mobile device functionality.

== eSports ==
In 2016, Tipbet entered the esports market by sponsoring the AD Finem team.[1]

In addition, an agreement has been reached that allows Tipbet to stream ESL eSports events.

== Free live streaming ==
To differentiate from other leading betting companies, Tipbet offers free streams of sporting events to their customers. By registering, users are able to access streams from around the world without having to deposit money or place a bet. This is complemented by live statistics.

== Security ==
The online services of Tipbet are licensed and regulated by the Malta Gaming Authority (license numbers: MGA/CL2/1119/2015 and MGA/CL1/1149/2015), Tipbet's website also includes SSL encryption for personal data and transactions.

TipBet is also using its MGA license to target markets where specific regulation is now into place.

== Regulatory Intervention ==
On 20 May 2024 the Malta Gaming Authority cancelled the licence issued to Tipbet and ordered the operator to suspend all gaming operations and to cease using any reference to the Malta Gaming Authority on its online properties. The MGA order was backdated to 28 November 2023.
