= Abdelrahman Kuku =

Sudanese footballer

Personal information
- Date of birth: 26 October 1998 (age 28)
- Place of birth: Cairo, Egypt
- Height: 1.93 m (6 ft 4 in)
- Position: Defender

Team information
- Current team: Al Nasr SC (Kuwait)
- Number: 6

Youth career
- Western Sydney Wanderers FC Youth

Senior career*
Years	Team	Apps	(Gls)
2015–2018	Western Sydney Wanderers II	15	(1)
2018–2019	EFSC Titans	36	(4)
2020	Seattle Redhawks	13	(0)
2021–2022	FGCU Eagles	22	(0)
2023–2024	Green Gully	24	(0)
2024	Al-Merrikh	0	(0)
2024–2025	Al-Ittihad Club (Tripoli)	8	(0)
2026	Tarxien Rainbows	13	(0)
2026-	Al Nasr SC (Kuwait)		

International career^{‡}
2024–	Sudan	15	(0)
- * Club domestic league appearances and goals as of 4 May 2026 ‡ National team caps and goals as of 12 November 2026

Abdelrahman Kuku (Arabic: عبدالرحمن كوكو, 26 October 1998) is a Sudanese Australian professional footballer who plays as a defender for Maltese side Tarxien Rainbows.

== Career ==
Kuku was born in Cairo to Sudanese parents. In 2004, his family immigrated to Wakeley, New South Wales, Australia, west of the capital, Sydney. His sporting career began with the amateur club Hinchinbrook True Blues in 2014 and then to the youth club Western Sydney Wanderers FC.

He studied there until high school, then received a full athletic scholarship from Eastern Florida State College in 2018, where he was the team captain and a two-year starter being named 2019 NJCAA First Team All-American as well as receiving the Region 8 Player of the Year award. 2020 he was recruited by NCAA D1 school Seattle University before transferring to Florida Gulf Coast University to continue playing the remainder of 2021 and 2022 season where he obtained a Bachelor of Applied Science in 2022. After obtaining his bachelor's degree, he returned to Australia in February 2023, where he joined Green Gully SC, a second-tier club in Australia. On 11 December 2023, he renewed his contract with the club for an additional season.

In March 2024, he was called up to the Sudan national football team roster for the first time, along with his teammate Mohamed Adam. He participated in Guinea Bissau's two friendly matches within the FIFA window in March 2024 in Morocco.

Al-Merrikh SC agreed with him for two seasons, provided that he joins the team after completing Sudan's matches against Mauritania and South Sudan in the FIFA World Cup qualification in June 2024. On September 6th 2024, he joined Libyan giants Al-Ittihad Club (Tripoli) on a 2 year contract.
