= Jean Pierre Mifsud Triganza =

Maltese footballer

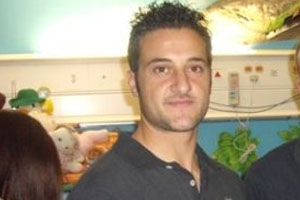

Personal information
- Date of birth: 20 November 1981 (age 44)
- Place of birth: Msida, Malta
- Position: Striker

Team information
- Current team: Msida Saint-Joseph
- Number: 9

Senior career*
Years	Team	Apps	(Gls)
2000–2004	Floriana	31	(8)
2000–2002	→ Msida Saint-Joseph (loan)		(24)
2004–2009	Birkirkara	121	(52)
2009–2012	Sliema Wanderers	58	(28)
2012–2013	Birkirkara	46	(14)
2013–2016	Valletta	38	(7)
2014–2015	→ Balzan (loan)	25	(8)
2016–2017	Hamrun Spartans	12	(4)
2017	Mosta	12	(2)
2017–2020	Pembroke Athleta	55	(33)
2020-2021	Marsaxlokk	9	(5)
2021-2022	Żabbar St. Patrick F.C.	14	(18)
2022–	Msida Saint-Joseph	17	(15)

International career
- Malta U17
- Malta U21
2008	Malta	1	(0)
- * Club domestic league appearances and goals as of 00:35, 8 December 2019 (UTC)

Jean Pierre Mifsud Triganza (born 20 November 1981 in Msida, Malta) is a professional footballer who plays for Msida Saint-Joseph as a striker.

== Playing career ==
Mifsud Triganza began his career with Floriana and was promoted to the first team during the 2000–01 season. He made two appearances early in the season, but did achieve a 50% strike rate, after scoring a goal in a 1–1 draw against Naxxar Lions.

Following two seasons on loan with Msida St. Joseph, Mifsud Triganza returned to Floriana, and started to establish himself as a first team regular, making 17 appearances and scoring four goals during the 2002–03 season, as Floriana narrowly avoided relegation, finishing 2nd in the relegation group, and thereby 8th in the overall league table. He began the 2003–04 season, hoping to force his way into a regular starting slot for Floriana. He made 12 appearances and scored three goals, but following some impressive performances he was signed by Birkirkara.

=== Msida Saint-Joseph ===
In spite of getting two games for Floriana early in 2000–01, it was clear Mifsud Triganza would need to be loaned out in order to gain first team experience. Mifsud Triganza spent the rest of the season on loan with Third Division club Msida Saint-Joseph, helping them to promotion. In just ten games, he managed to score 17 goals.

Mifsud Triganza was again loaned to Msida Saint-Joseph for the 2001–02 season. The season finished on a high for him as Msida Saint-Joseph won the Maltese Second Division title by eight clear points, with Mifsud Triganza scoring an impressive 24 goals to help the team's cause.

=== Birkirkara ===
Mifsud Triganza moved from Floriana to Birkirkara during the January transfer window of 2004. He went on to make nine appearances and scored four goals for Birkirkara during 2003–04 season, as his new side finished in 2nd place in the Maltese Premier League.

The 2004–05 season, was Mifsud Triganza's first full season with Birkirkara, Mifsud Triganza continued to show promise in front of goal, notching 12 goals in 21 appearances, as Birkirkara recorded their second consecutive 2nd-place finish in the Maltese Premier League and won the U*Bet FA Trophy.

The 2005–06 season, was the finest for Mifsud Triganza during his time with Birkirkara, Mifsud Triganza made 20 appearances and scored eight goals, as Birkirkara won the Maltese Premier League title, for the first time in six seasons.

Mifsud Triganza went into the 2006–07 season, hoping to emulate the success of the previous, however Birkirkara managed a third-place finish in the Maltese Premier League, with him again making 20 appearances, but scoring 11 goals.

For the 2007–08 season, Mifsud Triganza was again in the goals, scoring another 11 goal and making 25 appearances, as Birkirkara again finishing in third place in the Maltese Premier League. Despite the league finish, he was again a winner of the Maltese Cup.

Mifsud Triganza hoped to achieve a higher league position for the 2008–09 season, however Birkirkara again managed to finish in 3rd position for the third consecutive season, with Mifsud Triganza making 25 appearances and scoring eight goals. On 19 November 2008, he made his debut for Malta in the 0–1 defeat against Iceland.

=== Sliema Wanderers ===
In June 2009, he left Birkirkara and joined fellow Maltese Premier League team Sliema Wanderers. He made his Premier League debut for Sliema Wanderers on 30 August 2009 in a 1–0 defeat to Qormi.

Mifsud Triganza scored his first Premier League goal for Sliema Wanderers on 17 October 2009, and went on to score a hat trick in a 5–0 victory over Ħamrun Spartans. Birkirkara later on resigned Mifsud Triganza and assisted Demba Toure in a goal vs Hibernians FC. Mifsud Triganza left Birkirkara for Rivals Valletta.

== Honours ==
Msida Saint-Joseph

- 2001–02 Maltese Second Division

Birkirkara

- 2005–06 Maltese Premier League
- 2005, 2008 Maltese Cup

Valletta

- 2013–14 Maltese Premier League

== Career statistics ==
Statistics accurate as of match played 1 August 2013.

Club performance			League		Cup		League Cup		Continental		Total	
Season	Club	League	Apps	Goals	Apps	Goals	Apps	Goals	Apps	Goals	Apps	Goals
Malta			League		Maltese Cup		League Cup		Europe		Total	
2000–01	Floriana	Maltese Premier League	2	1	0	0	0	0	0	0	2	1
2001–02	Msida Saint-Joseph (loan)	Maltese Second Division		24	0	0	0	0	0	0		24
2002–03	Floriana	Maltese Premier League	17	4	0	0	0	0	0	0	17	4
2003–04	Floriana	Maltese Premier League	12	3	0	0	0	0	0	0	12	3
2003–04	Birkirkara	Maltese Premier League	9	4	0	0	0	0	0	0	9	4
2004–05	Birkirkara	Maltese Premier League	21	12	0	0	0	0	0	0	21	12
2005–06	Birkirkara	Maltese Premier League	20	8	0	0	0	0	0	0	20	8
2006–07	Birkirkara	Maltese Premier League	20	11	0	0	0	0	2	0	22	11
2007–08	Birkirkara	Maltese Premier League	25	11	0	0	0	0	0	0	25	11
2008–09	Birkirkara	Maltese Premier League	25	8	0	0	0	0	2	0	27	8
2009–10	Sliema Wanderers	Maltese Premier League	26	13	0	0	0	0	2	0	28	13
2010–11	Sliema Wanderers	Maltese Premier League	21	13	1	2	0	0	2	0	24	15
2011–12	Sliema Wanderers	Maltese Premier League	11	2	1	0	0	0	0	0	12	2
2011–12	Birkirkara	Maltese Premier League	12	4	0	0	0	0	0	0	12	4
2012–13	Birkirkara	Maltese Premier League	32	10	1	0	0	0	2	1	35	12
Total	Malta		254	126	4	2	0	0	10	1	268	129
Career total			254	126	4	2	0	0	10	1	268	129
