= Hamed Koné =

Ivorian footballer

Personal information
- Full name: Ben Hamed Koné
- Date of birth: 2 November 1987 (age 39)
- Place of birth: Abidjan, Ivory Coast
- Height: 1.68 m (5 ft 6 in)
- Position: Attacking midfielder

Team information
- Current team: Gżira United
- Number: 21

Youth career
- 2004–2005: JMG Academy

Senior career*
Years	Team	Apps	(Gls)
2005–2009	Chonburi	16	(6)
2007	→ Home United (loan)	23	(10)
2008	→ Gainare Tottori (loan)	26	(6)
2009–2011	Gainare Tottori	31	(10)
2012–2013	Slavia Sofia	0	(0)
2014–2015	Academica Argeş	37	(6)
2015–2016	Voluntari	30	(5)
2016	Dibba Al-Fujairah	3	(1)
2017	Nuorese	11	(1)
2018	Feronikeli	13	(12)
2018	Neuchâtel Xamax	6	(0)
2019	Feronikeli	5	(0)
2019–	Gżira United	11	(4)
- * Club domestic league appearances and goals as of 21:53, 19 July 2019 (UTC)

Ben Hamed Koné (born 2 November 1987) is an Ivorian professional footballer who plays as an attacking midfielder for Maltese club Gżira United.

== Club career ==
=== Feronikeli ===
On 30 January 2018, Koné joined Football Superleague of Kosovo side Feronikeli and he played 13 games for the club, 10 as starter before leaving in May of the following year.

=== Neuchâtel Xamax ===
On 7 June 2018, Koné signed Swiss Super League side Neuchâtel Xamax. On 11 June 2018, the club confirmed that Koné had joined on a permanent transfer. On 21 July 2018, he made his debut in a 0–2 away win against Luzern after being named in the starting line-up.

=== Return to Feronikeli ===
On 30 January 2019, Koné returned to Football Superleague of Kosovo side Feronikeli.

=== Gżira United ===
On 25 June 2019, Koné moved to Maltese Premier League side Gżira United. On 18 July 2019, Koné scored twice in a Europa League qualifier against Hajduk Split, his first goals for the club.
