= Kristian Keqi =

Albanian footballer

Personal information
- Date of birth: 28 July 1996 (age 30)
- Place of birth: Florence, Italy
- Height: 1.78 m (5 ft 10 in)
- Position: Attacking midfielder

Team information
- Current team: Żabbar St. Patrick
- Number: 30

Youth career
- –2015: Scandicci
- 2014–2018: → Pescara (loan)

Senior career*
Years	Team	Apps	(Gls)
2015	Potenza	1	(0)
2015–2016	Foligno	27	(3)
2016	Monterosi	4	(0)
2016–2017	Scandicci	12	(0)
2017–2018	Sangiovannese	38	(5)
2018–2019	Arezzo	4	(0)
2019–2022	Floriana	71	(28)
2022–2023	Marsaxlokk	18	(3)
2023–2024	Aquila Montevarchi	12	(2)
2024–	Żabbar St. Patrick	18	(3)
- * Club domestic league appearances and goals as of 26 June 2025

Kristian Keqi (born 28 July 1996) is an Albanian professional footballer who plays as an attacking midfielder for Maltese Premier League club Żabbar St. Patrick.
