= Amadou Samb =

Senegalese footballer

Personal information
- Date of birth: 22 April 1988 (age 38)
- Place of birth: Thiès, Senegal
- Height: 1.87 m (6 ft 2 in)
- Position: Forward

Team information
- Current team: Gżira United
- Number: 77

Youth career
- Forza e Costanza

Senior career*
Years	Team	Apps	(Gls)
- Forza e Costanza
2008–2011	Monza	53	(13)
2011–2013	Chievo	0	(0)
2011–2012	→ Cremonese (loan)	10	(0)
2012–2013	→ Lumezzane (loan)	19	(2)
2014–2017	Verona	0	(0)
2014	→ KF Teuta (loan)	13	(4)
2014–2015	→ Floriana (loan)	12	(6)
2015–2016	→ KF Teuta (loan)	15	(4)
2016–2017	→ Floriana (loan)	23	(5)
2017–2021	Gżira United	57	(39)
- * Club domestic league appearances and goals as of 15 October 2021

Amadou Samb (born 22 April 1988) is a Senegalese footballer who plays for Gżira United in the Maltese Premier League.

== Club career ==
Samb was signed by professional club Monza in October 2008, after the court of Treviglio upheld the appeal from Monza for the decision of Italian Football Federation (FIGC). FIGC restricted Italian clubs from signing non-EU player, in although it also has some allowance, one of them is, a non-EU senior players who purely a youth product of Italian clubs can also be registered. Before formally signed by Monza, he also played for amateur side Forza e Costanza, which was in Promozione (7th highest level of the pyramid). He also played for Monza in friendly before the bureaucratic clearance.

Samb played 45 games in Lega Pro Prima Divisione (3rd highest level of the pyramid), for Monza in the first two seasons. He also won Berretti youth league as overage player. He missed few months in 2010–11 season due to injury, just played 8 times for Monza (2 in cup).

On 29 January 2011 signed by Serie A club Chievo. He wore no.9 shirt. After the end of the season, he signed the loan contract for U.S. Cremonese, team of Lega Pro Prima Divisione. Before he left the club, he picked no.14 shirt for 2011–12 Serie A. In the 2012–13 season he signed the loan contract for Lumezzane. On 30 June 2013 Samb was released by Chievo in order to make the team have a non-EU registration quota from abroad.

In January 2014 he was signed by cross-town rival Hellas Verona, who were also in Serie A, but was immediately sent out to Albanian club KF Teuta Durrës for the remainder of the 2013–14 season on loan. He scored on his debut on 2 February against KS Lushnja in a 6–2 victory.

On 30 August 2014 he joined Floriana.
