= Peter Pullicino =

Maltese footballer

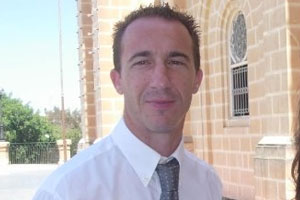

Personal information
- Full name: Peter William Pullicino
- Date of birth: 17 June 1976 (age 50)
- Place of birth: Sydney, Australia
- Height: 1.70 m (5 ft 7 in)
- Position: Midfielder

Senior career*
| Years | Team | Apps | (Gls) |
| 1997–2000 | Eastern Suburbs | | |
| 2000 | Sutherland Sharks | | |
| 2000 | Fraser Park | | |
| 2001–2006 | Hibernians | 115 | (5) |
| 2006–2007 | Msida Saint-Joseph | 14 | (1) |
| 2007–2010 | Marsaxlokk | 57 | (4) |

International career^{‡}
| 2004–2008 | Malta | 22 | (0) |

Managerial career
- 2010–2012: Marsaxlokk (assistant manager)
- 2017: Birkirkara
- * Club domestic league appearances and goals as of 15 August 2009 ‡ National team caps and goals as of 15 August 2009

Peter William Pullicino (born 17 June 1976) is an Australian-born Maltese former professional footballer who last played for Marsaxlokk. Born in Australia, he represented the Malta national team.

== Honours ==
=== Hibernians ===
Winner

- 2001–02 Maltese Premier League
- 2006 Maltese Cup

=== Marsaxlokk ===
Winner

- 2006–07 Maltese Premier League
- 2009–10 Maltese First Division

== Career statistics ==
Statistics accurate as of match played 1 August 2009.

| Club performance | | | League | | Cup | | League Cup | | Continental | | Total | |
| Season | Club | League | Apps | Goals | Apps | Goals | Apps | Goals | Apps | Goals | Apps | Goals |
| Malta | | | League | | Maltese Cup | | League Cup | | Europe | | Total | |
|---|---|---|---|---|---|---|---|---|---|---|---|---|
| 1997 | Eastern Suburbs | N/A | | | 0 | 0 | 0 | 0 | 0 | 0 | | |
| 1998 | Eastern Suburbs | N/A | | | 0 | 0 | 0 | 0 | 0 | 0 | | |
| 1999 | Eastern Suburbs | N/A | | | 0 | 0 | 0 | 0 | 0 | 0 | | |
| 2000 | Sutherland Sharks | N/A | | | 0 | 0 | 0 | 0 | 0 | 0 | | |
| 2000 | Fraser Park | N/A | | | 0 | 0 | 0 | 0 | 0 | 0 | | |
| Total | Australia | | | | 0 | 0 | 0 | 0 | 0 | 0 | | |
| 2001–02 | Hibernians | Maltese Premier League | 26 | 3 | 0 | 0 | 0 | 0 | 0 | 0 | 26 | 3 |
| 2002–03 | Hibernians | Maltese Premier League | 19 | 0 | 0 | 0 | 0 | 0 | 0 | 0 | 19 | 0 |
| 2003–04 | Hibernians | Maltese Premier League | 22 | 0 | 0 | 0 | 0 | 0 | 0 | 0 | 22 | 0 |
| 2004–05 | Hibernians | Maltese Premier League | 27 | 2 | 0 | 0 | 0 | 0 | 0 | 0 | 27 | 2 |
| 2005–06 | Hibernians | Maltese Premier League | 21 | 0 | 0 | 0 | 0 | 0 | 0 | 0 | 21 | 0 |
| 2006–07 | Msida Saint-Joseph | Maltese Premier League | 14 | 1 | 0 | 0 | 0 | 0 | 0 | 0 | 14 | 1 |
| 2006–07 | Marsaxlokk | Maltese Premier League | 10 | 0 | 0 | 0 | 0 | 0 | 0 | 0 | 10 | 0 |
| 2007–08 | Marsaxlokk | Maltese Premier League | 25 | 2 | 0 | 0 | 0 | 0 | 0 | 0 | 25 | 2 |
| 2008–09 | Marsaxlokk | Maltese Premier League | 22 | 2 | 0 | 0 | 0 | 0 | 0 | 0 | 22 | 2 |
| 2009–10 | Marsaxlokk | Maltese First Division | 0 | 0 | 0 | 0 | 0 | 0 | 0 | 0 | 0 | 0 |
| Total | Malta | | 186 | 10 | 0 | 0 | 0 | 0 | 0 | 0 | 186 | 10 |
| Career total | | | 186 | 10 | 0 | 0 | 0 | 0 | 0 | 0 | 186 | 10 |
