= Gżira United F.C. =

Maltese football club

Gżira United
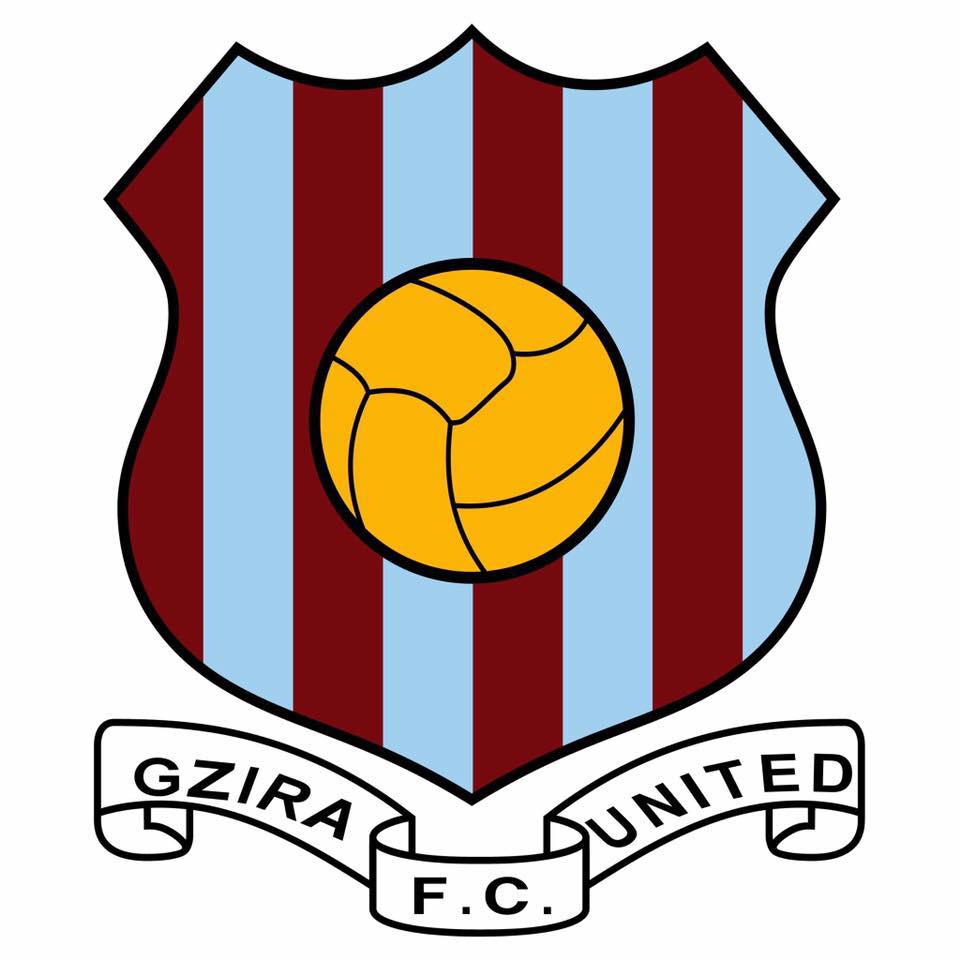
- Full name: Gżira United Football Club
- Nickname: Maroons
- Founded: 1947; 79 years ago
- Ground: Centenary Stadium
- Capacity: 3,000
- Chairman: Sharlon Pace
- Manager: Darren Abdilla
- League: Maltese Premier League
- 2025–26: Maltese Premier League, 6th of 14
Home colours	Away colours

Gżira United Football Club is a Maltese professional football club from the small harbor town of Gżira in central Malta, which currently plays in the Maltese Premier League.

== History ==
The club was founded in 1947, won the FA Trophy in 1973 and became the First Division league champions. They often play in Maroon with light blue sleeves on the shirt, with white shorts and white socks. Following the club's promotion to the Maltese Premier League, they signed a sponsorship agreement with JEEP, the global SUV brand, with the agreement of organizing events for the local community. For the 2016–17 season the Club played in BOV Premier League for the first time ever and finished 7th place. In the following year 2017–18 the maroons placed 3rd place and participated for the first time in the UEFA Europa League. The 2018–19 season was another successful one where again Gżira placed 3rd place and assured themselves to play again in the Europa League for another time.

=== The Hajduk miracle ===
On 18 July 2019, Gżira were facing the big Croatian club Hajduk Split at Split for the second leg of the first qualifying round of the 2019–20 UEFA Europa League. Gżira had lost the first leg match at home 0–2, a result which was considered normal, due to the big budget differences between the two clubs. The match in Split had the Croatians as strong favorites, offering odds of 1/15 (1.07 in decimal odds) for Hajduk to win the match. Hajduk went at half time winning 1–0. However, Brazilian forward Jefferson equalized for Gżira at the 57th minute, and Hamed Koné scored at the 69th minute making the score 1–2 for Gżira. This result was still not enough for the Maltese side, but found a final goal in the sixth and last minute of injury time, again with Hamed Koné, making the score 1–3 for Gżira, with the Maltese side advancing on away goals rule. This result was considered a major shock for the Croatians, with their manager Siniša Oreščanin being sacked shortly after.

=== Qualifying for the UEFA Conference League 3rd Round ===
In season 2021/22 UEFA started a new competition, the UEFA Conference League. Gzira qualified after placing 3rd in the Maltese Premier League and in the first round they eliminated again Santa Julia of Andorra. In the second round they faced Rijeka of Croatia and were eliminated with an aggregate of 3–0. In season 2022/23 Gzira played again in the same competition and in the first round they eliminated Atletic Club Escaldes of Andorra. In the second round Gzira FC were drawn against Radnicki Nis of Serbia and Gzira shocked again the European football when eliminating this strong side from Serbia. For the first time Gzira United FC played in the 3rd round of a European Competition and played against Austrian giants of Wolfsberger. Gzira obtained a goalless draw in Austria but then they were eliminated in the home match.

== Futsal ==
Gżira United also had a futsal team, which participated in Malta's top futsal league until 2024. The 2023–24 season was the last edition of the Enemed Futsal League in which Gżira United Santa Margerita Futsal participated, finishing at 11th place and thus qualified for the Enemed Challenger League.

Previously, under the name Gżira FC, they finished 8th out of 9 clubs in the 2014–15 season. That season, after winning 7–4 again Naxxar in the first round, they reached the quarter-final of the domestic cup, where Balzan Futsal defeated them 12–1.

== Players ==
=== Current squad ===
As of 19 August 2026

Note: Flags indicate national team as defined under FIFA eligibility rules; some limited exceptions apply. Players may hold more than one non-FIFA nationality.

No.	Pos.	Nation	Player
1	GK	MLT	Karl Sargent
2	DF	KOS	Albion Pllana
3	DF	MLT	Gabriel Mentz
4	DF	MLT	Nathan Joyce
5	DF	MLT	Deacon Abela
6	MF	MLT	Andy Borg
7	FW	BRA	Luisinho
8	MF	MLT	Brooklyn Borg
9	FW	BRA	Andre Costa
10	FW	BRA	Maxuell Samurai
11	MF	MLT	Dejan Farrugia
14	FW	MLT	Justin Serna

No.	Pos.	Nation	Player
17	MF	MLT	Antiago De Flavia
19	MF	MLT	Aidan Previ
22	DF	ESP	Marc Van De Bovenkamp
23	FW	GNB	Dinis Djadjo
27	DF	POR	Filipe Maio
28	MF	MLT	Neil Cassar
29	DF	MLT	Aidan Previ
30	MF	MLT	David Xuereb
32	MF	ARG	Jonathan Farías
33	GK	SMR	Edoardo Colombo
44	DF	POR	Saldanha
77	MF	MLT	Kayden Pace

=== Notable players ===
- (Brazil) Caio Garcia
- (Mali) Souleymane Diamouténé
- (Nigeria) Haruna Garba
- (Malta) Andrew Cohen
- (Malta) Roderick Briffa
- (Malta) Justin Haber
- (Ivory Coast) Hamed Kone
- (Senegal) Amadou Samb
- (Brazil) Rodolfo Soares
- (Brazil) Robert de Pinho de Souza
- (Brazil) Jefferson De Assis

== Executive Board ==
Chairman Sharlon Pace

Vice Chairman Roberto Cristiano

Chief Executive Officer Edward Zammit Tabona

General Secretary Dr Ian Micallef

Chief Financial Officer Alexander Cassar

== Personnel ==
=== Technical staff ===
Position	Staff
Manager	(Malta) Darren Abdilla
Assistant Manager	(Malta) Matthew Mizzi
Team Manager	(Malta) Marlon Galea
Goalkeeper Trainer	(Malta) Malcolm Vella
Physical trainer	(Malta) Mark Abela
Doctor	(Malta) Dr. Pierre Sammut
Physiotherapist	(Malta) Jermoe Delia
Physiotherapist	(Malta) Francesco Gambin
Kit manager	(Malta) Jason Micallef
Kit manager	(Malta) Karl Spiteri

== Honours ==
=== League ===
- Maltese First Division (2nd Level)
  - Winners (2): 1963–64, 2015–16
- Maltese Second Division (3rd Level)
  - Winners (4): 1985–86, 1993–94, 1998–99, 2011–12
- Maltese Third Division (4th Level)
  - Winners (1): 2008–09

=== Cup ===
- Maltese FA Trophy
  - Winners (1): 1972–73
- First Division Knock Out Cup (2nd Level)
  - Winners (4): 1956–57, 1965–66, 1967–68, 1976–77
- Second/Third Division Knock Out Cup (3rd Level)
  - Winners (1): 1998–99
- Second Division Sons of Malta Cup (3rd Level)
  - Winners (2): 1968–69, 1977–78
- Third Division Sons of Malta Cup (4th Level)
  - Winners (1): 1979–80

== European record ==
Season	Competition	Round	Opponent	Home	Away	Aggregate
1973–74	European Cup Winners' Cup	1R	(Norway) Brann	0–2	0–7	0–9
2018–19	UEFA Europa League	PR	(Andorra) Sant Julià	2–1	2–0	4–1
2018–19	UEFA Europa League	1Q	(Serbia) Radnički Niš	0–1	0–4	0–5
2019–20	UEFA Europa League	1Q	(Croatia) Hajduk Split	0–2	3–1	3–3 (a)
2019–20	UEFA Europa League	2Q	(Latvia) Ventspils	2–2	0–4	2–6
2021–22	UEFA Europa Conference League	1Q	(Andorra) Sant Julià	1–1 (a.e.t.)	0–0	1–1 (5–3 p)
2021–22	UEFA Europa Conference League	2Q	(Croatia) Rijeka	0–2	0–1	0–3
2022–23	UEFA Europa Conference League	1Q	(Andorra) Atlètic Club d'Escaldes	1–1	1–0 (a.e.t.)	2–1
2022–23	UEFA Europa Conference League	2Q	(Serbia) Radnički Niš	2–2	3–3 (a.e.t.)	5–5 (3–1 p)
2022–23	UEFA Europa Conference League	3Q	(Austria) Wolfsberger AC	0–4	0–0	0–4
2023–24	UEFA Europa Conference League	1Q	(Northern Ireland) Glentoran	2–2	1–1 (a.e.t.)	3–3 (14–13 p)
2023–24	UEFA Europa Conference League	2Q	(Luxembourg) F91 Dudelange	2–0	1–2	3–2
2023–24	UEFA Europa Conference League	3Q	(Czech Republic) Viktoria Plzeň	0–2	0–4	0–6
