= Tarxien Rainbows F.C. =

Association football club in Malta

Tarxien Rainbows
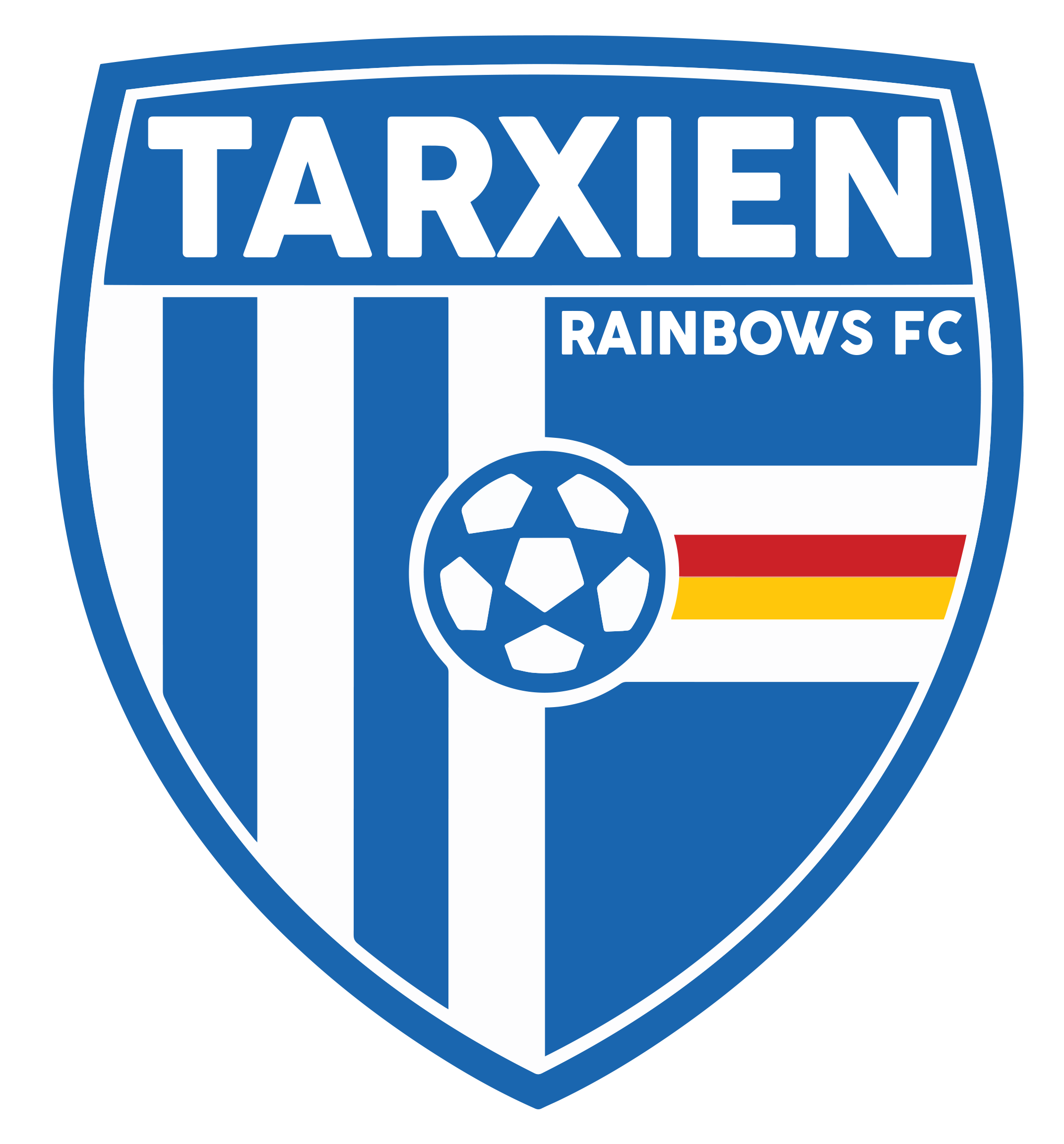
- Full name: Tarxien Rainbows Football Club
- Nicknames: The Rainbows, Tarxien, The Blues
- Founded: April 1934; 92 years ago, as Rainbows Tarxien
- Ground: Tony Cassar Sports Ground, Tarxien, Malta
- Capacity: 1,000
- Chairman: Anthony Cassar
- Manager: Jacques Scerri
- League: Maltese Challenge League
- 2024–25: Maltese Challenge League, 2nd of 16 (promoted)
Home colours	Away colours

Tarxien Rainbows Football Club is a professional football club from Tarxien, Malta. They have achieved promotion to the Maltese Premier League in 2025.

== History ==
The club was founded as Rainbows Tarxien in April 1934 and participated in all the divisions of Maltese football. They have been in the top flight 3 times, with the longest spell starting from the 2008–2009 season. The club was promoted to the best division after finishing as champions in the Maltese First Division in 2007–08. In 2008–09 the club finished level on points with fellow strugglers Ħamrun Spartans and Msida St. Joseph. Ħamrun had the worst head-to-head record and were relegated, while Tarxien Rainbows managed to avoid relegation with a playoff-win over Msida St. Joseph. In 2009–10 the season was different for the Rainbows as they managed to place fifth in the table and proceeded to the semi-finals of both domestic cup competitions that the club played.

In the 2009–10 season, Tarxien Rainbows placed fifth in the championship pool above rivals Hibernians. The team won the derby three times in a row making it a historical season. Tarxien went on to reach the semi-final of the F.A. Trophy and the 100th Anniversary Cup.

In the 2010–11 season, Tarxien Rainbows finished in fifth place in the championship pool. The club ended the First Round in second place. In the same season they reached the semi-final of the U*BET FA Trophy. In the 2011–12 season, Tarxien Rainbows avoided relegation with a few games remaining before the end of the season.

== Futsal ==
Tarxien Rainbows F.C. fielded a futsal team that competed in the Maltese Futsal League until 2019.

== Players ==
=== Current squad ===
As of 23 March, 2026

Note: Flags indicate national team as defined under FIFA eligibility rules; some limited exceptions apply. Players may hold more than one non-FIFA nationality.

No.	Pos.	Nation	Player
1	GK	MLT	Andrea Cassar
4	DF	MLT	Miguel D'Alessandro
6	DF	SDN	Abdelrahman Kuku
7	MF	PAN	Ángel Valverde
8	MF	BRA	Wesley Hudson
9	FW	NGR	Anthony Lokosa
10	FW	BRA	Cláudio Murici
11	FW	BRA	Érico Júnior
15	DF	MLT	Timothy Desira
18	DF	MLT	Sheldon Mizzi
20	MF	MLT	Luke Anthony Borg
21	MF	MLT	Kian Vella

No.	Pos.	Nation	Player
22	FW	SSD	Manny Aguek
23	DF	BRA	Nhayson
27	DF	COL	Yerson Mosquera
29	MF	GHA	Kwasi Donsu
33	MF	CRO	Marko Musulin
54	DF	SRB	Petar Panić
70	FW	AUT	Patrick Schmidt
74	DF	MLT	Andreas Vella
77	MF	MLT	Marcus Grima
88	DF	MLT	Kyle Gatt
94	GK	MLT	Miguel Spiteri
95	GK	POL	Aleksander Łubik

== Historical list of coaches/managers ==
- (Malta) Joe Galea (1996 – 1998)
- (Malta) Jesmond Zerafa (2007 – 2008)
- (Malta) Noel Coleiro (2008 – October 26, 2011)
- (Malta) Patrick Curmi (October 16, 2011 – May 16, 2012)
- (Serbia) Danilo Dončić (May 31 – August 27, 2012)
- (Malta) Clive Mizzi (August 27, 2012 – June 9, 2015)
- (Malta) Jacques Scerri (June 2015 – October 2016)
- (Malta) Kevin Vella (November 2016)
- (Malta) Jesmond Zerafa (1 December 2016 – March 29, 2017)
- (Malta) Brian Testaferrata (Mar 29 – June 27, 2017)
- (Malta) Jose Borg (July 1, 2017 – Jul 29, 2019)
- (Serbia) Marko Glumac (July 29 – November 12, 2019)
- (Malta) Demis Paul Scerri (December 2019 – May 21, 2020)
- (Malta) Winston Muscat (July 2020 – February 15, 2021)
- (Malta) Steve D'Amato (February 18, 2021 – May 31, 2022)
- (Malta) Ivan Casha (June 1 – 30, 2022)
- (Malta) Jacques Scerri (September 13, 2022 – present)
