= 2014–15 Valletta F.C. season =

Maltese football team season

Valletta
2014–15 season
- Manager: Gilbert Agius, Ivan Zammit
- Premier League: 2nd
- FA Trophy: Semi-final
- Euro Challenge Cup: Winners
- Super Cup: Runners-up
- UEFA Champions League: Second Qualifying Round
- Top goalscorer: League: Lateef Elford-Alliyu (13); All: Lateef Elford-Alliyu (15)

The 2014–15 season saw Valletta finish second in the Maltese Premier League and reach the semi-finals of the Maltese FA Trophy, as well as winning their sixth Euro Challenge Cup title. They had qualified for the UEFA Champions League as winners of the 2013–14 season.

== Pre-season - Euro Challenge Cup ==
Valletta won the 2014 edition of the Euro Challenge Cup, gaining a 1–1 draw with Birkirkara before comfortably beating Sliema Wanderers with a 4–2 win. Valletta's final match finished with a 2-1 win over Hibernians. Valletta topped the table on seven points, followed by Sliema on six, Hibernians on three, and finally Birkirkara finishing with just the solitary point.

Match	Date	Opponent	Venue	Result	Scorers	Report
1	20 June 2014	Birkirkara	Centenary Stadium	1–1	Nafti 15'	Report
2	22 June 2014	Sliema Wanderers	Centenary Stadium	4–2	Nafti, Elford-Alliyu (2), Montebello	Report
3	25 June 2014	Hibernians	Centenary Stadium	2–1	Nafti (2) 24', 87'	Report

== UEFA Champions League ==
=== Second qualifying round ===
15 July 2014 1st leg	Valletta (Malta)	0–1	Qarabağ (Azerbaijan)	Ta' Qali, Malta
	Briffa (yellow card) 71'; R. Camilleri (red card) 84'; Faria (yellow card) 90+2'	Report	Chumbinho 18'; Almeida (penalty missed) 85'	Stadium: National Stadium, Ta' Qali; Attendance: 1,200; Referee: Adrien Jaccottet (Switzerland)

22 July 2014 2nd leg	Qarabağ (Azerbaijan)	4–0	Valletta (Malta)	Baku, Azerbaijan
	Reynaldo 15'; Chumbinho 48'; Danilo Dias 57'; George (yellow card) 73', (goal) 80'	Report	J. Caruana (red card) 19'; Bajada (yellow card) 19'; Dimech (yellow card) 60'; Faria (yellow card) 73'; Fenech (yellow card) 81' (yellow-red card) 84'	Stadium: Tofiq Bahramov Republican Stadium; Attendance: 23,350; Referee: Sergey Tsinkevich (Belarus)

Qarabağ won 5–0 on aggregate.

== BOV Super Cup ==
Date	Opponent	Venue	Result	Scorers	Report
8 August 2014	Birkirkara	National Stadium	1–2	J. Caruana 57'	Report

== BOV Premier League ==
=== First phase ===
==== Results ====
Match	Date	Opponent	Venue	Result	Attendance	Scorers	Report
1	17 August 2014	Mosta	National Stadium	0–1	1,350		Report
2	23 August 2014	Tarxien Rainbows	Victor Tedesco Stadium	0–0	768		Report
3	26 August 2014	Floriana	National Stadium	2–0	1,891	Elford-Alliyu 65', Nafti 85'	Report
4	14 September 2014	Hibernians	National Stadium	1–2	2,088	Kooh Sohna 90+2'	Report
5	21 September 2014	Sliema Wanderers	National Stadium	5–0	1,026	Zahra (2) 18', 23', Alex Terra (2) 24', 54', Fenech 39' (pen)	Report
6	27 September 2014	Qormi	National Stadium	4–0	936	Elford-Alliyu 31', Alex Terra 63', Azzopardi 86', Montebello 90'	Report
7	2 October 2014	Pietà Hotspurs	National Stadium	1–2	1,005	Barry 60'	Report
8	19 October 2014	Birkirkara	National Stadium	0–2	2,583		Report
9	26 October 2014	Naxxar Lions	Victor Tedesco Stadium	2–0		Kooh Sohna 40', Bajada 90+2'	Report
10	1 November 2014	Balzan	Victor Tedesco Stadium	2–0	756	Briffa 34', Fenech 85'	Report
11	8 November 2014	Żebbuġ Rangers	Victor Tedesco Stadium	2–0	695	Barry 21', Nafti 54'	Report
12	23 November 2014	Mosta	National Stadium	5–0	1,172	Bajada 14', Briffa 33', Elford-Alliyu 38', Nafti 71', Montebello 89'	Report
13	29 November 2014	Tarxien Rainbows	Hibernians Stadium	6–0	651	Nafti 14', Barry (2) 39' (pen), 74', Elford-Alliyu (2) 52', 87', Kooh Sohna 88'	Report
14	6 December 2014	Floriana	National Stadium	4–1	1,760	Elford-Alliyu (3) 2', 41', 60', Nafti 45'	Report
15	14 December 2014	Hibernians	National Stadium	1–3	3,250	Eflord-Alliyu 22'	Report
16	21 December 2014	Sliema Wanderers	National Stadium	3–1	1,053	Cremona 4', Barry (2) 20', 55'	Report
17	3 January 2015	Qormi	National Stadium	3–2	966	Barry (2) 67', 76' (pen), Azzopardi 81'	Report
18	10 January 2015	Pietà Hotspurs	Hibernians Stadium	3–0	708	Barry (2) 39', 45', Montebello 82'	Report
19	17 January 2015	Żebbuġ Rangers	Hibernians Stadium	2–0	842	Nafti 41', Elford-Alliyu 76'	Report
20	25 January 2015	Naxxar Lions	Victor Tedesco Stadium	3–0		Leeflang 46', Elford-Alliyu (2) 83', 86'	Report
21	1 February 2015	Balzan	National Stadium	1–2	1,127	Fenech 26'	Report
22	8 February 2015	Birkirkara	National Stadium	1–1	1,801	Briffa 90'	Report

==== League table ====
Pos	Team	Pld	W	D	L	GF	GA	GD	Pts
1	Hibernians	22	19	3	0	68	13	+55	60
2	Valletta	22	14	2	6	51	17	+34	44
3	Birkirkara	22	13	4	5	41	22	+19	43
4	Balzan	22	9	7	6	35	33	+2	34
5	Floriana	22	7	8	7	38	41	−3	29
6	Sliema Wanderers	22	7	6	9	26	31	−5	27
7	Mosta	22	7	4	11	24	43	−19	25
8	Naxxar Lions	22	5	7	10	26	34	−8	22
9	Tarxien Rainbows	22	4	9	9	22	38	−16	21
10	Pietà Hotspurs	22	5	6	11	19	36	−17	21
11	Qormi	22	4	6	12	22	38	−16	18
12	Żebbuġ Rangers	22	4	6	12	25	51	−26	18

Source: MFA
Rules for classification: 1) Points; 2) Play-offs (only if needed to decide champions, teams for relegation or teams for UEFA competitions).

=== Second phase ===
==== Results ====
Match	Date	Opponent	Venue	Result	Attendance	Scorers	Report
23	21 February 2015	Żebbuġ Rangers	Hibernians Stadium	2–3		Fenech 60', K. Borg 83'	Report
24	1 March 2015	Qormi	National Stadium	3–1	1,038	Briffa (2) 9', 45', S. Borg 24'	Report
25	8 March 2015	Tarxien Rainbows	National Stadium	4–0	814	Cremona 24', Nafti (2) 29', 37', Azzopardi 90'	Report
26	14 March 2015	Pietà Hotspurs	Victor Tedesco Stadium	2–1	667	Nafti (2) 54', 72'	Report
27	19 March 2015	Mosta	National Stadium	3–1	744	Hilary 28', Cremona 65', Barry 84'	Report
28	6 April 2015	Naxxar Lions	National Stadium	1–0	690	Nafti 90+3'	Report
29	12 April 2015	Floriana	National Stadium	1–0		Dimech 2'	Report
30	17 April 2015	Sliema Wanderers	National Stadium	3–3	765	Nafti 5', R. Camilleri 45+2', Briffa 68'	Report
31	25 April 2015	Birkirkara	National Stadium	2–1		S. Borg 17', Barry 81'	Report
32	2 May 2015	Balzan	National Stadium	1–0	683	Elford-Alliyu 66'	Report
33	9 May 2015	Hibernians	National Stadium	1–3	3,890	Bajada 82'	Report

==== Final league table ====
Pos	Team	Pld	W	D	L	GF	GA	GD	Pts	Qualification or relegation
1	Hibernians (C)	33	27	5	1	97	24	+73	56	Qualification for the 2015–16 UEFA Champions League
2	Valletta	33	22	3	8	74	30	+44	47	Qualification for the 2015–16 UEFA Europa League
3	Birkirkara	33	19	7	7	59	31	+28	43	Qualification for the 2015–16 UEFA Europa League
4	Balzan	33	17	8	8	59	45	+14	42	Qualification for the 2015–16 UEFA Europa League
5	Floriana	33	13	11	9	58	51	+7	36	
6	Sliema Wanderers	33	10	9	14	50	56	−6	26	
7	Naxxar Lions	33	9	9	15	40	51	−11	25	
8	Qormi	33	8	9	16	40	55	−15	24	
9	Tarxien Rainbows	33	8	9	16	35	60	−25	23	
10	Mosta (O)	33	9	6	18	38	72	−34	21	Qualification for the Relegation Play-Offs
11	Pietà Hotspurs (R)	33	6	8	19	30	58	−28	16	Relegation to the 2015–16 Maltese First Division
12	Żebbuġ Rangers (R)	33	5	6	22	37	84	−47	12	Relegation to the 2015–16 Maltese First Division

Source: MFA
Rules for classification: 1) points; 2) play-off (only for deciding champion and UEFA competition places).
(C) Champions; (O) Play-off winners; (R) Relegated

== FA Trophy ==
Round	Date	Opponent	Venue	Result	Attendance	Scorers	Report
R3	2 December 2014	Birżebbuġa	Victor Tedesco Stadium	7–1		Fenech 7', Kooh Sohna 12', Montebello (3) 15', 18', 73', Faria 80', C. Caruana 90'	Report
R4	20 January 2015	Melita	Victor Tedesco Stadium	2–0		S. Borg 69', Bajada 72'	Report
Quarter-final	13 February 2015	Mosta	National Stadium	3–1		Bajada 30', Elford-Alliyu (2) 52', 60'	Report
Semi-final	16 May 2015	Birkirkara	National Stadium	0–1	2,205		Report

== Squad statistics ==
=== First Team ===
Pos.	Name	Premier League		FA Trophy		UEFA Champions League		BOV Super Cup		Total		Discipline	
Pos.	Name	Apps	Goals	Apps	Goals	Apps	Goals	Apps	Goals	Apps	Goals	Yellow card	Red card
GK	(Malta) Manuel Bartolo	0	0	0	0	0	0	0	0	0	0	0	0
GK	(Malta) Ryan Caruana	0	0	0	0	0	0	0	0	0	0	0	0
GK	(Malta) Yenz Cini	0	0	1	0	0	0	1	0	2	0	0	0
GK	(Italy) Pietro Marino	9	0	2	0	0	0	0	0	11	0	2	1
GK	(Malta) Nicky Vella	24(1)	0	1	0	2	0	0	0	27(1)	0	1	0
DF	(United Arab Emirates) Hamid Al Kamali	0(5)	0	0(1)	0	0(1)	0	0	0	0(7)	0	0	0
DF	(Malta) Ian Azzopardi	30(1)	3	3	0	2	0	1	0	36(1)	3	3	0
DF	(Malta) Jean Borg	0(2)	0	0(1)	0	0	0	0	0	0(3)	0	0	0
DF	(Malta) Steve Borg	26	2	3	1	0	0	0	0	29	3	6	0
DF	(Malta) Leon Camilleri	0	0	0	0	0	0	0	0	0	0	0	0
DF	(Malta) Ryan Camilleri	29(1)	1	4	0	1	0	1	0	35(1)	1	5	1
DF	(Malta) Jonathan Caruana	27	0	0(1)	0	2	0	1	1	30(1)	1	1	2
DF	(Malta) Luke Dimech	20(10)	1	4	0	2	0	1	0	27(10)	1	13	0
DF	(Malta) Tristan Nappa Licari	0	0	0	0	0	0	0	0	0	0	0	0
DF	(Malta) Mirco Vella	0	0	0	0	0	0	0	0	0	0	0	0
MF	(Malta) Siraj Arab	0	0	0	0	0(1)	0	0	0	0(1)	0	0	0
MF	(Malta) Shaun Bajada	19(7)	3	3(1)	2	2	0	1	0	25(8)	5	3	0
MF	(The Gambia) Hamza Barry	26(2)	12	4	0	0	0	0	0	30(2)	12	2	0
MF	(Malta) Roderick Briffa	27(1)	6	3	0	2	0	0	0	32(1)	6	7	0
MF	(Malta) Joshua Buttigieg	0	0	0	0	0	0	0	0	0	0	0	0
MF	(Malta) Daniel Camilleri	0(2)	0	0	0	0	0	0	0	0(2)	0	0	0
MF	(Malta) Christian Caruana	1(4)	0	0(2)	1	0	0	0	0	1(6)	1	1	0
MF	(Malta) Stefan Cassar	0	0	0(1)	0	0	0	0	0	0(1)	0	0	0
MF	(Malta) Llywelyn Cremona	13(14)	3	3(1)	0	0	0	0	0	16(15)	3	4	0
MF	(Malta) Kurt Drakard	0	0	0	0	0	0	0	0	0	0	0	0
MF	(Portugal) Hugo Faria	9(3)	0	1	1	2	0	1	0	13(3)	1	6	1
MF	(Malta) Ryan Fenech	28(1)	4	4	1	2	0	1	0	35(1)	5	13	2
MF	(Nigeria) Ikenna Hilary	6(4)	1	1	0	0	0	0	0	7(4)	1	2	0
MF	(Malta) Ian Montanaro	0(1)	0	0	0	0	0	0	0	0(1)	0	0	0
MF	(Tunisia) Abdelkarim Nafti	29(2)	12	3	0	2	0	1	0	35(2)	12	5	0
MF	(Malta) Nicholas Pulis	0(1)	0	0	0	0	0	0	0	0(1)	0	0	0
MF	(Montenegro) Vladimir Savićević	0(2)	0	0	0	0	0	0	0	0(2)	0	0	0
MF	(Malta) Jurgen Suda	0(1)	0	0	0	0	0	0	0	0(1)	0	0	0
MF	(Malta) Dario Tabone	0(1)	0	0	0	0	0	0	0	0(1)	0	0	0
MF	(Australia) Adrian Zahra	3(1)	2	0	0	0	0	1	0	4(1)	2	0	0
FW	(Malta) Kurt Borg	0(4)	1	0(1)	0	0	0	0	0	0(5)	1	0	0
FW	(England) Lateef Elford-Alliyu	19(7)	13	1(2)	2	2	0	1	0	23(9)	15	0	0
FW	(Cameroon) Raphael Alain Kooh Sohna	6(4)	3	1	1	0(2)	0	0(1)	0	7(7)	4	2	0
FW	(Netherlands) Djamel Leeflang	3(4)	1	0(1)	0	0	0	0	0	3(5)	1	0	0
FW	(Malta) Luke Montebello	4(7)	3	2	3	0(1)	0	0(1)	0	6(9)	6	0	0
FW	(Brazil) Alex Terra	4(2)	3	0	0	0	0	0	0	4(2)	3	0	0
FW	(Malta) Ian Zammit	0(3)	0	0	0	1(1)	0	0(1)	0	1(5)	0	0	0

== Transfers ==
=== In ===
Date	Pos.	Name	From	Fee	Ref.
23 May 2014	GK	(Malta) Nicky Vella	(Malta) Tarxien Rainbows	Free	
12 June 2014	MF	(Australia) Adrian Zahra	(Australia) Perth Glory	Free	
17 June 2014	DF	(Malta) Ryan Camilleri	(Malta) Hibernians	Free	
10 July 2014	MF	(Portugal) Hugo Faria	(Greece) Kalloni	Free	
10 July 2014	DF	(United Arab Emirates) Hamid Al Kamali	(United Arab Emirates) Al-Wahda	Free	
10 July 2014	FW	(Cameroon) Raphael Alain Kooh Sohna	(Malta) Pietà Hotspurs	Free	
28 July 2014	MF	(Malta) Christian Caruana	(Malta) Floriana	Free	
30 August 2014	MF	(Brazil) Lico	Unattached	Free	
1 September 2014	FW	(Brazil) Alex Terra	Unattached	Free	
4 January 2015	GK	(Italy) Pietro Marino	Unattached	Free	
22 January 2015	MF	(Montenegro) Vladimir Savićević	(Montenegro) FK Mladost Podgorica	Free	
22 January 2015	MF	(Nigeria) Ikenna Hilary	(Portugal) Camacha	Free	
22 January 2015	FW	(Netherlands) Djamel Leeflang	Unattached	Free	

=== Out ===
Date	Pos.	Name	To	Fee	Ref.
21 June 2014	MF	(Malta) Edmond Agius	(Malta) Birkirkara	Free	
14 August 2014	DF	(Malta) Gaetano Gesualdi	(Germany) Weißenfels	Free	
1 October 2014	MF	(Brazil) Lico	Released	Free	
2 December 2014	MF	(Australia) Adrian Zahra	Released	Free	
2 December 2014	FW	(Brazil) Alex Terra	Released	Free	
5 December 2014	FW	(Malta) Ian Zammit	Released	Free	
17 December 2014	MF	(Portugal) Hugo Faria	Released	Free	
17 December 2014	FW	(Cameroon) Raphael Alain Kooh Sohna	Released	Free	
1 April 2015	MF	(Montenegro) Vladimir Savićević	Released	Free	
31 May 2015	GK	(Malta) Ryan Caruana	Released	Free	
31 May 2015	MF	(Malta) Christian Caruana	Released	Free	
31 May 2015	MF	(Malta) Kurt Drakard	Released	Free	
31 May 2015	MF	(Malta) Oznef Cassar	Released	Free	
31 May 2015	FW	(Netherlands) Djamel Leeflang	Released	Free	
31 May 2015	FW	(England) Lateef Elford-Alliyu	Released	Free	
31 May 2015	DF	(Malta) Luke Dimech	Released	Free	
3 June 2014	MF	(Malta) Ryan Fenech	(Malta) Balzan	Free	
3 June 2015	DF	(Malta) Samir Arab	(Malta) Balzan	Free	
12 June 2015	GK	(Malta) Yenz Cini	Released	Free	
12 June 2015	MF	(Nigeria) Ikenna Hilary	Released	Free	
30 June 2015	DF	(Malta) Steve Borg	Released	Free	
30 June 2015	MF	(The Gambia) Hamza Barry	Released	Free	

=== Loan in ===
Date from	Date to	Pos.	Name	From	Ref.
10 July 2014	31 May 2015	DF	(Malta) Jean Borg	(Malta) Attard	

=== Loan out ===
Date from	Date to	Pos.	Name	To	Ref.
28 June 2014	31 May 2015	DF	(Malta) Yessous Camilleri	(Malta) Żebbuġ Rangers	
5 July 2014	31 May 2015	MF	(Malta) Siraj Arab	(Malta) Pembroke Athleta	
10 July 2014	31 May 2015	FW	(Malta) Jean Pierre Mifsud Triganza	(Malta) Balzan	
10 July 2014	31 May 2015	DF	(Malta) Samir Arab	(Malta) Balzan	
10 July 2014	31 May 2015	MF	(Malta) Dyson Falzon	(Malta) Mosta	
10 July 2014	31 May 2015	MF	(Malta) Dylan D'Agostino	(Malta) Senglea Athletic	
15 July 2014	31 May 2015	DF	(Malta) Kenneth Scicluna	(Malta) Vittoriosa Stars	
20 July 2014	31 May 2015	MF	(Malta) David Camilleri	(Malta) St. George's	
20 July 2014	31 May 2015	FW	(Malta) Terence Scerri	(Malta) Senglea Athletic	
20 July 2014	31 May 2015	DF	(Malta) Neil Curmi	(Malta) Marsa	
23 July 2014	15 January 2015	DF	(Malta) Jonathan Francica	(Malta) Lija Athletic	
26 July 2014	31 May 2015	DF	(Malta) Kurt Magro	(Malta) Mosta	
1 August 2014	31 May 2015	MF	(Malta) Cleavon Frendo	(Malta) Lija Athletic	
1 August 2014	31 May 2015	MF	(Malta) Dasser Sammut	(Malta) Qrendi	
5 August 2014	31 May 2015	MF	(Malta) Isaac McCarthy	(Malta) Lija Athletic	
10 August 2014	31 May 2015	MF	(Malta) Bjorn Bondin	(Malta) Qormi	
10 August 2014	31 May 2015	MF	(Malta) Matthew Thorne	(Malta) Pembroke Athleta	
21 August 2014	31 May 2015	MF	(Malta) Rennie Forace	(Malta) Msida St. Joseph	
29 August 2014	31 May 2015	DF	(Malta) Miguel Attard	(Malta) Zurrieq	
1 September 2014	31 May 2015	MF	(Malta) Brandon Grech	(Malta) Mqabba	
1 January 2015	31 May 2015	GK	(Malta) Yenz Cini	(Malta) Gudja United	
1 January 2015	31 May 2015	GK	(Malta) Manuel Bartolo	(Malta) Żebbuġ Rangers	
6 January 2015	12 August 2015	MF	(Malta) Isaac Zammit	(Malta) San Ġwann	
9 January 2015	31 May 2015	MF	(Malta) Glenn Cassar	(Malta) Zurrieq	
28 January 2015	31 May 2015	FW	(Malta) Luke Montebello	(Malta) Żebbuġ Rangers	
