= 2013–14 Valletta F.C. season =

Maltese football team season

Valletta
2013–14 season
- Manager: Mark Miller, André Paus
- Premier League: 1st
- FA Trophy: Winners
- Euro Challenge Cup: Winners
- Gozo Cup: Winners
- UEFA Europa League: Second Qualifying Round
- Top goalscorer: League: Denni (19); All: Denni (22)

The 2013–14 season was Valletta's twenty-second title-winning season in the Maltese Premier League and the 13th as Maltese FA Trophy winners, as well as winning their fifth Euro Challenge Cup title. They had qualified for the UEFA Europa League via their third-place finish in the 2012–13 season.

== Pre-season - Euro Challenge Cup ==
Valletta won the 2013 edition of the Euro Challenge Cup, gaining a 1–1 draw with Hibernians before dispatching Birkirkara with a 1–0 win and finally Sliema Wanderers 3–1. Valletta topped the table on seven points, followed by Hibernians on four, Sliema and Birkirkara on three. Valletta used the tournament to field players who were on loan with other clubs during the previous season, new summer signings and a number of trialists. Dutch striker Harrie Gommans, Nadur Youngsters' Serbian midfielder Miloš Stojanović and Spanish midfielder José Gil Zapata all featured, none of whom went on to sign a permanent contract with the club.

Match	Date	Opponent	Venue	Result	Scorers	Report
1	18 June 2013	Hibernians	Centenary Stadium	1–1	Camilleri 29'	Report
2	22 June 2013	Birkirkara	Centenary Stadium	1–0	Barry 80'	Report
3	25 June 2013	Sliema Wanderers	Centenary Stadium	3–1	Obaje 12', Denni 46' (pen), Bajada 79'	Report

== UEFA Europa League ==
=== First qualifying round ===
4 July 2013 1st leg	La Fiorita (San Marino)	0–3	Valletta (Malta)	Serravalle, San Marino
	F. Rinaldi (yellow card) 29'; Mazzola (yellow card) 36'	Report	Denni (yellow card) 17', (goal) 30' (pen.), 50'; Fenech (yellow card) 45+1'; Camilleri (yellow card) 48'; Barry (yellow card) 58'; Zammit 90+3'	Stadium: Stadio Olimpico; Attendance: 374; Referee: Lorenc Jemini (Albania)

11 July 2013 2nd leg	Valletta (Malta)	1–0	La Fiorita (San Marino)	Ta' Qali, Malta
	Bajada (yellow card) 37'; Vandelannoite (yellow card) 66'; Agius (yellow card) 75'; Zammit 90' (pen.)	Report	F. Rinaldi (yellow card) 44'; Confalone (yellow card) 61'; Ceci (yellow card) 66'; G. Bollini (yellow card) 90'	Stadium: Centenary Stadium; Attendance: 998; Referee: Bryn Markham-Jones (Wales)

Valletta won 4–0 on aggregate.

=== Second qualifying round ===
18 July 2013 1st leg	Valletta (Malta)	1–1	Minsk (Belarus)	Ta' Qali, Malta
	Fenech 45'; Barry (yellow card) 51'; Briffa (yellow card) 86'; Denni (yellow card) 88'	Report	Sachywka 6'; Belevich (yellow card) 29'; Rozhok (yellow card) 72'; Astravukh (yellow card) 78'	Stadium: National Stadium, Ta' Qali; Attendance: 1,104; Referee: Oliver Drachta (Austria)

25 July 2013 2nd leg	Minsk (Belarus)	2–0	Valletta (Malta)	Zhodzina, Belarus
	Vasilyuk 53'; Kibuk 60'; Bukatkin (yellow card) 68'; Sachywka (yellow card) 83'; Rnić (yellow card) 85'	Report	Marino (yellow card) 54'; Caruana (yellow card) 66'; Barry (yellow card) 80'	Stadium: Torpedo Stadium; Attendance: 1,500; Referee: Alexander Kostadinov (Bulgaria)

Minsk won 3–1 on aggregate.

== BOV Premier League ==
=== First phase ===
==== Results ====
Match	Date	Opponent	Venue	Result	Scorers	Report
1	18 August 2013	Mosta	National Stadium	2–1	Denni 31', Camilleri 51'	Report
2	25 August 2013	Hibernians	National Stadium	2–3	Denni 22', Barry 30'	Report
3	31 August 2013	Floriana	National Stadium	3–0	Zammit 46', Corr Nyang 56', Rômulo 77'	Report
4	15 September 2013	Qormi	National Stadium	4–0	Briffa 47', Denni 49', Nafti (2) 57', 87'	Report
5	21 September 2013	Naxxar Lions	Victor Tedesco Stadium	1–0	Caruana 14'	Report
6	29 September 2013	Birkirkara	National Stadium	0–1		Report
7	6 October 2013	Sliema Wanderers	National Stadium	3–0	Fenech 4', Nafti 17', Denni 75'	Report
8	20 October 2013	Vittoriosa Stars	Centenary Stadium	2–1	Denni 71', Mifsud Triganza 89'	Report
9	26 October 2013	Rabat Ajax	Victor Tedesco Stadium	4–1	Denni (2) 12', 63', Agius 83', Nafti 90+3'	Report
10	2 November 2013	Tarxien Rainbows	Centenary Stadium	3–0	Denni (2) 44', 60' Corr Nyang 90'	Report
11	10 November 2013	Balzan	Victor Tedesco Stadium	1–1	Mifsud Triganza 27'	Report
12	24 November 2013	Mosta	Hibernians Stadium	6–0	Caruana 12', Fenech 48', Agius 50', Briffa 54', Denni (2) 57', 73'	Report
13	8 December 2013	Floriana	National Stadium	2–0	Denni 40', Agius 70'	Report
14	11 December 2013	Hibernians	National Stadium	2–1	Briffa 69', Mifsud Triganza 90+1'	Report
15	15 December 2013	Qormi	National Stadium	4–0	Briffa 47', Denni 49', Nafti (2) 57', 87'	Report
16	21 December 2013	Naxxar Lions	Victor Tedesco Stadium	1–2	Fenech 88'	Report
17	4 January 2014	Tarxien Rainbows	Hibernians Stadium	2–1	Denni 2', Nafti 58'	Report
18	12 January 2014	Sliema Wanderers	National Stadium	0–0		Report
19	18 January 2014	Vittoriosa Stars	Hibernians Stadium	4–0	Nafti 26', Agius 28', Denni 78', Corr Nyang 84'	Report
20	26 January 2014	Rabat Ajax	Victor Tedesco Stadium	6–1	Nafti 25', Elford-Alliyu 28', Briffa 49', Agius 57', Mifsud Triganza (2) 62', 69'	Report
21	2 February 2014	Birkirkara	National Stadium	2–1	Fenech 13', Barry 63'	Report
22	8 February 2014	Balzan	Victor Tedesco Stadium	1–0	Corr Nyang 84'	Report

==== League table ====
Pos	Team	Pld	W	D	L	GF	GA	GD	Pts	Qualification
1	Birkirkara	22	18	2	2	51	19	+32	56	Qualification for the Top Six
2	Valletta	22	17	2	3	51	13	+38	53	Qualification for the Top Six
3	Hibernians	22	15	2	5	57	27	+30	47	Qualification for the Top Six
4	Sliema Wanderers	22	12	7	3	43	24	+19	43	Qualification for the Top Six
5	Mosta	22	12	2	8	44	35	+9	38	Qualification for the Top Six
6	Balzan	22	8	4	10	24	31	−7	28	Qualification for the Top Six
7	Naxxar Lions	22	8	3	11	27	39	−12	27	Qualification for the Play-out
8	Floriana (Note: Floriana deducted 6 points.)	22	8	4	10	30	36	−6	22	Qualification for the Play-out
9	Vittoriosa Stars	22	5	3	14	24	47	−23	18	Qualification for the Play-out
10	Qormi	22	4	4	14	28	45	−17	16	Qualification for the Play-out
11	Tarxien Rainbows	22	4	4	14	26	45	−19	16	Qualification for the Play-out
12	Rabat Ajax	22	1	3	18	17	61	−44	6	Qualification for the Play-out

Source: Tribuna
Rules for classification: 1) Points; 2) Play-offs (only if needed to decide champions, teams for relegation or teams for UEFA competitions).

=== Championship Pool ===
==== Results ====
Match	Date	Opponent	Venue	Result	Scorers	Report
23	23 February 2014	Sliema Wanderers	National Stadium	1–1	Nafti 6'	Report
24	26 February 2014	Hibernians	National Stadium	3–1	Denni 34', Caruana 36', Nafti 58'	Report
25	11 March 2014	Mosta	National Stadium	2–2	Alan 8', Elford-Alliyu 78'	Report
26	15 March 2014	Balzan	Hibernians Stadium	3–1	Caruana 21', Elford-Alliyu 55', Agius 89'	Report
27	23 March 2014	Birkirkara	National Stadium	0–0		Report
28	30 March 2014	Sliema Wanderers	National Stadium	2–0	Montebello 40', Elford-Alliyu 90'	Report
29	6 April 2014	Hibernians	National Stadium	3–2	Montebello 15', Alan 50', Briffa 57'	Report
30	12 April 2014	Mosta	Hibernians Stadium	5–0	Denni (2) 12', 29', Fenech 44', Montebello 53', Owonikoko Seun 77'	Report
31	21 April 2014	Balzan	National Stadium	1–0	Denni 51'	Report
32	26 April 2014	Birkirkara	National Stadium	2–0	Bajada 2', Briffa 90+4'	Report

==== Final league table ====
Pos	Team	Pld	W	D	L	GF	GA	GD	Pts	Qualification
1	Valletta (C)	32	24	5	3	74	21	+53	51	Qualification for the 2014–15 UEFA Champions League
2	Birkirkara	32	25	3	4	76	25	+51	50	Qualification for the 2014–15 UEFA Europa League
3	Hibernians	32	18	4	10	77	51	+26	35	Qualification for the 2014–15 UEFA Europa League
4	Mosta	32	15	6	11	58	57	+1	32	
5	Sliema Wanderers	32	14	10	8	54	42	+12	31	Qualification for the 2014–15 UEFA Europa League (Note: Sliema Wanderers qualified for the 2014–15 UEFA Europa League as runners-up of the 2013–14 Maltese FA Trophy, This was because the winners Valletta had qualified for the 2014–15 UEFA Champions League.)
6	Balzan	32	9	5	18	36	58	−22	18	

Source: maltafootball.com:
Rules for classification: 1) Points; 2) Play-offs (only if needed to decide champions, teams for relegation or teams for UEFA competitions).
(C) Champions

== Gozo Cup ==
Round	Date	Opponent	Venue	Result	Scorers	Report
Semi-final	15 November 2013	Hibernians	Gozo Stadium	5–3	Bakare, Elford-Alliyu, Denni (2), Montebello	Report
Final	17 November 2013	Sliema Wanderers	Gozo Stadium	3–1	Dimech 49', Nafti 67', Mifsud Triganza 75'	Report

== U*Bet FA Trophy ==
Round	Date	Opponent	Venue	Result	Scorers	Report
R3	27 November 2013	Melita	Victor Tedesco Stadium	3–1	Fenech 4', Elford-Alliyu (2) 22', 28'	Report
R4	22 January 2014	Mosta	Victor Tedesco Stadium	3–0	Nafti 55', Ekani 66' (o.g.), Elford-Alliyu 90'	Report
Quarter-final	15 February 2014	Naxxar Lions	National Stadium	1–0	Denni 24'	Report
Semi-final	19 march 2014	Gżira United	National Stadium	2–0	Agius 23', Cremona 90'	Report
Final	1 May 2014	Sliema Wanderers	National Stadium	1–0	Elford-Alliyu 2'	Report

== Squad statistics ==
=== First Team ===
No.	Pos.	Name	Premier League		FA Trophy		UEFA Europa League		Total	
No.	Pos.	Name	Apps	Goals	Apps	Goals	Apps	Goals	Apps	Goals
-	GK	(Malta) Manuel Bartolo	0	0	1	0	0	0	1	0
-	GK	(Malta) Yenz Cini	14	0	0	0	0(1)	0	14(1)	0
-	GK	(Italy) Pietro Marino	7	0	1	0	4	0	12	0
-	GK	(Georgia (country)) Nukri Revishvili	11	0	3	0	0	0	14	0
-	DF	(Malta) Ian Azzopardi	2(4)	0	1(1)	0	3	0	6(5)	0
-	DF	(Malta) Steve Borg	21(2)	0	3(1)	0	0	0	24(3)	0
-	DF	(Malta) Yessous Camilleri	6	1	0	0	2	0	8	1
-	DF	(Malta) Jonathan Caruana	26(2)	4	5	0	2(1)	0	33(3)	4
-	DF	(Malta) Luke Dimech	20	0	2	0	4	0	26	0
-	DF	(Spain) Óscar Reyes Sánchez	8	0	2	0	0	0	10	0
-	DF	(Belgium) Jason Vandelannoite	10(2)	0	0	0	4	0	14(2)	0
-	MF	(Malta) Edmond Agius	22(5)	6	2(3)	1	1	0	25(8)	7
-	MF	(Malta) Shaun Bajada	21(8)	1	4(1)	0	2(2)	0	27(11)	1
-	MF	(Nigeria) Raimi Bakare	4	0	1	0	0	0	5	0
-	MF	(The Gambia) Hamza Barry	17(2)	2	3(1)	0	4	0	24(3)	2
-	MF	(Malta) Roderick Briffa	28(1)	7	5	0	4	0	37(1)	7
-	MF	(Brazil) Denni dos Santos	22(2)	19	1(1)	1	4	2	27(3)	22
-	MF	(Malta) Dyson Falzon	4(1)	0	0	0	4	0	8(1)	0
-	MF	(Malta) Ryan Fenech	28(1)	5	5	1	4	1	37(1)	7
-	MF	(Malta) Kurt Magro	0	0	0	0	0	0	0	0
-	MF	(Georgia (country)) Irakli Maisuradze	10(1)	0	2	0	0	0	12(1)	0
-	MF	(Tunisia) Abdelkarim Nafti	26(4)	11	3	1	0	0	29(4)	12
-	MF	(Moldova) Vladimir Rassulov	0	0	0(1)	0	0	0	0(1)	0
-	FW	(Brazil) Alan da Silva Souza	8(2)	2	1	0	0	0	9(2)	2
-	FW	(The Gambia) Aziz Corr Nyang	14(4)	4	2	0	0	0	16(4)	4
-	FW	(Malta) Llywelyn Cremona	0(9)	0	1(1)	1	1(1)	0	2(11)	1
-	FW	(England) Lateef Elford-Alliyu	5(4)	4	3(1)	4	0	0	8(5)	8
-	FW	(Spain) Arnal Llibert	0	0	0	0	1	0	1	0
-	FW	(Malta) Jean Pierre Mifsud Triganza	7(16)	5	2(2)	0	0	0	9(18)	5
-	FW	(Malta) Luke Montebello	5(3)	3	0(2)	0	0	0	5(5)	3
-	FW	(Nigeria) Augustine James Obaje	1	0	0	0	1	0	2	0
-	FW	(Nigeria) Abayomi Owonikoko Seun	2(1)	1	1	0	0	0	3(1)	1
-	FW	(Brazil) Rômulo	2(1)	1	0	0	0(1)	0	2(2)	1
-	FW	(Malta) Ian Zammit	2(13)	1	0(1)	0	0(4)	2	2(18)	3
–	–	Own goals	–	1	–	0	–	0	–	1

=== Youth Players ===
Note: Flags indicate national team as defined under FIFA eligibility rules; some limited exceptions apply. Players may hold more than one non-FIFA nationality.

No.	Pos.	Nation	Player
—	GK	(Malta) MLT	Maverick Buhagiar
—	GK	(Malta) MLT	Ryan Caruana (on loan to Sliema Wanderers)
—	DF	(Malta) MLT	Samir Arab (on loan to Vittoriosa Stars)
—	DF	(Malta) MLT	Miguel Attard
—	DF	(Malta) MLT	Jean Borg (on loan from Attard)
—	DF	(Malta) MLT	Daniel Camilleri
—	DF	(Malta) MLT	Leon Camilleri
—	DF	(Malta) MLT	Fabio Muscat
—	DF	(Malta) MLT	Tristan Nappa Licari
—	DF	(Malta) MLT	Clivert Sciberras
—	DF	(Malta) MLT	Mirco Vella
—	MF	(Malta) MLT	Siraj Arab (on loan to Vittoriosa Stars)
—	MF	(Malta) MLT	Joshua Buttigieg (on loan from Qala Saints)
—	MF	(Malta) MLT	Glenn Cassar

No.	Pos.	Nation	Player
—	MF	(Malta) MLT	Oznef Cassar (on loan to Kirkop United)
—	MF	(Malta) MLT	Stefan Cassar (on loan from Oratory Youths)
—	MF	(Malta) MLT	Kurt Drakard
—	MF	(Malta) MLT	Brandon Grech
—	MF	(Malta) MLT	Isaac McCarthy
—	MF	(Malta) MLT	Ian Montanaro
—	MF	(Malta) MLT	Kane Psaila (on loan to St. George's)
—	MF	(Malta) MLT	Nicholas Pulis
—	MF	(Malta) MLT	Dasser Sammut
—	MF	(Malta) MLT	Luke Scicluna
—	MF	(Malta) MLT	Dario Tabone
—	MF	(Malta) MLT	Matthew Thorne
—	MF	(Malta) MLT	Isaac Zammit (on loan to St. Andrews)
—	FW	(Malta) MLT	Kurt Borg

== Transfers ==
=== In ===
Date	Pos.	Name	From	Fee	Ref.
25 June 2013	GK	(Italy) Pietro Marino	(Italy) AS Reggina 1914	Free	
1 July 2013	FW	(Nigeria) Aud-Gustine James Obaje	(Nigeria) Union Bank	Free	
3 July 2013	MF	(The Gambia) Hamza Barry	(The Gambia) Gambia Ports Authority	Free	
15 July 2013	FW	(Spain) Arnal Llibert	Unattached	Free	
18 July 2013	FW	(Brazil) Rômulo	(Brazil) Audax Rio	Free	
9 August 2013	MF	(Tunisia) Abdelkarim Nafti	(Tunisia) Club Africain	Free	
10 August 2013	FW	(The Gambia) Aziz Corr Nyang	Unattached	Free	
31 August 2013	FW	(Malta) Jean Pierre Mifsud Triganza	(Malta) Birkirkara	Free	
7 September 2013	FW	(Malta) Luke Montebello	(Italy) US Livorno 1915	Free	
20 November 2013	MF	(Nigeria) Raimi Bakare	(Iran) Mes Rafsanjan	Free	
25 November 2013	FW	(England) Lateef Elford-Alliyu	(England) Tamworth	Free	
28 November 2013	DF	(Spain) Óscar Reyes Sánchez	Unattached	Free	
28 January 2014	GK	(Georgia (country)) Nukri Revishvili	(Georgia (country)) Dila Gori	Free	
28 January 2014	MF	(Georgia (country)) Irakli Maisuradze	(Georgia (country)) Dila Gori	Free	
31 January 2014	FW	(Nigeria) Abayomi Owonikoko Seun	Unattached	Free	
31 January 2014	FW	(Brazil) Alan da Silva Souza	(Ukraine) Bukovyna	Free	
31 January 2014	MF	(Moldova) Vladimir Rassulov	(Moldova) FC Speranța Crihana Veche	Free	

=== Out ===
Date	Pos.	Name	To	Fee	Ref.
20 May 2013	FW	(Brazil) William Barbosa	(Malta) St. Andrews	Free	
30 May 2013	MF	(Brazil) Gabriel	Released	Free	
30 May 2013	FW	(Senegal) Demba Touré	Released	Free	
20 June 2013	FW	(Malta) Michael Mifsud	Released	Free	
22 July 2013	FW	(Spain) Arnal Llibert	Released	Free	
4 August 2013	DF	(Malta) Dario Zampa	(Malta) St. Andrews	Free	
2 October 2013	FW	(Nigeria) Aud-Gustine James Obaje	Released	Free	
30 October 2013	FW	(Brazil) Rômulo	Released	Free	
31 December 2013	DF	(Belgium) Jason Vandelannoite	Released	Free	
28 January 2014	MF	(Nigeria) Raimi Bakare	Released	Free	
15 May 2014	DF	(Spain) Óscar Reyes Sánchez	Released	Free	
15 May 2014	FW	(Nigeria) Abayomi Owonikoko Seun	Released	Free	
15 May 2014	GK	(Italy) Pietro Marino	Released	Free	
15 May 2014	MF	(Moldova) Vladimir Rassulov	Released	Free	
31 May 2014	GK	(Georgia (country)) Nukri Revishvili	Released	Free	
30 June 2014	FW	(The Gambia) Aziz Corr Nyang	Released	Free	
30 June 2014	MF	(Brazil) Denni dos Santos	Released	Free	
30 June 2014	MF	(Brazil) Alan da Silva Souza	Released	Free	
30 June 2014	MF	(Georgia (country)) Irakli Maisuradze	Released	Free	

=== Loan in ===
Date from	Date to	Pos.	Name	From	Ref.
30 June 2013	31 May 2014	DF	(Malta) Jean Borg	(Malta) Attard	
1 August 2013	31 May 2015	MF	(Malta) Stefan Cassar	(Malta) Oratory Youths	
1 August 2013	31 May 2015	MF	(Malta) Joshua Buttigieg	(Malta) Qala Saints	

=== Loan out ===
Date from	Date to	Pos.	Name	To	Ref.
30 June 2013	31 May 2014	DF	(Malta) Bjorn Bondin	(Malta) Gżira United	
30 June 2013	31 May 2014	DF	(Malta) Rennie Forace	(Malta) Gżira United	
30 June 2013	31 May 2014	DF	(Malta) Jonathan Francica	(Malta) Gżira United	
6 July 2013	30 June 2014	FW	(Malta) Terence Scerri	(Malta) Naxxar Lions	
15 July 2013	31 May 2014	DF	(Malta) Kenneth Scicluna	(Malta) Żebbuġ Rangers	
18 July 2013	31 May 2014	MF	(Malta) Dylan D'Agostino	(Malta) Gudja United	
19 July 2013	31 May 2014	MF	(Malta) Siraj Arab	(Malta) Vittoriosa Stars	
19 July 2013	31 May 2014	MF	(Malta) Samir Arab	(Malta) Vittoriosa Stars	
1 August 2013	31 May 2014	MF	(Malta) Karl Azzopardi	(Malta) Gudja United	
1 August 2013	31 May 2014	MF	(Malta) Oznef Cassar	(Malta) Kirkop United	
3 August 2013	31 May 2014	DF	(Malta) Neil Curmi	(Malta) Marsa	
20 August 2013	31 May 2014	MF	(Malta) Kane Psaila	(Malta) St. George's	
24 August 2013	31 May 2014	MF	(Malta) Cleavon Frendo	(Malta) Pietà Hotspurs	
30 August 2013	31 May 2014	MF	(Malta) Isaac Zammit	(Malta) St. Andrews	
1 October 2013	31 May 2014	DF	(Malta) Gaetano Gesualdi	(Malta) Msida St. Joseph	
23 December 2013	31 May 2014	DF	(Malta) Kurt Magro	(Malta) Balzan	
26 December 2013	31 May 2014	DF	(Malta) Yessous Camilleri	(Malta) Żebbuġ Rangers	
28 December 2013	31 May 2014	MF	(Malta) Dyson Falzon	(Malta) Mosta	
3 January 2014	31 May 2014	MF	(Malta) Manuel Bartolo	(Malta) Balzan	
31 January 2014	31 May 2014	GK	(Malta) Ryan Caruana	(Malta) Sliema Wanderers	
31 January 2014	31 May 2014	FW	(Malta) Ian Zammit	(Malta) Mosta	
