= 2014 Maltese Super Cup =

Birkirkara	Valletta
2	1
- Date: 8 August 2014
- Venue: Ta' Qali National Stadium, Ta' Qali, Malta
- Referee: Mario Apap

The 2014 Maltese Super Cup was the 32nd Maltese Super Cup, an annual football match played between the winners of the previous season's Maltese Premier League and the FA Trophy. The game was played between Valletta, champions of the 2013–14 Maltese Premier League, and Birkirkara, who beat Hibernians in the final of the 2014–15 FA Trophy. Played at Ta' Qali National Stadium, Birkirkara won the match 2–1.

== Match ==
=== Details ===
8 August 2014
19:30 CET

Birkirkara	2–1	Valletta
Eliandro 16'; Herrera 69'		Caruana 57'

Ta' Qali National Stadium, Ta' Qali
Referee: Mario Apap

GK	(Malta) Justin Haber
DF	(Spain) Alejandro Mendoza
DF	(Serbia) Nikola Vukanac
DF	(Malta) Zach Muscat
DF	(Malta) Edward Herrera
DF	(Malta) Joseph Zerafa	(substituted off) 66'
MF	(Brazil) Matheus Bissi
MF	(Malta) Edmond Agius
MF	(Malta) Ryan Scicluna	(yellow card) 90+4'
MF	(Brazil) Rafael Ledesma	(substituted off) 89'
FW	(Brazil) Eliandro	(substituted off) 68'
Substitutes:
GK	(Malta) Justin Tonna
DF	(Malta) Ryan Camenzuli	(substituted on) 66'
MF	(Malta) Kurt Zammit
MF	(Malta) Antoine Borg
MF	(Malta) Gareth Sciberras
FW	(Malta) Leighton Grech	(substituted on) 89'
FW	(Brazil) Liliu	(substituted on) 68'
Manager:
(Malta) Paul Zammit

GK	(Malta) Yenz Cini
DF	(Malta) Jonathan Caruana
DF	(Malta) Ian Azzopardi
DF	(Malta) Ryan Camilleri
DF	(Malta) Luke Dimech	(yellow card) 86'
MF	(Malta) Ryan Fenech	(substituted off) 87'
MF	(Portugal) Hugo Faria	(yellow card) 73'
MF	(Malta) Shaun Bajada
MF	(Australia) Adrian Zahra	(substituted off) 59'
MF	(Tunisia) Abdelkarim Nafti	(substituted off) 81'
FW	(England) Lateef Elford-Alliyu
Substitutes:
GK	(Malta) Nicky Vella
DF	(Malta) Steve Borg
MF	(Malta) Llywelyn Cremona
MF	(Malta) Christian Caruana
FW	(Malta) Ian Zammit	(substituted on) 87'
FW	(Malta) Luke Montebello	(substituted on) 81'
FW	(Cameroon) Raphael Kooh Sohna	(substituted on) 59'
Manager:
(Malta) Gilbert Agius

Match officials

- Assistant referees:
  - Duncan Sultana
  - Peter Abela
- Additional assistant referees:
  - Adrian Azzopardi
  - Fyodor Zammit
- Fourth official: Luke Portelli

== See also ==
- 2014–15 Maltese Premier League
- 2014–15 Maltese FA Trophy
