= Vandelannoite =

Vandelannoite is a surname. Notable people with the surname include:

- Jason Vandelannoite (born 1986), Belgian footballer, brother of Jude
- Jude Vandelannoite (born 1973), Belgian footballer
