= Alan (footballer, born 1987) =

Brazilian footballer

Personal information
- Full name: Alan da Silva Souza
- Date of birth: 9 December 1987 (age 38)
- Place of birth: Andirá, Paraná, Brazil
- Height: 1.74 m (5 ft 9 in)
- Position: Midfielder

Senior career*
Years	Team	Apps	(Gls)
2006	Matsubara	20	(0)
2006–2007	Metalurh Dontesk	13	(0)
2006–2007	→ Stal Alchevsk (loan)	13	(2)
2008–2009	Arsenal Kyiv	6	(0)
2010	Stal Alchevsk	10	(4)
2010–2011	AEK Larnaca	15	(0)
2013–2014	Bukovyna Chernivtsi	15	(1)
2014	Valletta	10	(2)
2014–2015	Ergotelis	5	(0)
2015–2017	Balzan	38	(12)
- * Club domestic league appearances and goals as of 8 February 2016

Alan da Silva Souza (born 9 December 1987 in Andirá, Paraná) is a Brazilian midfielder who last played for Balzan.

== Personal life ==
Alan has a younger brother Leonardo who is also a professional football player.

== Statistics ==
Club	Season	League		Cup		Continental		Total	
Club	Season	Apps	Goals	Apps	Goals	Apps	Goals	Apps	Goals
Arsenal Kyiv	2008–09	3	0	0	0	0	0	3	0
Stal Alchevsk	2009–10	10	4	0	0	0	0	10	4
AEK Larnaca	2010–11	15	0	0	0	0	0	15	0
Bukovyna	2012–13	10	1	0	0	0	0	10	1
Bukovyna	2013–14	5	0	0	0	0	0	5	0
Valletta (loan)	2013–14	10	2	1	0	0	0	11	2
Ergotelis	2014–15	5	0	0	0	0	0	5	0
Balzan	2015–16	15	4	4	1	0	0	19	5
Balzan	2016–17	23	8	2	0	0	0	25	8
Career total		96	19	7	1	0	0	103	20
