= Matheus Bissi =

Brazilian footballer (born 1991)

Personal information
- Full name: Matheus Bissi da Silva
- Date of birth: 19 March 1991 (age 35)
- Place of birth: Piracicaba, Brazil
- Height: 1.88 m (6 ft 2 in)
- Positions: Defensive midfielder; centre-back

Team information
- Current team: KFA

Youth career
- 2002–2007: Ponte Preta
- 2008: XV de Piracicaba
- 2008–2009: Sporting
- 2010–2011: Flamengo

Senior career*
Years	Team	Apps	(Gls)
2011–2012	Flamengo	0	(0)
2011–2012	→ Marcílio Dias (loan)	2	(0)
2013	Banga Gargždai	9	(0)
2013–2015	Birkirkara	40	(6)
2015–2016	Raków Częstochowa	13	(0)
2016–2017	Tourizense	24	(1)
2017	Slavia Sofia	2	(0)
2018–2019	Stumbras	24	(0)
2019	Al-Muharraq		
2020–2021	Panevėžys	48	(2)
2022–2023	Atyrau	42	(2)
2024	Dalvík/Reynir	20	(1)
2025–	KFA	31	(3)
- * Club domestic league appearances and goals as of 14 October 2026

Matheus Bissi da Silva (born 19 March 1991), known as Matheus Bissi, is a Brazilian professional footballer who plays as a defensive midfielder or centre-back for Icelandic club KF Austfjarða. (Note: Matheus Bissi at Soccerway) He also holds Portuguese citizenship.

== Club career ==
Bissi made his II liga debut for Raków Częstochowa on 5 September 2015 in a game against Olimpia Zambrów.

In July 2017, Bissi joined Bulgarian First League club Slavia Sofia.

== Honours ==
Birkirkara

- Maltese FA Trophy: 2014–15
- Maltese Super Cup: 2014

Panevėžys

- Lithuanian Cup: 2020
- Lithuanian Supercup: 2021
