= Luke Montebello =

Maltese footballer (born 1995)

Personal information
- Full name: Luke Montebello
- Date of birth: 13 August 1995 (age 31)
- Place of birth: Pietà, Malta
- Position: Forward

Youth career
- 1999–2011: Birkirkara
- 2011–2012: Livorno

Senior career*
Years	Team	Apps	(Gls)
2012–2014	Livorno	0	(0)
2013	Valletta	31	(8)
2015	→ Żebbuġ Rangers (loan)	12	(2)
2015	→ Tarxien Rainbows (loan)	31	(12)
2016	→ Pembroke Athleta (loan)	4	(1)
2017–2019	Birkirkara	27	(12)
2019–2020	Balzan	6	(2)
2020–2022	Birkirkara	46	(24)
2022–2025	Ħamrun Spartans	69	(38)
2025–2026	Sliema Wanderers	18	(3)

International career^{‡}
	Malta U17	3	(0)
	Malta U19	3	(1)
2014	Malta U21	1	(0)
2017–2026	Malta	32	(0)
- * Club domestic league appearances and goals as of 10 October 2026 ‡ National team caps and goals as of 10 October 2026

Luke Montebello (born 13 August 1995) is a Maltese former professional footballer who played as a forward .

== Club career ==
Having played his youth football for the Birkirkara nursery, Montebello joined Livorno's youth sector in 2011. He had some success with the Italian youth side, before returning to Malta and signing with Valletta on a five-year contract.

Montebello was sent out on loan to Żebbuġ Rangers for the second half of the 2014–15 season in a bid to help them avoid relegation. In search of first team football, he joined Tarxien Rainbows in summer 2015 on loan, scoring 12 goals in 31 matches in the Maltese Premier League.

He was again sent out on loan for the 2016–17 season, this time to woodenspoonists Pembroke Athleta. This was short-lived however, as he was called back to Valletta for the second half of the season, after he injured his shoulder in October. He underwent surgery which turned out to be successful, however he still needed 7 to 8 weeks of recovery.

In 2017, Montebello returned to his childhood club Birkirkara on a permanent deal.

In January 2018, Montebello was banned for match-fixing for one year. After the suspension, he returned to play for Birkirkara again.

In 2022, Montebello joined Ħamrun Spartans, where he would win the Maltese Premier League in the 2022/23 season and would also win the subsequent Maltese Super Cup. On the 18th of March 2025 Luke mutually parted ways with the club after an altercation with fans post Hamrun Spartan's 1-0 defeat to Sliema.

On the 14th of April 2025 it was announced that Luke would be returning to a club in the summer, where he had spent some time as a junior, in the shape of Valletta F.C., who themselves had just come off a season, which saw an instant return to the Maltese Premier league, after a one-year absence.

== International career ==
Luke Montebello featured in the Malta national under-17 football team and the Malta national under-19 football team. He also featured in the Malta national under-21 football team under Silvio Vella, making his debut on 5 September 2014.

Before an Under-21 match against Czech Republic national under-21 football team, allegedly Montebello was approached to throw the match for a sum of money; he allegedly did not accept and testified against the bribers in court.

He was first included provisionally in the senior side on 4 November 2015. He made his Malta national football team debut under Pietro Ghedin in a 1–3 defeat against Slovakia on 26 March 2017.

== Style of play ==
With a tall and powerful physique, Montebello has been described as a target man.

== Honours ==
=== Club ===
Valletta

- Maltese Premier League: 2013–14, 2015–16
- Maltese FA Trophy: 2013–14

Ħamrun Spartans

- Maltese Premier League: 2022–23, 2023–24
- Maltese Super Cup: 2023

Individual

- Maltese Premier League Top Goalscorer: 2023–24
