= Jude Vandelannoite =

Belgian footballer

Personal information
- Full name: Jude Vandelannoite
- Date of birth: 14 February 1973 (age 53)
- Place of birth: Waregem, Belgium
- Height: 1.78 m (5 ft 10 in)
- Position: Midfielder

Youth career
- Olympic Koolskamp

Senior career*
Years	Team	Apps	(Gls)
1991–1998	Waregem		
1998–2000	Kortrijk		
2000–2001	Athinaikos	23	(0)
2001–2005	Kerkyra		
2005	Panserraikos		
- * Club domestic league appearances and goals

Jude Vandelannoite (born 14 February 1973) is a retired Belgian football player.

== Playing career ==
Vandelannoite began his playing career with K.S.V. Waregem and joined K.V. Kortrijk in 1998. He moved to Greece where he would play for Athinaikos in Alpha Ethniki before joining Kerkyra in 2001. Vandelannoite played several seasons for Kerkyra, helping the club earn promotion to the Alpha Ethniki, where he would make three appearances during the 2004–05 season.

== Personal ==
Vandelannoite's brother, Jason is also a professional footballer.
