= 2014–15 Maltese First Division =

Maltese First Division
- Season: 2014–15
- Champions: Pembroke Athleta
- Promoted: Pembroke Athleta; St. Andrews
- Relegated: Żurrieq; Msida Saint-Joseph; Birżebbuġa St. Peter's
- Matches: 183
- Goals: 543 (2.97 per match)
- Top goalscorer: Ariel Laudisi (16 goals)

The 2014–15 Maltese First Division (referred to as the BOV First Division due to sponsorship reasons) began on 12 September 2014 and finished with a play-off match on 3 May 2015.

== Teams ==
The following teams have changed division since the 2013–14 season.

=== To First Division ===
Promoted from Maltese Second Division

- Mqabba
- Pembroke Athleta
- Fgura United

Relegated from Maltese Premier League

- Vittoriosa Stars
- Rabat Ajax

=== From First Division ===
Relegated to Maltese Second Division

- Ħamrun Spartans
- Żejtun Corinthians

Promoted to Maltese Premier League

- Pietà Hotspurs
- Żebbuġ Rangers

== League table ==
| Pos | Team | Pld | W | D | L | GF | GA | GD | Pts | Promotion or relegation |
|---|---|---|---|---|---|---|---|---|---|---|
| 1 | Pembroke Athleta (C, P) | 26 | 17 | 4 | 5 | 54 | 22 | +32 | 55 | Promotion to the 2015–16 Maltese Premier League |
| 2 | St. Andrews (P) | 26 | 15 | 6 | 5 | 49 | 32 | +17 | 51 | Promotion to the 2015–16 Maltese Premier League |
| 3 | Gżira United (O, P) | 26 | 14 | 3 | 9 | 46 | 31 | +15 | 45 | Qualification for the play-off |
| 4 | Melita | 26 | 14 | 3 | 9 | 36 | 28 | +8 | 45 | Qualification for the play-off |
| 5 | Fgura United | 26 | 11 | 10 | 5 | 32 | 27 | +5 | 43 | |
| 6 | St. George's | 26 | 11 | 8 | 7 | 43 | 38 | +5 | 41 | |
| 7 | Gudja United | 26 | 11 | 8 | 7 | 46 | 32 | +14 | 41 | |
| 8 | Vittoriosa Stars | 26 | 11 | 5 | 10 | 44 | 43 | +1 | 38 | |
| 9 | Lija Athletic | 26 | 12 | 2 | 12 | 45 | 43 | +2 | 38 | |
| 10 | Mqabba | 26 | 10 | 6 | 10 | 40 | 36 | +4 | 36 | |
| 11 | Rabat Ajax | 26 | 8 | 5 | 13 | 27 | 37 | −10 | 29 | |
| 12 | Żurrieq (R) | 26 | 6 | 4 | 16 | 29 | 46 | −17 | 22 | Relegation to the 2015–16 Maltese Second Division |
| 13 | Msida Saint-Joseph (R) | 26 | 4 | 3 | 19 | 27 | 64 | −37 | 15 | Relegation to the 2015–16 Maltese Second Division |
| 14 | Birżebbuġa St. Peter's (R) | 26 | 3 | 3 | 20 | 25 | 64 | −39 | 12 | Relegation to the 2015–16 Maltese Second Division |

Source: Malta Football Association
Rules for classification: 1) points; 2) goal difference; 3) number of goals scored
(C) Champions; (O) Play-off winners; (P) Promoted; (R) Relegated

== Results ==
Each team plays every other team in the league home-and-away for a total of 26 matches played each.

| Home \ Away | BBĠ | FGR | GDJ | GŻI | LJA | MEL | MQB | MSJ | PBK | RBT | STA | STG | VIT | ŻRQ |
|---|---|---|---|---|---|---|---|---|---|---|---|---|---|---|
| Birżebbuġa St. Peter's | — | 0–1 | 1–3 | 0–1 | 1–5 | 0–1 | 0–0 | 0–1 | 1–4 | 1–0 | 5–7 | 2–5 | 3–3 | 0–1 |
| Fgura United | 1–1 | — | 0–0 | 4–3 | 4–2 | 0–2 | 2–1 | 2–1 | 1–0 | 2–1 | 0–0 | 1–1 | 1–0 | 0–0 |
| Gudja United | 4–0 | 3–2 | — | 3–1 | 1–4 | 2–2 | 0–0 | 2–1 | 0–1 | 2–4 | 2–1 | 2–2 | 0–2 | 4–1 |
| Gżira United | 2–1 | 1–1 | 0–0 | — | 1–3 | 2–3 | 2–0 | 1–0 | 0–2 | 0–0 | 0–2 | 1–2 | 4–1 | 2–1 |
| Lija Athletic | 4–3 | 1–0 | 0–2 | 0–3 | — | 2–1 | 0–0 | 3–1 | 1–3 | 1–3 | 1–4 | 0–1 | 0–2 | 2–0 |
| Melita | 1–0 | 0–0 | 1–2 | 1–3 | 1–0 | — | 3–1 | 4–0 | 2–1 | 1–2 | 2–2 | 1–2 | 2–1 | 1–0 |
| Mqabba | 3–0 | 2–0 | 1–5 | 0–5 | 2–3 | 0–1 | — | 2–1 | 2–3 | 2–1 | 3–1 | 4–0 | 1–2 | 1–1 |
| Msida Saint-Joseph | 1–3 | 1–2 | 2–6 | 1–6 | 0–5 | 2–1 | 1–1 | — | 1–2 | 0–1 | 1–3 | 1–1 | 0–3 | 4–1 |
| Pembroke Athleta | 4–0 | 1–1 | 1–0 | 1–0 | 1–0 | 0–1 | 1–1 | 4–0 | — | 1–0 | 0–0 | 1–0 | 1–1 | 4–1 |
| Rabat Ajax | 1–0 | 1–2 | 1–1 | 0–1 | 2–0 | 0–2 | 0–3 | 0–0 | 3–1 | — | 2–1 | 1–0 | 1–1 | 1–5 |
| St. Andrews | 4–0 | 2–2 | 0–0 | 2–1 | 2–3 | 2–1 | 3–1 | 2–1 | 2–1 | 3–1 | — | 1–1 | 0–4 | 1–0 |
| St. George's | 3–1 | 1–0 | 3–2 | 2–3 | 1–1 | 2–0 | 1–3 | 1–2 | 2–5 | 1–1 | 1–0 | — | 2–1 | 1–1 |
| Vittoriosa Stars | 4–1 | 1–2 | 0–0 | 0–1 | 4–1 | 2–0 | 0–4 | 3–2 | 2–8 | 2–1 | 0–1 | 2–2 | — | 1–4 |
| Żurrieq | 0–1 | 1–1 | 1–0 | 1–2 | 0–3 | 0–1 | 0–2 | 5–2 | 0–3 | 3–0 | 0–2 | 1–5 (Note: Match between Żurrieq and St. George's was originally played on 7 November 2014 but was abandoned due to heavy rainfall with a 0–0 scoreline) | 1–2 | — |

Source: Malta Football Association
Legend: Blue = home team win; Yellow = draw; Red = away team win.

== Play-off ==
Due to a tie for third place between Melita and Gżira United, a play-off match was played to determine which team would participate in the promotion play-off against the tenth-placed team from the Premier League. The match was played on 3 May 2015.

| 3 May 2015 | Gżira United | 0–0 (4–3 p) | Melita | Centenary Stadium |
| 16:00 | | Report | | Referee: Matthew Degabriele; Man of the Match: George Gribbon |
| | Penalties |
| | Moises Avila Perez (penalty scored); Jerry Ani (penalty missed); Ryan Dalli (penalty scored); Matteo Caribotti (penalty scored); Daniel Scerri (penalty scored) | | (penalty scored) Julian Galea; (penalty scored) Kurt Coleiro; (penalty scored) George Gribbon; (penalty missed) Federico Mennini; (penalty missed) Nicholas Micallef |

== Top scorers ==
As of 3 May 2015

| Rank | Player | Club | Goals |
|---|---|---|---|
| 1 | (Argentina) Ariel Laudisi | Pembroke Athleta | 17 |
| 2 | (Italy) Luigi del Giudice | Mqabba | 14 |
| 2 | (Italy) Angelo Catania | Gudja United | 14 |
| 4 | (Nigeria) Jojo Ogunnupe | Żurrieq | 11 |
| 4 | (Nigeria) Jeremiah Ani | Birżebbuġa St. Peter's | 11 |
| 4 | (Malta) Matteo Desira Buttigieg | St. Andrew's | 11 |
| 7 | (Nigeria) John Nwoba Ogechukwu | Gżira United | 10 |
| 7 | (Malta) Ayrton Azzopardi | Pembroke Athleta | 10 |
| 7 | (Nigeria) Ige Adeshina | Lija Athletic | 10 |
| 7 | (Malta) Larson Mallia | St. George's | 10 |
| 7 | (Bulgaria) Trayo Grozev | St. Andrew's | 10 |
| 7 | (Nigeria) Gabriel Okechukwu | St. George's | 10 |
