= Clayton Failla =

Maltese footballer

Personal information
- Date of birth: 8 January 1986 (age 40)
- Place of birth: Żabbar, Malta
- Height: 1.75 m (5 ft 9 in)
- Position: Midfielder

Team information
- Current team: Gżira United
- Number: 13

Youth career
- Żabbar St. Patrick

Senior career*
Years	Team	Apps	(Gls)
2002–2005	Żabbar St. Patrick	33	(2)
2005–2009	Hibernians	105	(11)
2009–2011	Sliema Wanderers	42	(2)
2011–2018	Hibernians	194	(77)
2018	Floriana	12	(2)
2019	Birkirkara	10	(0)
2019–2020	Hamrun Spartans	19	(2)
2020–2025	Mosta	103	(23)
2025–	Gżira United	26	(1)

International career^{‡}
	Malta U21	16	(0)
2008–2018	Malta	55	(2)
- * Club domestic league appearances and goals as of 18 May 2026 ‡ National team caps and goals as of 6 January 2018

Clayton Failla (born 8 January 1986) is a Maltese professional footballer who plays for Maltese Premier League side Gżira United, where he plays as a midfielder and occasionally as a defender.

== Playing career ==
=== St. Patrick ===
Failla was born in Żabbar, Malta. He began his career with his boyhood team Żabbar St. Patrick as a trainee. In 2001–02 he was promoted to the senior team squad, getting three games as a substitute. He was a first team regular when the team won promotion in 2003–04. He made his Premier Division debut during the 2004–05 season.

Failla showed potential, despite St. Patrick's disappointing season,. In January 2005, Failla moved to Hibernians. During his time with St. Patrick, he made 33 appearances and scored two goals.

=== Hibernians ===
Failla continued the second half of the 2004–05 season with Hibernians, and played in their first team squad. Failla helped his new side to a third-place finish in the Maltese Premier League, making 11 appearances and scoring one goal in the process.

Failla began the 2005–06 season as an established member of the first team squad. Hibernians managed their second third-place finish in as many seasons. Failla did however get his hands on his first piece of silverware with Hibernians as the club won the Maltese Cup, after beating Floriana 1–0 in the final. During the season Failla made 23 appearances and scored one goal.

For the 2006–07 season Failla made 22 appearances, but failing to find the net, as the team recorded a fifth-place finish in the Maltese Premier League. Failla did however add to his previous success as Hibernians beat Sliema Wanderers on penalties to retain the Maltese Cup. Failla made 22 appearances and scored twice in the 2007–08 season.

In the 2008–09 season, Hibernians won the Maltese Premier League for the first time in seven years, after beating Valletta to the top table finish by one point. During the season Failla made 27 appearances, scored seven goals and provided 11 assists. He was chosen as Man of the Match nine times during the season, most for any Premier Division player. Failla also added to his honours the Maltese Player of the Year award.

=== Sliema Wanderers ===
On 17 June 2009, Failla made the move from Hibernians to Sliema Wanderers and was allocated the number 77 shirt. He made his Premier League debut for Sliema Wanderers on 30 August 2009 in a 1–0 defeat to Qormi, he played 77 minutes of the match, before been substituted for Matthew Bartolo.

Failla scored his first Premier League goal for Sliema Wanderers on 17 October 2009, when he scored the third goal in a 5–0 victory over Ħamrun Spartans.

=== Hibernians ===
On 9 August 2011, Failla returned to his former club Hibernians, for the 2011–12 season of the Maltese Premier League. Failla had a trial with Hull City of England, playing for the team in a summer tournament. Failla is also the current captain of Hibernians.

=== Floriana ===
On 28 May 2017, Clayton was officially announced as a signing for the Maltese Premier League Club Floriana. Failla thanked Hibernians for the past experience with the Paolites whilst looking forward for his experience with the Greens.

== International career ==
Failla was also an international player for the Malta national football team. He made his international debut in 2008 and played in defence but sometimes also played as a midfielder. In 2014, in a friendly match Malta against Slovakia, he became a famous meme, because the system sound of the stadium played Numb, from Linkin Park, instead of Malta National Anthem and the cameras got him laughing with the music. Failla played his final match for Malta in a 1-1 draw at home to the Faroe Islands, ending a 10-year journey with the national team.

== Career statistics ==
Club performance			League		Cup		League Cup		Continental		Total	
Season	Club	League	Apps	Goals	Apps	Goals	Apps	Goals	Apps	Goals	Apps	Goals
Malta			League		Maltese Cup		League Cup		Europe		Total	
2004–05	St. Patrick	Maltese Premier League	13	1	0	0	0	0	0	0	13	1
2004–05	Hibernians	Maltese Premier League	11	1	0	0	0	0	0	0	11	1
2005–06	Hibernians	Maltese Premier League	23	1	0	0	0	0	0	0	23	1
2006–07	Hibernians	Maltese Premier League	22	0	0	0	0	0	0	0	22	0
2007–08	Hibernians	Maltese Premier League	22	2	0	0	0	0	0	0	22	2
2008–09	Hibernians	Maltese Premier League	27	7	0	0	0	0	0	0	27	7
2009–10	Sliema Wanderers	Maltese Premier League	26	3	1	0	0	0	0	0	27	3
2010–11	Sliema Wanderers	Maltese Premier League	15	0	1	0	0	0	0	0	16	0
2011–12	Hibernians	Maltese Premier League	31	13	4	4	0	0	0	0	35	17
2012–13	Hibernians	Maltese Premier League	25	14	5	5	0	0	0	0	30	19
2013–14	Hibernians	Maltese Premier League	29	13	2	2	0	0	0	0	31	15
2014–15	Hibernians	Maltese Premier League	32	16	4	0	0	0	0	0	36	16
Total	Malta		276	71	17	11	0	0	0	0	295	82
Career total			276	71	17	11	0	0	0	0	295	82

=== International goals ===
#	Date	Venue	Opponent	Score	Result	Competition
1.	6 September 2013	Ta' Qali National Stadium, Ta' Qali	Denmark	1–1	1–2	2014 World Cup qualifying
2.	16 November 2014	Vasil Levski National Stadium, Sofia	Bulgaria	1–1	1–1	Euro 2016 qualifying

== Honours ==
=== Club ===
Hibernians

- Maltese Premier League: 2008–09, 2014–15
- Maltese FA Trophy: 2006–07, 2007–08, 2012–13, 2013–14

=== Individual ===
- Maltese Player of the Year: 2008–09, 2011–12
