= Hugo Faria =

Portuguese footballer

Personal information
- Full name: Hugo Miguel da Encarnação Pires Faria
- Date of birth: 15 February 1983 (age 43)
- Place of birth: São Brás de Alportel, Portugal
- Height: 1.83 m (6 ft 0 in)
- Position: Midfielder

Youth career
- 1993–1995: 1º Janeiro
- 1995–1999: Louletano
- 1999–2001: Porto
- 2001–2002: Louletano

Senior career*
Years	Team	Apps	(Gls)
2001	Porto B	1	(0)
2001–2004	Louletano	77	(4)
2004–2008	União Leiria	53	(0)
2005–2006	→ Olhanense (loan)	27	(1)
2008	Farul Constanţa	0	(0)
2008–2013	Enosis Neon	133	(2)
2013–2014	Kalloni	24	(0)
2014–2015	Valletta	12	(0)
2015	Apollon Smyrnis	3	(0)
2015–2016	Livingston	18	(0)
2016	Airdrieonians	14	(0)
2017–2018	Louletano	32	(1)
Total		394	(8)

International career
2003–2004	Portugal U20	14	(0)
- * Club domestic league appearances and goals

Hugo Miguel da Encarnação Pires Faria (born 15 February 1983) is a Portuguese former professional footballer who played as a midfielder.

== Club career ==
Born in São Brás de Alportel, Faro District, Faria played youth football for three clubs, including FC Porto from ages 16 to 18. He started his senior career with Louletano DC, with which he spent three seasons in the third division.

Faria moved straight to the Primeira Liga in the summer of 2004, signing with U.D. Leiria. He made his debut as a professional on 7 November, coming on as a late substitute in a 1–0 away win against Académica de Coimbra; it would be the first of only two league appearances during the season.

From 2008 to 2013, Faria competed in the Cypriot First Division, always with Enosis Neon Paralimni FC. He joined AEL Kalloni F.C. ahead of the following campaign, starting in 19 games to help his team to finish 12th in the Super League Greece.

Faria split 2014–15 with Valletta F.C. from Malta and Apollon Smyrnis F.C. in the Greek second division. He signed for Livingston on 19 August 2015, agreeing to a five-month contract after a successful trial. His maiden appearance in the Scottish Championship took place only three days later, as he played the full 90 minutes and was booked in a 1–2 home defeat to Falkirk.

Faria left Livingston in January 2016, and signed for Airdrieonians also in the country shortly after. He was suspended by the latter in October pending investigation of an accusation of bullying made against him, leaving two months later in order to return to Portugal.

On 8 November 2018, immediately after retiring following a spell in the Portuguese third tier with Louletano, the 35-year-old Faria was appointed first-team coach at English Premier League club AFC Bournemouth.

== International career ==
Faria represented Portugal at under-20 level, earning his first cap on 5 February 2003 in a 5–2 friendly victory over the Czech Republic in Elvas. He represented the country in the 2004 edition of the Toulon Tournament, scoring an own goal in a 1–0 group stage defeat against Sweden.

== Career statistics ==
As of 7 January 2016

Club	Season	League			Cup		Continental		Total	
Club	Season	Division	Apps	Goals	Apps	Goals	Apps	Goals	Apps	Goals
Porto B	2000–01	Segunda Divisão	1	0	—		—		5	0
Louletano	2001–02	Segunda Divisão	4	0	0	0	—		4	0
Louletano	2002–03	Segunda Divisão	35	2	3	0	—		38	2
Louletano	2003–04	Segunda Divisão	38	2	3	0	—		41	2
Louletano	Total		77	4	6	0	—		83	4
União Leiria	2004–05	Primeira Liga	2	0	1	0	—		3	0
União Leiria	2006–07	Primeira Liga	26	0	2	0	—		28	0
União Leiria	2007–08	Primeira Liga	25	0	4	0	5 (Note: Appearances in UEFA Intertoto Cup and UEFA Cup)	0	34	0
União Leiria	Total		53	0	7	0	5	0	65	0
Olhanense (loan)	2005–06	Segunda Liga	27	1	2	0	—		29	1
Enosis Neon	2008–09	Cypriot First Division	28	1			—		28	1
Enosis Neon	2009–10	Cypriot First Division	28	0			—		28	0
Enosis Neon	2010–11	Cypriot First Division	27	1			—		27	1
Enosis Neon	2011–12	Cypriot First Division	27	0			—		27	0
Enosis Neon	2012–13	Cypriot First Division	23	0	4	0	—		27	0
Enosis Neon	Total		133	2	4	0	—		137	2
Kalloni	2013–14	Super League Greece	24	0	3	0	—		27	0
Valletta	2014–15	Maltese Premier League	12	0	1	0	2 (Note: Appearances in UEFA Europa League)	0	15	0
Apollon Smyrnis	2014–15	Football League	3	0	2	0	—		5	0
Livingston	2015–16	Scottish Championship	18	0	2	0	—		20	0
Career total			348	7	27	0	7	0	382	7
