= Aziz Corr Nyang =

Gambian footballer

Personal information
- Full name: Aziz Corr Nyang
- Date of birth: 27 August 1984 (age 42)
- Place of birth: Banjul, Gambia
- Height: 1.85 m (6 ft 1 in)
- Position: Striker

Youth career
- Gambia Ports Authority
- –2000: IFK Lidingö

Senior career*
Years	Team	Apps	(Gls)
2000–2001	IFK Lidingö	19	(21)
2002–2004	Djurgårdens IF	7	(0)
2004	→ Åtvidabergs FF (loan)	15	(3)
2006	Tyresö FF		
2007–2009	Assyriska FF	37	(5)
2009–2012	GIF Sundsvall	34	(10)
2011	→ IF Brommapojkarna (loan)	23	(3)
2012	IF Brommapojkarna	12	(0)
2013–2014	Valletta	18	(4)
2014–2016	Assyriska FF	60	(5)
2017	Assyriska FF	5	(0)

International career^{‡}
2002–2011	Gambia	17	(3)
- * Club domestic league appearances and goals as of 8 November 2017 ‡ National team caps and goals as of January 21, 2008

Aziz Corr Nyang (born 27 August 1984 in Banjul) is a Gambian footballer who plays as a striker.

== Honours ==
=== Club ===
Djurgårdens IF

- Allsvenskan (2): 2002, 2003
- Svenska Cupen (2): 2002, 2004
