= 2014–15 Maltese Premier League =

Maltese Premier League
- Season: 2014–15
- Champions: Hibernians (11th title)
- Relegated: Pietà Hotspurs; Żebbuġ Rangers
- Champions League: Hibernians
- Europa League: Valletta; Birkirkara F.C. Balzan
- Matches played: 132
- Goals scored: 397 (3.01 per match)
- Top goalscorer: Tarabei (23 goals)
- Biggest home win: Hibernians 4–0 Balzan; Naxxar Lions 4–0 Żebbuġ Rangers
- Biggest away win: Żebbuġ Rangers 0–4 Birkirkara
- Highest scoring: Balzan 5–3 Sliema Wanderers
- All statistics correct as of 8 February 2015.

The 2014–15 Maltese Premier League is the 100th season of the Maltese Premier League, Valletta are the defending champions, having won their 22nd title the previous season.

The Premier League consists of three rounds for a total of 33 games. After the end of the second round, the points earned are halved.

== Format ==
In a change from last season, the league will not split after twenty-two matches. All teams will advance to a second phase where half of the first phase points are carried over and teams will play each other once.

== Venues ==
2014–15 Maltese Premier League is located in Malta	Ta' Qali	Ta' Qali	Paola	Hamrun
2014–15 Maltese Premier League is located in Malta	Ta' Qali National Stadium	Centenary Stadium	Tony Bezzina Stadium	Victor Tedesco Stadium
2014–15 Maltese Premier League is located in Malta	Capacity: 16,997	Capacity: 3,000	Capacity: 2,968	Capacity: 1,962

== Teams ==
Location of teams in 2014–15 Maltese Premier League

=== Relegation and promotion ===
Vittoriosa Stars and Rabat Ajax were relegated finishing 11th and 12th, respectively, in the previous season.

Promoted were, Pietà Hotspurs and Zebbug Rangers finishing 1st and 2nd, respectively, in the First Division the previous season.

Club	City	Stadium	Capacity
Balzan F.C.	Balzan	Ta' Qali National Stadium	17.797
Birkirkara F.C.	Birkirkara	Infetti Ground	2.500
Floriana F.C.	Floriana	Ta' Qali National Stadium	17.797
Hibernians F.C.	Paola	Hibernians Ground	2.968
Mosta F.C.	Mosta	Mosta Ground	1.200
Naxxar Lions F.C.	Naxxar	Ta' Qali National Stadium	17.797
Pietà Hotspurs F.C.	Pietà	Ta' Qali National Stadium	17.797
Qormi F.C.	Qormi	Qormi Football Complex	-
Sliema Wanderers F.C.	Sliema	Ta' Qali National Stadium	17.797
Tarxien Rainbows F.C.	Tarxien	Ta' Qali National Stadium	17.797
Valletta F.C.	Valletta	Ta' Qali National Stadium	17.797
Zebbug Rangers F.C.	Zebbug	Zebbug Ground	1.000

== First round ==
=== League table ===
Pos	Team	Pld	W	D	L	GF	GA	GD	Pts
1	Hibernians	22	19	3	0	68	13	+55	60
2	Valletta	22	14	2	6	51	17	+34	44
3	Birkirkara	22	13	4	5	41	22	+19	43
4	Balzan	22	9	7	6	35	33	+2	34
5	Floriana	22	7	8	7	38	41	−3	29
6	Sliema Wanderers	22	7	6	9	26	31	−5	27
7	Mosta	22	7	4	11	24	43	−19	25
8	Naxxar Lions	22	5	7	10	26	34	−8	22
9	Tarxien Rainbows	22	4	9	9	22	38	−16	21
10	Pietà Hotspurs	22	5	6	11	19	36	−17	21
11	Qormi	22	4	6	12	22	38	−16	18
12	Żebbuġ Rangers	22	4	6	12	25	51	−26	18

Source: MFA, uefa.com
Rules for classification: 1) Points; 2) Play-offs (only if needed to decide champions, teams for relegation or teams for UEFA competitions).

=== Results (matches 1-22) ===
Home \ Away	BAL	BIR	FLO	HIB	MOS	NXX	PTA	QOR	SLI	TAR	VAL	ZEB
Balzan	—	3–2	3–2	0–3	1–0	1–3	1–2	1–1	5–3	3–2	0–2	4–2
Birkirkara	0–0	—	1–2	1–1	2–0	1–0	2–1	2–0	1–0	2–1	1–1	3–1
Floriana	1–1	1–2	—	0–3	3–2	4–1	1–1	2–2	2–0	1–1	0–2	3–3
Hibernians	4–0	1–0	5–0	—	1–1	5–1	3–1	2–1	3–1	1–1	3–1	5–2
Mosta	1–0	1–5	1–3	0–5	—	1–2	3–1	3–1	1–2	2–1	1–0	2–0
Naxxar Lions	1–1	1–3	1–1	0–2	1–1	—	4–0	1–1	1–0	0–1	0–3	4–0
Pietà Hotspurs	1–1	4–3	1–3	0–3	0–1	1–1	—	0–0	0–2	0–0	0–3	1–0
Qormi	1–2	0–2	4–2	0–6	4–0	1–0	0–1	—	1–3	1–0	2–3	0–1
Sliema Wanderers	0–0	1–1	1–1	1–2	4–1	0–0	2–1	0–0	—	2–0	0–5	1–0
Tarxien Rainbows	0–5	3–1	1–1	1–4	1–1	2–1	0–0	2–1	1–1	—	0–6	1–2
Valletta	1–2	0–2	4–1	1–2	5–0	2–0	1–2	4–0	3–1	0–0	—	2–0
Zebbug Rangers	1–1	0–4	1–4	0–4	1–1	3–3	2–1	1–1	2–1	3–3	0–2	—

Source: Malta Football Association
Legend: Blue = home team win; Yellow = draw; Red = away team win.

== Second round ==
All teams advance to the second round. Teams keep their records from the first round, but their points from the first round are halved. Teams will play each other once.

=== League table ===
Pos	Team	Pld	W	D	L	GF	GA	GD	Pts	Qualification or relegation
1	Hibernians (C)	33	27	5	1	97	24	+73	56	Qualification for the 2015–16 UEFA Champions League
2	Valletta	33	22	3	8	74	30	+44	47	Qualification for the 2015–16 UEFA Europa League
3	Birkirkara	33	19	7	7	59	31	+28	43	Qualification for the 2015–16 UEFA Europa League
4	Balzan	33	17	8	8	59	45	+14	42	Qualification for the 2015–16 UEFA Europa League
5	Floriana	33	13	11	9	58	51	+7	36	
6	Sliema Wanderers	33	10	9	14	50	56	−6	26	
7	Naxxar Lions	33	9	9	15	40	51	−11	25	
8	Qormi	33	8	9	16	40	55	−15	24	
9	Tarxien Rainbows	33	8	9	16	35	60	−25	23	
10	Mosta (O)	33	9	6	18	38	72	−34	21	Qualification for the Relegation Play-Offs
11	Pietà Hotspurs (R)	33	6	8	19	30	58	−28	16	Relegation to the 2015–16 Maltese First Division
12	Żebbuġ Rangers (R)	33	5	6	22	37	84	−47	12	Relegation to the 2015–16 Maltese First Division

Source: MFA, uefa.com
Rules for classification: 1) points; 2) play-off (only for deciding champion and UEFA competition places).
(C) Champions; (O) Play-off winners; (R) Relegated

=== Results (matches 23-33) ===
Home \ Away	BAL	BIR	FLO	HIB	MOS	NXX	PTA	QOR	SLI	TAR	VAL	ZEB
Balzan	—	—	—	—	1–1	—	—	—	—	—	0–1	4–1
Birkirkara	0–1	—	—	0–0	—	1–0	—	2–2	—	—	—	—
Floriana	—	—	—	1–3	—	4–1	2–0	—	3–1	—	—	—
Hibernians	1–3	—	—	—	—	—	—	2–1	3–2	—	3–1	—
Mosta	—	0–3	2–2	—	—	1–2	—	—	—	—	—	—
Naxxar Lions	1–2	—	—	—	—	—	—	—	4–3	0–1	—	—
Pietà Hotspurs	—	—	—	—	2–3	0–0	—	—	1–1	—	—	3–1
Qormi	1–5	—	—	—	—	—	2–1	—	—	—	1–3	—
Sliema Wanderers	—	—	—	—	5–1	—	—	—	—	3–2	3–3	—
Tarxien Rainbows	—	—	1–2	—	2–1	—	3–1	0–4	—	—	—	—
Valletta	—	2–1	1–0	—	—	—	—	—	—	—	—	2–3
Zebbug Rangers	—	1–3	—	0–5	—	—	—	1–3	—	0–2	—	—

Source: Malta Football Association
Legend: Blue = home team win; Yellow = draw; Red = away team win.

== Premier League play-off ==
A play-off was played between the tenth placed team from the Premier League and the third placed team from the First Division. The winner will compete in the 2015–16 Maltese Premier League.

15 May 2015
19:30

Mosta	2–0	Gżira United
Udo Fortune 88'; Gary Roberts 90+3'	Report

Ta' Qali National Stadium
Attendance: 1,023
Referee: Philip Farrugia

== Top goalscorers ==
As of 10 May 2015

Rank	Player	Team	Goals
1	(Brazil) Edison Luiz dos Santos	Hibernians	25
1	(Brazil) Jorginho	Hibernians	25
3	(Montenegro) Bojan Kaljević	Balzan/Mosta	19
4	(Malta) Clayton Failla	Hibernians	16
5	(Italy) Matteo Picciolo	Floriana	15
5	(Italy) Gianmarco Piccioni	Balzan	15
7	(Brazil) Ellinton Antonio Costa Morais	Birkirkara	13
7	(Brazil) Rafael Ledesma	Birkirkara	13
7	(England) Lateef Elford-Alliyu	Valletta	13
10	(Tunisia) Abdelkarim Nafti	Valletta	12
10	(Slovenia) Vito Plut	Floriana	12
10	(The Gambia) Hamza Barry	Valletta	12
10	(Malta) Alfred Effiong	Qormi	12

Source: MFA
