= Hamid Al Kamali =

Emirati footballer (born 1992)

Personal information
- Full name: Hamid Ismail Mohammed Al Kamali
- Date of birth: 6 November 1992 (age 34)
- Place of birth: United Arab Emirates
- Height: 1.85 m (6 ft 1 in)
- Position: Defender

Youth career
- Al-Wahda

Senior career*
Years	Team	Apps	(Gls)
2012–2016	Al-Wahda	0	(0)
2014–2015	→ Valletta (loan)	4	(0)
2015–2016	→ Al-Shaab (loan)	5	(0)
- * Club domestic league appearances and goals

Hamid Al Kamali (Arabic:حامد الكمالي; born 6 November 1992) is an Emirati footballer. He currently plays as a defender.
