= Denni (footballer) =

Brazilian footballer (born 1982)

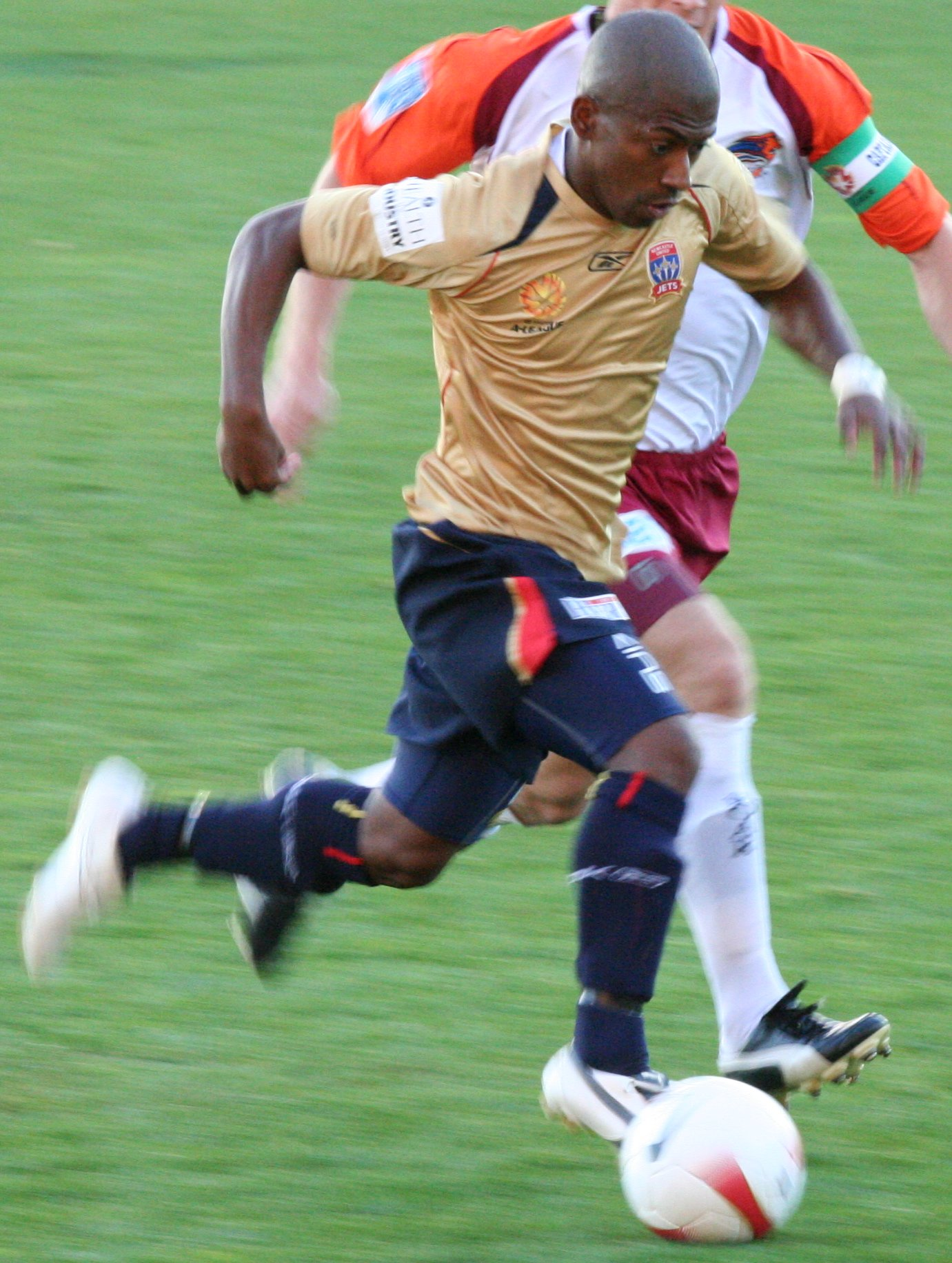

Personal information
- Full name: Denni Rocha dos Santos
- Date of birth: 21 August 1982 (age 44)
- Place of birth: Rio de Janeiro, Brazil
- Height: 5 ft 6 in (1.68 m)
- Position: Attacking midfielder

Team information
- Current team: Valletta
- Number: 21

Senior career*
Years	Team	Apps	(Gls)
2003	Santo André		
2003	→ São Caetano (loan)	11	(1)
2004	→ Montedio Yamagata (loan)	20	(2)
2005	→ Ituano (loan)		
2005–2006	→ Club Tijuana (loan)		
2006	Santo André	13	(2)
2007–2008	Newcastle Jets	19	(1)
2009–2010	Tarxien Rainbows	36	(18)
2010–2015	Valletta	102	(47)
2015–2016	Hibernians	12	(1)
2016–2017	Sliema	35	(10)
2017–	Valletta	11	(5)
- * Club domestic league appearances and goals as of 9 November 2017

Denni Rocha dos Santos, usually known as Denni (born 21 August 1982) is a professional footballer currently playing for Maltese Premier League side Valletta, where he plays as an attacking midfielder.

== Biography ==
=== Club career ===
Denni had a contract with Santo André until 2008, and played for a number of other clubs on loan. Denni trialled with French side RC Strasbourg at the end of 2006 but was unsuccessful in gaining a position at the club. He did not have permission to leave Santo André and the club stated that they would take legal action against him.

The Newcastle Jets formally announced Denni's signing on 17 August 2007 at a press conference in Newcastle. He made his A-League debut on 26 August 2007 against Perth Glory. His only goal came from a cross from Matt Thompson to set him up with a volley against Melbourne Victory. He was released by Newcastle at the end of 2008 after finishing the season as champions. He played for Valletta FC from 2010 to 2015 where he had a lot of success. In July 2015 he joined Hibernians FC. in July 2017 Denni re-signed for Valletta.

== Honours ==
Newcastle Jets

- A-League Championship: 2007–08

Valletta FC

- Maltese Premier League Championship: 2010–11, 2011–12, 2013–14,
