= Djamel Leeflang =

Dutch footballer

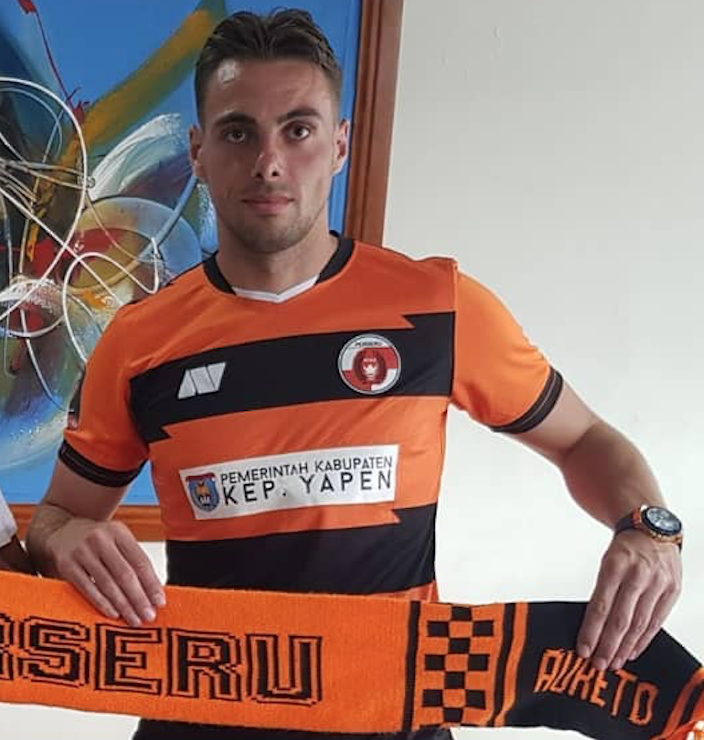
- Djamel Leeflang signing for Indonesian club Perseru Serui

Personal information
- Full name: Djamel Romano Boerstra Leeflang
- Date of birth: 25 March 1992 (age 34)
- Place of birth: Den Haag, Netherlands
- Height: 1.88 m (6 ft 2 in)
- Position: Midfielder

Senior career*
Years	Team	Apps	(Gls)
2008–2009	RSV Hoekpolder	26	(32)
2009–2010	HSV Duno	29	(12)
2010–2011	Vitesse Delft	27	(17)
2011–2012	Deltras	23	(14)
2013–2014	Haaglandia	23	(2)
2014–2015	Valletta	7	(1)
2015–2016	Qormi	26	(6)
2016–2017	New Radiant	17	(7)
2017–2018	Lija Athletic	14	(1)
2018	Perseru Serui	12	(1)
2018–2019	Havant & Waterlooville	5	(0)
2019–2020	Lienden	28	(4)
2020–2021	Quick Boys 2	0	(0)
2021–2022	COAL	0	(0)
- * Club domestic league appearances and goals as of 8 March 2020

Djamel Romano Boerstra Leeflang (born 25 March 1992) is a Dutch professional footballer who plays as a midfielder.

Leeflang born in Utrecht, The Netherlands, started his career in his home country with Vitesse Delft. At 20 years old making his first move overseas, to Indonesia and signing with Premier League side Deltras. His first season in the Liga Indonesia Premier Division was a successful one with massive haul of 14 goals and 8 assists from 23 games, including a hat trick against current Liga 1 club Persib Bandung.

Returning to The Netherlands with VV Haaglandia followed by an unfortunate trial that was cut short due to injury at Dutch Premier League side, Sparta Rotterdam, Leeflang joined Valletta, finishing second in the Premier League and qualifying for the Europa League.

After a season and a half at Qormi Djamel moved to New Radiant Sports Club in the Maldives. A year that ended with New Radiant winning the Dhivehi Premier League and two cup competitions.

The 2017/2018 campaign saw a return to Malta with Lija Athletic who were getting ready for their return to the Maltese Premier League after an 18-year absence.

In February 2018 Leeflang completed a return to Indonesia to play for Perseru Serui in Liga 1. Djamel then returned to Europe to sign a short-term deal with Havant & Waterlooville in November 2018, making 5 appearances.

Before the end of the January 2019 transfer window, Leeflang signed until June 2020 with Lienden.
