= Hamza Barry =

Gambian footballer (born 1994)

Personal information
- Date of birth: 15 October 1994 (age 32)
- Place of birth: Banjul, The Gambia
- Height: 1.78 m (5 ft 10 in)
- Position: Midfielder

Youth career
- –2013: Gambia Ports Authority

Senior career*
Years	Team	Apps	(Gls)
2013–2015	Valletta	48	(14)
2015–2017	Apollon Limassol	0	(0)
2015–2016	→ Maccabi Netanya (loan)	21	(2)
2016	→ Hapoel Tel Aviv (loan)	12	(0)
2016–2017	→ Hajduk Split (loan)	27	(3)
2017–2020	Hajduk Split	84	(4)
2022	LA Galaxy II	18	(0)
2022–2025	Vejle	69	(2)
2025–2026	Al-Zulfi	32	(4)

International career^{‡}
2011	Gambia U17	2	(0)
2011–2012	Gambia U20	7	(0)
2013–	Gambia	24	(1)
- * Club domestic league appearances and goals as of 29 May 2025 ‡ National team caps and goals as of 1 April 2024

Hamza Barry (born 15 October 1994) is a Gambian professional footballer who plays as a midfielder.

== Club career ==
=== Valletta ===
After playing for native side Gambia Ports Authority, Barry joined Maltese side Valletta in 2013. On 18 August 2013, Barry made his Valletta debut in a 2–1 victory over Mosta, playing the full 90 minutes. A few weeks later, Barry scored his first Valletta goal in a 3–2 defeat against Hibernians, scoring Valletta's second. In the 2014–15 campaign, Barry went on to score twelve times in twenty-eight league games, with a brace against four different teams; Pietà Hotspurs, Qormi, Sliema Wanderers and Tarxien Rainbows. by the end of 2014/15 playing season, Hamza was chosen by the Malta FA as the best young player of the year.

=== Apollon Limassol ===
On 1 July 2015, after impressing with Valletta, Barry joined Cypriot side Apollon Limassol on a one-year deal after rejecting a new deal in Malta.

==== Maccabi Netanya (loan) ====
On 14 August 2015, Barry was sent out on loan to Israeli Premier League side Maccabi Netanya. On 22 August 2015, Barry made his Maccabi Netanya debut in a 1–0 defeat against Maccabi Petah Tikva, playing the full 90 minutes. On 12 September 2015, Barry scored his first goal for Maccabi Netanya in a 1–1 draw against Hapoel Tel Aviv, netting in the 58th minute for Maccabi's equalizer. Due to Maccabi Netanya poor start to the campaign, parent club Apollon Limassol terminated Barry's loan, with a move to Hapoel Tel Aviv in mind. He returned to Apollon Limassol after starting twenty-one times and scoring twice for Maccabi Netanya.

==== Hapoel Tel Aviv (loan) ====
On 3 February 2016, Barry joined Hapoel Tel Aviv on loan for the remainder of the 2015–16 campaign. On 7 February 2016, Barry made his Hapoel Tel Aviv debut in a 1–1 draw against Maccabi Tel Aviv, playing the full 90 minutes. Barry went on to start the rest of his eleven appearances with Hapoel Tel Aviv before returning to Cyprus on 30 June 2016.

==== Hajduk Split ====
On 31 August 2016, Barry joined the Croatian team Hajduk Split, on a loan from Apollon Limassol with the option to purchase at the end of the season. Becoming a first team regular, his performances satisfied the club and Hajduk decided to buy his contract out for 250 000€, signing him for further three years. In his four years overall in the club Barry played a total of 133 matches for the Croatian club, scoring ten goals. His last match for the club would be on 26 June 2020, when, in a 2-1 win against Slaven Belupo Barry suffered a cruciate ligament rupture and was substituted off in the 84th minute of the game. He left the club following the expiry of his contract in the end of July 2020, and is due to return to the game following his recovery in the spring of 2021.

=== LA Galaxy II ===
Barry joined USL Championship club LA Galaxy II, reserve team for Major League Soccer side LA Galaxy, ahead of their 2022 season.

=== Vejle ===
On 22 August 2022 it was confirmed, that Barry had joined newly relegated Danish 1st Division side Vejle Boldklub on a deal until June 2024. In 2023 he extended his contract until 2025.

He left the club at the end of his contract in June 2025.

=== Al-Zulfi ===
On 18 August 2025, Barry joined Saudi FDL club Al-Zulfi.

== Personal life ==
Barry is the brother of Abubakr Barry who is also a professional footballer.

== Career statistics ==
As of match played 15 May 2016.

Club	Season	League			Cup		Europe		Other		Total	
Club	Season	Division	Apps	Goals	Apps	Goals	Apps	Goals	Apps	Goals	Apps	Goals
Valletta	2013–14	Maltese Premier League	20	2	4	0	4 (Note: Appearance(s) in UEFA Europa League)	0	—		28	2
Valletta	2014–15	Maltese Premier League	28	12	3	0	0	0	—		31	12
Valletta	Total		48	14	7	0	4	0	—		59	14
Maccabi Netanya (loan)	2015–16	Israeli Premier League	21	2	3	1	—		1 (Note: Appearance(s) in Israel State Cup)	0	25	3
Hapoel Tel Aviv (loan)	2015–16	Israeli Premier League	12	0	0	0	—		0	0	12	0
Career total			81	16	10	1	4	0	1	0	96	17

== Honours ==
Vejle

- Danish 1st Division: 2022–23
