= Ikenna Hilary =

Nigerian footballer (born 1991)

Personal information
- Full name: Ikenna Paul Hilary
- Date of birth: 17 April 1991 (age 35)
- Place of birth: Nigeria
- Height: 1.89 m (6 ft 2 in)
- Position: Defensive midfielder

Team information
- Current team: Kano Pillars

Youth career
- Sunshine Stars

Senior career*
Years	Team	Apps	(Gls)
2012–2013	Lobi Stars	?	(?)
2013–2014	Sunshine Stars	?	(?)
2014–2015	Camacha	11	(1)
2014–2015	Valletta	10	(1)
2016	Skalica	7	(0)
2016–2017	Ifeanyi Ubah	?	(?)
2017	Wolayta Dicha	?	(?)

International career
2014	Nigeria	2	(0)
- * Club domestic league appearances and goals

Ikenna Hillary (born 17 April 1991) is a right-footed Nigerian professional footballer who plays as a defensive midfielder for Warri Wolves F.C. in the Nigeria National League. He was also a member of the Nigeria National Football Team.

== International career ==
In January 2014, coach Stephen Keshi, invited him to be included in the Nigeria 23-man team for the 2014 African Nations Championship. He helped Nigeria defeat Zimbabwe by a goal to nil for third-place finish.
