= Jonathan Caruana =

Maltese footballer

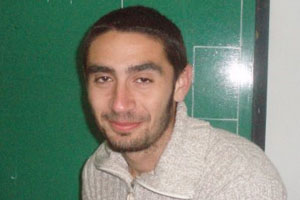

Personal information
- Full name: Jonathan Caruana
- Date of birth: 24 July 1986 (age 40)
- Place of birth: Malta
- Height: 6 ft 0 in (1.83 m)
- Position: Centre back

Senior career*
Years	Team	Apps	(Gls)
2003–2010	Hibernians	72	(3)
2005–2006	→ Mosta (loan)	17	(0)
2010–	Valletta	193	(8)

International career
- Malta U17
- Malta U19
- Malta U21
2008–2019	Malta	46	(2)
- * Club domestic league appearances and goals

Jonathan Caruana (born 24 July 1986) is a professional footballer who plays for Maltese Premier League side Valletta, where he plays as a defender.

On 26 September 2017, Caruana was handed a four-year ban from football. The 31-year-old was provisionally suspended by the Malta Football Association after he returned a positive sample during an out-of-competition test conducted by the National Anti-Doping Organisation (NADO) back in March 2017. In September 2018 after having his ban cut short, he returned to Valletta.

== Playing career ==
=== Hibernians ===
Caruana started his career with Hibernians, and made his debut during the 2003–04 season. Making the transition from youth team to first team, he was only used as a bit part player, and went on to make just one appearance during the season, with Hibernians going on to finish in third position in the Maltese Premier League.

The 2004–05 season, saw Caruana gain a few more first team opportunities. He helped Hibernians to another third-place finish in the Maltese Premier League, with Caruana going on to make four appearances, without scoring and goals.

Caruana still struggled to make his mark in the Hibernians first team, and went into the 2005–06 season hoping to establish himself. Caruana still failed to mark a first team place his own and up to the January transfer window of 2006, he only made one appearance. He was sent out of loan for the remainder of the season to fellow Maltese Premier League team Mosta, who were struggling against relegation. He made 17 appearances, without scoring, but unfortunately Mosta failed to avoid relegation after finishing in ninth position in the Maltese Premier League. Caruana's parent club, Hibernians went on to secure a fourth-place finish.

Caruana returned to Hibernians for the 2006–07 season. The loan move had paid off, as Caruana cemented a first team place, making 19 appearances, but failing to score as Hibernians finished in fifth position in the Maltese Premier League. He did gain his first taste of success as Hibernians secured the Maltese Cup for the second consecutive season.

The 2007–08 season turned out to be a very disappointing one for Hibernians, as the club finished the first phase of the season in the relegation pool, before finishing the season in seventh position. Caruana went on to make 21 appearances, but failed to score any goals. However, the club won the Maltese Super Cup. Caruana's form did however not go unnoticed, as he received his first cap for the Maltese national team during the season.

Hibernians went from one extreme to the other during the 2008–09 season. Under the guidance of new manager Mark Miller, the club shocked the critics and beat Valletta by two points to win the Maltese Premier League title. Caruana made 26 appearances and chipped in with three goals.

Caruana hoped to help Hibernians retain the Maltese Premier League title for the 2009–10, however the quest took some severe setbacks, as Hibernians sold the Maltese Player of the Year, Clayton Failla to Sliema Wanderers, and striker, Terence Scerri joined Valletta.

In July 2021, Caruana retired after making over 300 Maltese Premier League appearances.

== Honours ==
Hibernians

- Maltese Premier League: 2008–09
- Maltese FA Trophy: 2007
- Maltese Super Cup: 2007

Valletta

- Maltese Super Cup: 2011, 2012
- Maltese Premier League: 2010–11, 2011–12

=== Individual ===
- Malta Football Awards
  - Best Defence
    - Winner: 2010–2011 with Valletta F.C.
    - Winner: 2011–2012 with Valletta F.C.

== Career statistics ==
Statistics accurate as of match played 9 August 2009.

Club performance			League		Cup		League Cup		Continental		Total	
Season	Club	League	Apps	Goals	Apps	Goals	Apps	Goals	Apps	Goals	Apps	Goals
Malta			League		Maltese Cup		League Cup		Europe		Total	
2003–04	Hibernians	Maltese Premier League	1	0	0	0	0	0	0	0	1	0
2004–05	Hibernians	Maltese Premier League	4	0	0	0	0	0	0	0	4	0
2005–06	Hibernians	Maltese Premier League	1	0	0	0	0	0	0	0	1	0
2005–06	Mosta (loan)	Maltese Premier League	17	0	0	0	0	0	0	0	17	0
2006–07	Hibernians	Maltese Premier League	19	0	0	0	0	0	0	0	19	0
2007–08	Hibernians	Maltese Premier League	21	0	0	0	0	0	0	0	21	0
2008–09	Hibernians	Maltese Premier League	26	3	0	0	0	0	0	0	26	3
2009–10	Hibernians	Maltese Premier League	0	0	0	0	0	0	0	0	0	0
Total	Malta		89	3	0	0	0	0	0	0	89	3
Career total			89	3	0	0	0	0	0	0	89	3

=== International ===
Appearances and goals by national team and year
National team	Year	Apps	Goals
Malta	2008	3	0
Malta	2009	6	0
Malta	2010	6	0
Malta	2011	6	0
Malta	2012	4	1
Malta	2013	6	1
Malta	2014	3	0
Malta	2015	2	0
Malta	2016	4	0
Malta	2017	–	
Malta	2018	2	0
Malta	2019	4	0
Total		46	2

Scores and results list Malta's goal tally first, score column indicates score after each Caruana goal.

List of international goals scored by Jonathan Caruana
No.	Date	Venue	Opponent	Score	Result	Competition
1	14 November 2012	Rheinpark Stadion, Vaduz, Liechtenstein	Liechtenstein	1–0	1–0	Friendly
2	19 November 2013	Ta' Qali National Stadium, Ta' Qali, Malta	Faroe Islands	3–0	3–2	Friendly
