= Samir Arab =

Maltese footballer

Personal information
- Full name: Samir Arab
- Date of birth: 25 March 1994 (age 32)
- Place of birth: Malta
- Position: Defender

Team information
- Current team: Balzan
- Number: 5

Senior career*
Years	Team	Apps	(Gls)
2010–2018	Valletta	1	(0)
2012–2014	→ Vittoriosa Stars (loan)	30+	(1+)
2014–2018	→ Balzan (loan)	78	(3)
2020–	Balzan	124	(5)

International career^{‡}
2011–2012	Malta U19	6	(0)
2013–2016	Malta U21	9	(0)
2020–	Malta	1	(0)
- * Club domestic league appearances and goals as of 21 April 2026 ‡ National team caps and goals as of 15:42, 7 October 2020 (UTC)

Samir Arab (born 25 March 1994) is a Maltese footballer who plays as a defender for Balzan and the Malta national team.

== Career ==
Arab made his international debut for Malta on 7 October 2020 in a friendly match against Gibraltar.

== Career statistics ==
=== International ===
As of 7 October 2020

Malta
Year	Apps	Goals
2020	1	0
Total	1	0
