= 2015–16 Maltese Premier League =

Maltese Premier League
- Season: 2015–16
- Champions: Valletta (23rd title)
- Relegated: Qormi; Naxxar Lions
- Champions League: Valletta
- Europa League: Hibernians; Birkirkara
- Matches: 198
- Goals: 632 (3.19 per match)
- Biggest home win: Balzan 8–0 Naxxar Lions
- Biggest away win: Naxxar Lions 0–8 Hibernians
- Highest scoring: Birkirkara 6–3 Mosta

The 2015–16 Maltese Premier League was the 101st season of the Maltese Premier League. The season began on 21 August 2015 and concluded on 30 April 2016. Hibernians were the defending champions, having won their 11th title the previous season.

The Maltese Premier League consisted of three rounds, for a total of 33 matches per team, with the first two rounds played between 21 August 2015 and 14 February 2016, and the third and final round played from 20 February to 30 April 2016. After the end of the second round, the points earned were halved.

== Format ==
The format for the 2015–16 Maltese Premier League was the same as the previous season. First all teams meet twice in a round-robin format for a total of 22 matches. After the two first rounds all teams advanced to a second phase where half of the points from the first two rounds were carried over and teams played each other once. These rules were changed before the previous season after a decision not to split the teams for a championship round and relegation round.

== Venues ==
2015–16 Maltese Premier League is located in Malta	Ta' Qali	Ta' Qali	Paola	Hamrun
2015–16 Maltese Premier League is located in Malta	Ta' Qali National Stadium	Centenary Stadium	Tony Bezzina Stadium	Victor Tedesco Stadium
2015–16 Maltese Premier League is located in Malta	Capacity: 16,997	Capacity: 3,000	Capacity: 2,968	Capacity: 1,962

== Teams and stadiums ==
Location of teams in 2015–16 Maltese Premier League

Pietà Hotspurs and Żebbuġ Rangers were relegated after they finished eleventh and twelfth, respectively, the previous season. Pembroke Athleta, the 2014–15 First Division champion, made their debut in the Premier League. Runner-up St. Andrews returned to the highest level for the first time since the 1993–94 season.

Club	City	Stadium	Capacity
Balzan	Balzan	Victor Tedesco Stadium	6,000
Birkirkara	Birkirkara	Ta' Qali National Stadium	17,797
Floriana	Floriana	Independence Arena	3,000
Hibernians	Paola	Hibernians Ground	8,000
Mosta	Mosta	Charles Abela Memorial Stadium	600
Naxxar Lions	Naxxar	Centenary Stadium	2,000
Pembroke Athleta	Pembroke	Sirens Stadium	1,500
Qormi	Qormi	Qormi Ground	1,000
Sliema Wanderers	Sliema	Tigne Sports Complex	1,000
St. Andrews	St. Andrew's	Luxol Sports Ground	800
Tarxien Rainbows	Tarxien	Tony Cassar Sports Ground	1,000
Valletta	Valletta	Centenary Stadium	2,000

Source: Scoresway

== First round ==
=== League table ===
Pos	Team	Pld	W	D	L	GF	GA	GD	Pts
1	Valletta	22	17	2	3	49	21	+28	53
2	Hibernians	22	15	5	2	53	25	+28	50
3	Balzan	22	14	3	5	42	21	+21	45
4	Birkirkara	22	12	6	4	41	20	+21	42
5	Floriana	22	12	3	7	36	25	+11	39
6	Tarxien Rainbows	22	10	7	5	37	17	+20	37
7	Mosta	22	8	6	8	29	33	−4	30
8	Pembroke Athleta	22	7	4	11	33	39	−6	25
9	Sliema Wanderers	22	7	3	12	31	36	−5	24
10	Naxxar Lions	22	4	2	16	22	54	−32	14
11	Qormi	22	2	3	17	19	49	−30	9
12	St. Andrews	22	1	2	19	14	66	−52	5

Source: MFA, Soccerway
Rules for classification: 1) Points; 2) Play-offs (only if needed to decide champions, teams for relegation or teams for UEFA competitions).

=== Results (matches 1–22) ===
Home \ Away	BAL	BIR	FLO	HIB	MOS	NXX	PEM	QOR	SLI	StA	TAR	VAL
Balzan	—	1–0	1–0	1–1	4–1	4–2	5–1	1–0	1–0	5–1	0–0	1–2
Birkirkara	4–1	—	0–0	0–2	1–1	4–0	3–0	1–0	2–0	4–0	1–0	1–2
Floriana	2–0	0–0	—	2–4	1–2	2–1	4–2	3–0	3–0	3–2	0–3	1–2
Hibernians	3–2	1–1	2–1	—	1–4	4–1	2–1	4–2	2–1	3–0	2–0	1–0
Mosta	1–3	0–3	0–1	0–4	—	0–2	3–3	1–0	1–2	3–1	0–0	2–2
Naxxar Lions	0–2	2–2	0–1	0–7	0–1	—	1–5	1–1	1–2	0–1	0–5	1–2
Pembroke Athleta	0–0	1–4	1–2	1–1	0–2	2–0	—	0–0	0–2	4–3	1–2	2–3
Qormi	0–5	1–2	0–1	1–2	1–3	0–5	1–2	—	3–6	3–0	1–4	0–2
Sliema Wanderers	0–2	1–3	1–2	2–2	1–1	1–2	1–0	0–0	—	6–1	0–2	2–4
St. Andrews	0–2	1–3	0–5	2–2	0–3	1–2	0–4	0–4	0–1	—	1–1	0–3
Tarxien Rainbows	3–0	2–2	1–1	0–1	0–0	4–0	0–1	4–0	3–2	1–0	—	1–3
Valletta	0–1	4–0	3–1	3–2	3–0	3–1	0–2	2–1	0–0	4–0	1–1	—

Source: Malta Football Association
Legend: Blue = home team win; Yellow = draw; Red = away team win.

== Second round ==
All teams advanced to the second round. Teams kept their records from the first round, but their points from the first round were halved and rounded. Teams played each other once.

=== League table ===
Pos	Team	Pld	W	D	L	GF	GA	GD	Pts	Qualification or relegation
1	Valletta (C)	33	25	4	4	69	27	+42	53	Qualification for the 2016–17 UEFA Champions League
2	Hibernians	33	22	8	3	85	33	+52	49	Qualification for the 2016–17 UEFA Europa League
3	Birkirkara	33	20	8	5	64	29	+35	47	Qualification for the 2016–17 UEFA Europa League
4	Balzan	33	20	6	7	69	33	+36	44	Qualification for the 2016–17 UEFA Europa League
5	Floriana	33	18	4	11	60	42	+18	39	
6	Tarxien Rainbows	33	15	8	10	59	31	+28	35	
7	Sliema Wanderers (Note: Sliema Wanderers would have qualified for the 2016–17 UEFA Europa League by winning the 2015–16 Maltese FA Trophy, but failed to obtain a UEFA licence.)	33	12	6	15	49	51	−2	30	
8	Pembroke Athleta	33	10	6	17	48	61	−13	24	
9	Mosta	33	10	7	16	42	60	−18	22	
10	St. Andrews (O)	33	4	3	26	32	90	−58	13	Qualification for the Relegation Play-Offs
11	Naxxar Lions (R)	33	5	4	24	29	95	−66	12	Relegation to the 2016–17 Maltese First Division
12	Qormi (R)	33	3	4	26	26	80	−54	9	Relegation to the 2016–17 Maltese First Division

Source: MFA, Soccerway
Rules for classification: 1) Points; 2) Play-offs (only if needed to decide champions, teams for relegation or teams for UEFA competitions).
(C) Champions; (O) Play-off winners; (R) Relegated

=== Results (matches 23–33) ===
Home \ Away	BAL	BIR	FLO	HIB	MOS	NXX	PEM	QOR	SLI	StA	TAR	VAL
Balzan	—	1–1	—	—	—	8–0	2–1	—	—	1–0	2–2	1–2
Birkirkara	—	—	0–1	2–1	6–3	—	—	2–0	2–1	—	—	—
Floriana	0–2	—	—	—	—	4–0	2–3	—	—	3–1	2–3	2–0
Hibernians	3–1	—	3–1	—	3–0	—	—	6–0	1–1	—	—	—
Mosta	0–3	—	2–4	—	—	—	3–5	—	—	1–1	—	1–2
Naxxar Lions	—	0–4	—	0–8	2–1	—	1–1	1–1	—	—	0–3	—
Pembroke Athleta	—	0–1	—	1–1	—	—	—	3–1	0–2	—	0–4	—
Qormi	0–3	—	1–3	—	0–1	—	—	—	1–0	2–4	—	0–2
Sliema Wanderers	3–3	—	2–2	—	1–0	4–2	—	—	—	3–1	—	0–3
St. Andrews	—	1–3	—	1–4	—	3–1	3–1	—	—	—	2–3	—
Tarxien Rainbows	—	1–2	—	0–1	0–1	—	—	6–1	0–1	—	—	—
Valletta	—	0–0	—	1–1	—	4–0	2–0	—	—	2–1	2–0	—

Source: Malta Football Association
Legend: Blue = home team win; Yellow = draw; Red = away team win.

== Relegation play-offs ==
A play-off match took place between St. Andrews, the tenth-placed team from the Premier League and Senglea Athletic, the third-placed team from the First Division for a place in the 2016–17 Maltese Premier League.

6 May 2016
19:30

St. Andrews	2–1	Senglea Athletic
Pena Beltre 52'; Nwoko 86'	Report	Dalli 20' (pen.)

Hibernians Ground
Referee: Malcolm Spiteri

== Top goalscorers ==
As of 12 April 2016

Rank	Player	Team	Goals
1	(Malta) Lydon Micallef	Balzan	17
2	(Malta) Alfred Effiong	Balzan	16
3	(Italy) Mario Fontanella	Floriana	15
4	(Brazil) Gilmar Da Silva Ribeiro	Hibernians	14
4	(Argentina) Federico Falcone	Valletta	14
5	(Malta) Michael Mifsud	Valletta	12
5	(Tunisia) Abdelkarim Nafti	Valletta	12
5	(Brazil) Jorge Da Silva Pereira	Hibernians	12

Source: MFA
