= Christian Caruana =

Maltese international footballer

Personal information
- Date of birth: 21 October 1986 (age 40)
- Place of birth: Floriana, Malta
- Position: Winger

Senior career*
Years	Team	Apps	(Gls)
2004–2014	Floriana	161	(29)
2012–2013	→ Balzan (loan)	26	(3)
2014–2015	Valletta	5	(0)
2015	Gżira United	9	(0)
2016	Ħamrun Spartans	3	(0)
2016–2018	Sirens	40	(11)
2018–2019	Qrendi	20	(3)
2019–2020	Marsa		
2020–2022	Msida Saint-Joseph		
Total		264	(46)

International career
2011	Malta	2	(0)
- * Club domestic league appearances and goals

Christian Caruana (born 21 October 1986) is a Maltese retired footballer who played as a winger.

== Club career ==
Caruana began his career with Floriana during the 2004–05 season. He joined Valletta in 2014.

== International career ==
He made his international debut for Malta in an August 2011 friendly match against the Central African Republic, coming on as a 54th-minute substitute for André Schembri , and earned his second and final cap two months later against Israel.

== Honours ==
- FA Trophy: 1

2011
