= Pietro Marino =

Italian footballer

Personal information
- Full name: Pietro Demetrio Marino
- Date of birth: 21 November 1986 (age 39)
- Place of birth: Reggio Calabria, Italy
- Height: 2.00 m (6 ft 7 in)
- Position: Goalkeeper

Team information
- Current team: ASD Bocale Calcio ADMO

Youth career
- Reggina

Senior career*
Years	Team	Apps	(Gls)
2006–2013	Reggina	33	(0)
2007–2008	→ Castelnuovo (loan)	22	(0)
2010–2011	→ Cosenza (loan)	11	(0)
2012	→ Barletta (loan)	1	(0)
2013–2014	Valletta	7	(0)
2014–2015	Monopoli	0	(0)
2015	Valletta	9	(0)
2015–2017	Vigor Lamezia		
2017–2018	ASD Corigliano		
2018–2021	ASD Reggiomediterranea		
2022-	ASD Bocale Calcio ADMO		
- * Club domestic league appearances and goals as of 3 January 2018

Pietro Marino (born 21 November 1986 in Reggio Calabria) is an Italian professional football player who currently plays for ASD Bocale Calcio ADMO

== Career ==
He made his Serie A debut for Reggina Calcio on 31 May 2009 when he started the game against A.C. Siena.

In the 2009/10 Serie B season he became the first-choice goalkeeper for Reggina in December 2009. The first-choice goalkeeper for the first half of the season, Mario Cassano, was on loan from Piacenza Calcio, and that loan ended; the two goalkeepers who were ahead of Marino on the depth chart in the previous, 2008/09 season, Andrea Campagnolo and Christian Puggioni left the team in the off-season.

Now is the first-choice goalkeeper of ASD Bocale Calcio ADMO
