= Jason Vandelannoite =

Belgian footballer

Personal information
- Full name: Jason Lee Vandelannoite
- Date of birth: 6 November 1986 (age 40)
- Place of birth: Roeselare, Belgium
- Height: 1.78 m (5 ft 10 in)
- Position: Defender

Team information
- Current team: Torhout 1992 KM

Senior career*
Years	Team	Apps	(Gls)
2005–2007	Club Brugge	25	(0)
2007–2008	Bursaspor	9	(0)
2008–2009	Tubize	28	(5)
2009–2010	Sheffield United		
2010–2011	Qormi	20	(1)
2012	Hibernians	19	(2)
2012–2013	Valletta	25	(1)
2013–2014	Universitatea Craiova	12	(0)
2014–2015	KRC Gent-Zeehaven	23	(1)
2015–2016	KFC Sparta Petegem	30	(2)
2018	St. Andrews	12	(0)
2018–	Torhout 1992 KM		

International career^{‡}
2002–2003	Belgium U17	14	(1)
2003–2004	Belgium U18	10	(1)
2004–2005	Belgium U19	8	(2)
2007	Belgium U20	1	(0)
2005–2008	Belgium U21	13	(0)
- * Club domestic league appearances and goals ‡ National team caps and goals as of 28 December 2015

Jason Lee Vandelannoite (born 6 November 1986) is a Belgian professional footballer who plays as a defender for Torhout 1992 KM. He previously played for Club Brugge, Bursaspor, A.F.C. Tubize, Sheffield United, Qormi, Hibernians, Valletta, Universitatea Craiova, KRC Gent-Zeehaven, KFC Sparta Petegem, and St. Andrews.

== Career ==
Vandelannoite featured in the Champions League group stage with Club Brugge, in a 1–1 draw with Bundesliga side Bayern Munich, where he played the whole 90 minutes. He also represented Belgium in the UEFA European Under-17 Championship (First qualifying round)

Before playing for Hibernians F.C., Vandelannoite played for Qormi F.C. in Malta. Upon his release by Hibernians he joined Valletta F.C.
