= Abdelkarim Nafti =

Tunisian footballer

Karim Nafti
Personal information
- Full name: Abdelkarim Nafti
- Date of birth: August 3, 1981 (age 45)
- Place of birth: Sfax, Tunisia
- Height: 1.76 m (5 ft 9 in)
- Position: Attacking midfielder

Senior career*
Years	Team	Apps	(Gls)
2002–2010	CS Sfaxien		
2008	→ Al-Nassr (loan)		
2010–2011	Al-Merreikh	7	(0)
2012–2013	Club Africain	31	(2)
2013–2016	Valletta	89	(34)
2016–2017	Balzan F.C.	26	(5)

International career^{‡}
2006–2007	Tunisia	9	(1)
- * Club domestic league appearances and goals as of 3 September 2016 ‡ National team caps and goals as of 23 June 2006

Abdelkarim Nafti (Arabic: عبدالكريم نفطي) (born 3 August 1981 in Sfax) is a Tunisian football player. He plays as an attacking midfielder or sometimes a winger . He can also plays as a striker.

He joined African giants Al-Merrikh in 2009. His first goal for El-Merreikh was against Hilal Kadougli when El-Merreikh won 2-4 in Kadougli. In August 2013, he moved to Maltese side Valletta F.C. from Club Africain.

Nafti also played for CS Sfaxien and Al-Nasr in Saudi Arabia.

In addition, he played for the Tunisia national football team.

== Honors ==
=== Domestic ===
- Tunisian League
  - 2005
- Tunisian Cup
  - 2005, 2009
- Tunisian League Cup
  - 2003
- Maltese Premier League
  - 2014, 2016
- Maltese FA Trophy
  - 2014

=== International ===
- CAF Confederation Cup:
  - 2007, 2008
- Arab Club Champions Cup
  - 2004
- North African Cup Winners Cup
  - 2009
