= Edmond Agius =

Maltese footballer

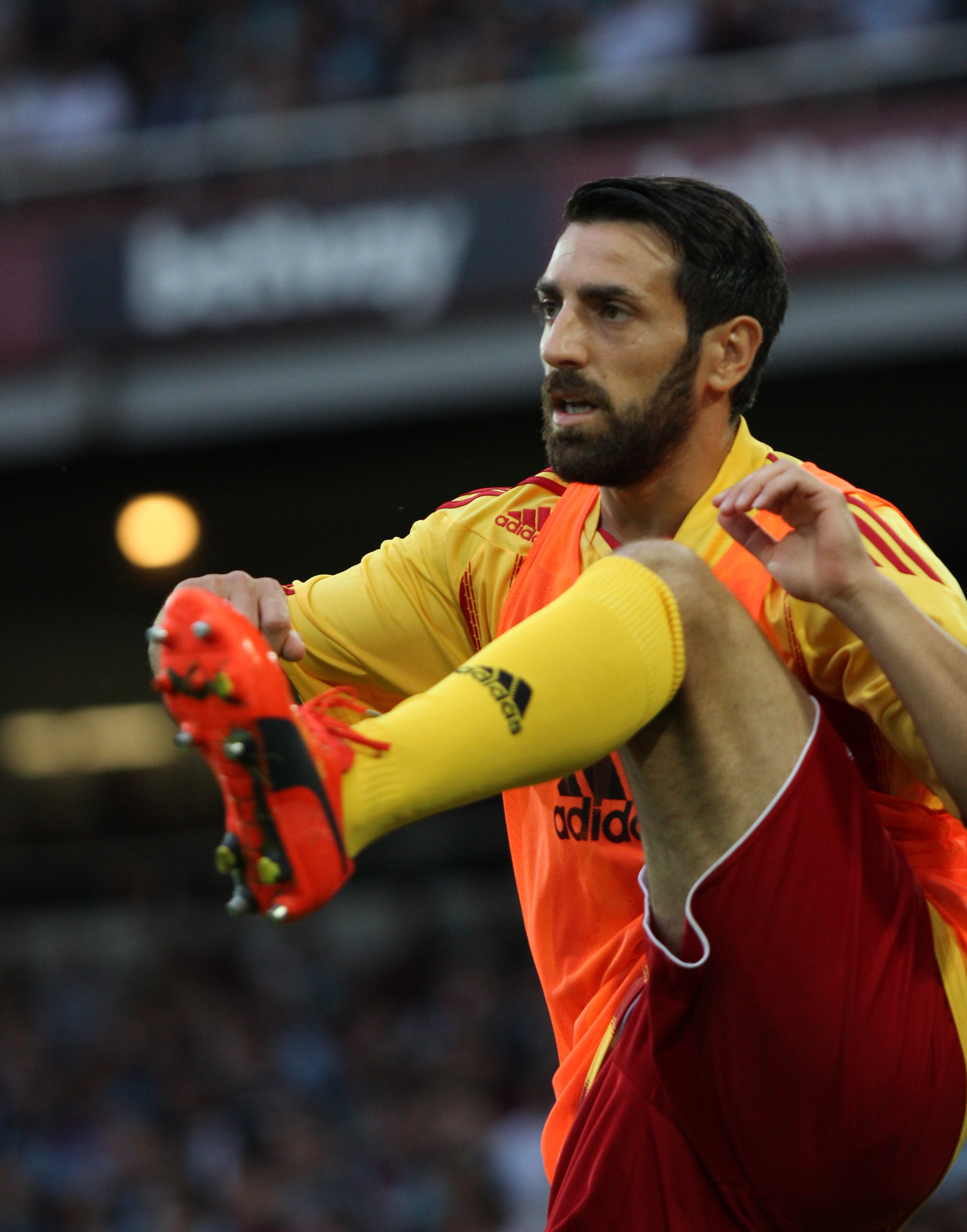

Personal information
- Date of birth: 23 February 1987 (age 39)
- Place of birth: Malta
- Position: Midfielder

Team information
- Current team: Sliema Wanderers
- Number: 8

Youth career
- Hibernians

Senior career*
Years	Team	Apps	(Gls)
2005–2008	Hibernians	41	(3)
2008–2014	Valletta	144	(16)
2014–2017	Birkirkara	60	(5)
2017–	Sliema Wanderers	158	(5)

International career^{‡}
2012–	Malta	2	(0)
- * Club domestic league appearances and goals as of 18 May 2026 ‡ National team caps and goals as of 14 July 2014

Edmond Agius (born 23 February 1987) is Maltese professional footballer currently playing for the Maltese Premier League side Sliema Wanderers, where he plays as a midfielder.

== Playing career ==
=== Hiberians ===
A product of the Hibernians Youth Nursery, Edmond made his debut in the Premier League in season 2005.

=== Valletta ===
Edmond Agius joined Valletta in June 2008.

=== Birkirkara ===
Edmond Aguis joined Birkirkara in June 2014.

== Honours ==
=== Hibernians ===
Winner

- 2008–09 Maltese Premier League
- 2007 Maltese Cup
- 2007–08 Maltese Super Cup

=== Valletta ===
Winner

- 2010–11 Maltese Super Cup
- 2010–11, 2013–14 Maltese Premier League
- 2011–12 Maltese Super Cup

=== Birkirkara ===
Winner

- 2014–15 Maltese Cup
