= Lateef Elford-Alliyu =

English footballer

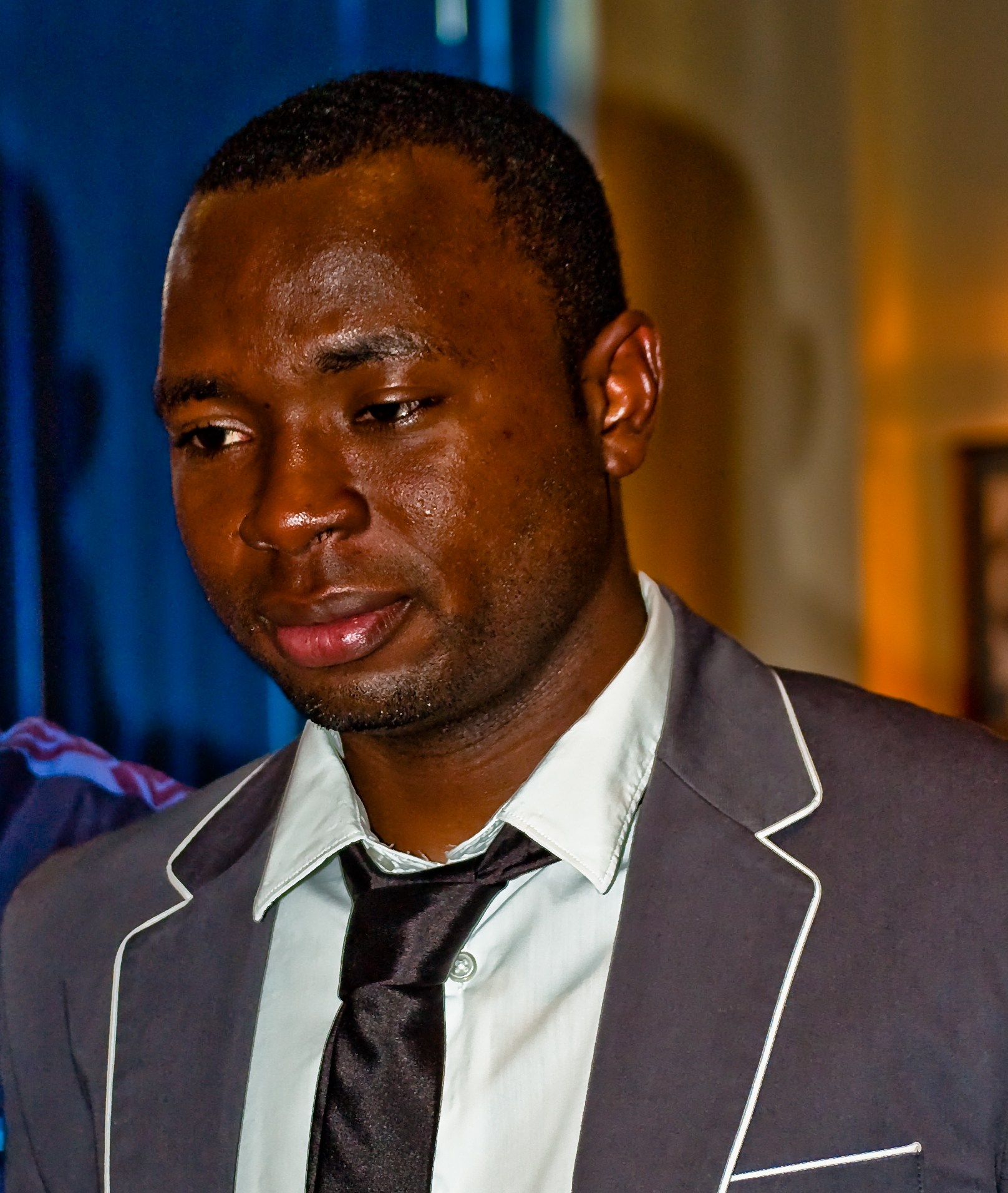

Personal information
- Date of birth: 1 June 1992 (age 34)
- Place of birth: Ibadan, Nigeria
- Height: 1.73 m (5 ft 8 in)
- Position: Forward

Youth career
- 2006–2010: West Bromwich Albion

Senior career*
Years	Team	Apps	(Gls)
2010–2012	West Bromwich Albion	0	(0)
2010	→ Hereford United (loan)	1	(0)
2010	→ Keflavík (loan)	0	(0)
2010–2011	→ Tranmere Rovers (loan)	16	(5)
2012	→ Tranmere Rovers (loan)	4	(0)
2012	→ Bury (loan)	13	(2)
2012	Bury	5	(0)
2013	Crawley Town	6	(0)
2013	Tamworth	11	(2)
2013–2015	Valletta	35	(17)
2015	Coventry City	2	(0)
Total		91	(26)

International career
2009	England U17	9	(1)
- * Club domestic league appearances and goals

Lateef Elford-Alliyu (born 1 June 1992) is a Nigerian-English former professional footballer who played as a forward.

== Playing career ==
=== West Bromwich Albion ===
'Pan' as he was known to his teammates at West Bromwich Albion was catapulted into the limelight after scoring from the half-way line in a pre-season friendly against Stafford Rangers aged 15. Having made his way through the youth teams at West Bromwich Albion, he featured regularly for their Under 18 team before joining Hereford United on loan in late January 2010. He made his debut in the Football League for his loan club on 30 January 2010 in a 2–0 defeat to Port Vale, this being his sole appearance for the club. On 24 February 2010 he returned to his parent club after the end of his loan period. After regularly appearing for the Baggies' reserve side, he joined Icelandic top flight side Keflavík Football Club on 14 May 2010 until the middle of June on loan along with fellow West Bromwich Albion player Kayleden Brown.

=== Tranmere Rovers ===
Elford-Alliyu joined Tranmere Rovers on loan on 25 November 2010. His debut for the club came on 11 December in a 1–2 home defeat to Leyton Orient. His loan period was then extended until 4 January 2011 and then to early February. He scored his first goal for the club on 8 January against Walsall. He scored his first brace of his career in a 2–1 win over Plymouth Argyle on 12 February 2011.

After picking up an injury which would keep him out for the rest of the season he returned on 24 March 2011 to his parent club for treatment, ending his loan period. He rejoined Tranmere for a second loan spell in January 2012, for an initial one-month period.

=== Bury ===
On 20 February 2012, Elford-Alliyu joined Football League One side Bury on loan until the end of the season. Five days later on 25 February 2012, Elford-Alliyu scored on his debut in a 1–1 draw against Leyton Orient. His second goal came on 24 March 2012, in a 1–1 draw against Preston North End.

On 16 May 2012, Elford-Alliyu was released by West Bromwich Albion; the club having decided not to exercise its one-year option on his contract. On 3 July 2012, he signed for Bury on a one-year deal. However, he made only five appearances and his first team opportunities were limited under new manager Kevin Blackwell, who was Richie Barker successor after Barker left to manage Crawley Town; this would later become Elford-Alliyu's future club.

=== Crawley Town ===
After a year at Gigg Lane, Elford-Alliyu signed for Crawley Town on a free transfer. He made his debut for the club, coming on as a substitute for Mike Jones, in a FA Cup third round match as Crawley Town lose 3–1 against Reading; on 12 January 2013, he made his league debut, coming on as a substitute for Nicky Adams in a 2–0 loss against Tranmere Rovers.

=== Tamworth ===
On 31 August 2013, Elford-Alliyu signed a one-year deal with Conference National side Tamworth, following his release from Crawley Town.

=== Coventry City ===
After spending the 2014–15 season with Maltese side Valletta, Elford-Alliyu signed a four-month contract with Coventry City on 1 September 2015.

== International career ==
He made 9 appearances for the England national under-17 football team in 2009 scoring one goal including going to the European championship making two starts and one substitute appearance.
