= 2013–14 Maltese Premier League =

Maltese Premier League
- Season: 2013–14
- Champions: Valletta (22nd title)
- Relegated: Vittoriosa Stars; Rabat Ajax
- Champions League: Valletta
- Europa League: Birkirkara; Hibernians
- Matches: 54
- Goals: 159 (2.94 per match)
- Top goalscorer: Jhonnattann; Stanley Ohawuchi; Edison (21 goals)

The 2013–14 Maltese Premier League was the 99th season of the Maltese Premier League, the top-tier football league in Malta. It began on 16 August 2013 and ended on 26 April 2014. Birkirkara are the defending champions, having won their 4th title the previous season.

The Premier League consisted of two rounds. In the First Round, every team played each opponent twice, once "home" and once "away" (in actuality, the designation of home and away were purely arbitrary as most of the clubs did not have their own grounds), for a total of 22 games. The league then split into two pools. Earned points are subsequently halved. Teams that finished in the positions 1–6 competed in the "Top Six" and teams that finished in positions 7–12 played in the "Play-out".

== Teams ==
=== Relegation and promotion ===
Ħamrun Spartans and Melita were relegated finishing 11th and 12th, respectively, in the previous season.

Promoted were, Naxxar Lions and Vittoriosa Stars finishing 1st and 2nd, respectively, in the First Division the previous season.

== Venues ==
2013–14 Maltese Premier League is located in Malta	Ta' Qali	Ta' Qali	Paola	Hamrun
2013–14 Maltese Premier League is located in Malta	Ta' Qali National Stadium	Centenary Stadium	Tony Bezzina Stadium	Victor Tedesco Stadium
2013–14 Maltese Premier League is located in Malta	Capacity: 16,997	Capacity: 3,000	Capacity: 2,968	Capacity: 1,962

== Locations ==
Location of teams in 2013–14 Maltese Premier League

== First phase ==
=== League table ===
Pos	Team	Pld	W	D	L	GF	GA	GD	Pts	Qualification
1	Birkirkara	22	18	2	2	51	19	+32	56	Qualification for the Top Six
2	Valletta	22	17	2	3	51	13	+38	53	Qualification for the Top Six
3	Hibernians	22	15	2	5	57	27	+30	47	Qualification for the Top Six
4	Sliema Wanderers	22	12	7	3	43	24	+19	43	Qualification for the Top Six
5	Mosta	22	12	2	8	44	35	+9	38	Qualification for the Top Six
6	Balzan	22	8	4	10	24	31	−7	28	Qualification for the Top Six
7	Naxxar Lions	22	8	3	11	27	39	−12	27	Qualification for the Play-out
8	Floriana (Note: Floriana deducted 6 points.)	22	8	4	10	30	36	−6	22	Qualification for the Play-out
9	Vittoriosa Stars	22	5	3	14	24	47	−23	18	Qualification for the Play-out
10	Qormi	22	4	4	14	28	45	−17	16	Qualification for the Play-out
11	Tarxien Rainbows	22	4	4	14	26	45	−19	16	Qualification for the Play-out
12	Rabat Ajax	22	1	3	18	17	61	−44	6	Qualification for the Play-out

Source: FIFA
Rules for classification: 1) Points; 2) Play-offs (only if needed to decide champions, teams for relegation or teams for UEFA competitions).

=== Results ===
Home \ Away	BAL	BIR	FLO	HIB	MOS	NXX	QOR	RAB	SLI	TAR	VAL	VIT
Balzan	—	1–2	0–0	0–2	1–3	0–3	1–0	2–0	0–1	3–2	1–1	2–1
Birkirkara	2–1	—	3–0	0–1	2–1	7–1	1–1	4–2	1–1	1–0	1–2	2–0
Floriana	1–2	1–3	—	0–4	2–1	1–0	3–0	3–2	0–1	1–2	0–2	2–1
Hibernians	1–0	1–2	2–2	—	2–3	4–1	5–3	4–1	2–2	0–1	3–2	5–1
Mosta	0–2	1–3	1–0	0–2	—	4–0	1–2	4–0	3–2	2–2	0–6	2–0
Naxxar Lions	0–1	0–1	1–1	0–3	2–4	—	1–3	3–0	2–2	3–1	2–1	1–1
Qormi	1–2	1–3	2–2	1–4	2–3	1–2	—	0–0	1–3	3–0	0–1	1–2
Rabat Ajax	2–2	1–2	0–4	1–4	0–3	1–2	0–0	—	1–2	2–6	1–4	0–1
Sliema Wanderers	3–0	1–3	4–1	3–1	1–1	2–0	4–0	4–1	—	3–3	0–3	2–0
Tarxien Rainbows	3–1	1–3	1–3	0–1	0–1	0–2	2–6	0–1	0–0	—	0–3	0–3
Valletta	1–0	0–1	3–0	2–1	2–1	1–0	4–0	6–1	0–0	2–1	—	2–1
Vittoriosa Stars	2–2	1–4	1–3	2–5	2–5	0–1	1–0	1–0	1–2	2–2	0–4	—

Source: Malta Football Association
Legend: Blue = home team win; Yellow = draw; Red = away team win.

== Second phase ==
=== Top Six ===
Pos	Team	Pld	W	D	L	GF	GA	GD	Pts	Qualification	VAL	BIR	HIB	MOS	SLI	BAL
1	Valletta (C)	32	24	5	3	74	21	+53	51	Qualification for the 2014–15 UEFA Champions League	—	0–0	3–2	2–2	1–1	1–0
2	Birkirkara	32	25	3	4	76	25	+51	50	Qualification for the 2014–15 UEFA Europa League	0–2	—	0–1	4–0	6–0	1–0
3	Hibernians	32	18	4	10	77	51	+26	35	Qualification for the 2014–15 UEFA Europa League	1–3	1–4	—	2–2	1–3	4–2
4	Mosta	32	15	6	11	58	57	+1	32		0–5	0–4	2–1	—	1–1	3–1
5	Sliema Wanderers	32	14	10	8	54	42	+12	31	Qualification for the 2014–15 UEFA Europa League (Note: Sliema Wanderers qualified for the 2014–15 UEFA Europa League as runners-up of the 2013–14 Maltese FA Trophy, This was because the winners Valletta had qualified for the 2014–15 UEFA Champions League.)	0–2	1–3	1–3	0–0	—	0–1
6	Balzan	32	9	5	18	36	58	−22	18		1–3	1–3	4–4	2–4	0–4	—

Source: Malta Football Association: ,
Legend: Blue = home team win; Yellow = draw; Red = away team win.
Rules for classification: 1) Points; 2) Play-offs (only if needed to decide champions, teams for relegation or teams for UEFA competitions).
(C) Champions

=== Play-out ===
Pos	Team	Pld	W	D	L	GF	GA	GD	Pts	Relegation	FLO	TAR	QOR	NXX	VIT	RAB
7	Floriana	32	14	5	13	50	48	+2	30		—	0–3	3–2	1–1	1–2	2–1
8	Tarxien Rainbows	32	10	6	16	51	55	−4	28		0–2	—	4–0	0–1	1–1	7–1
9	Qormi	32	10	4	18	51	62	−11	26		2–1	2–4	—	5–1	5–1	3–1
10	Naxxar Lions	32	11	6	15	40	55	−15	26		0–2	1–2	0–1	—	3–3	2–0
11	Vittoriosa Stars (R)	32	9	6	17	41	66	−25	24	Relegation to the 2014–15 Maltese First Division	1–3	1–1	2–0	1–3	—	3–1
12	Rabat Ajax (R)	32	1	4	27	23	91	−68	4	Relegation to the 2014–15 Maltese First Division	0–5	0–2	0–3	1–1	1–2	—

Source: Malta Football Association: ,
Legend: Blue = home team win; Yellow = draw; Red = away team win.
Rules for classification: 1) Points; 2) Play-offs (only if needed to decide champions, teams for relegation or teams for UEFA competitions).
(R) Relegated

== Top goalscorer ==
Rank	Player	Team	Goals
1	(Brazil) Jhonnattann	Birkirkara	21
1	(Nigeria) Stanley Ohawuchi	Sliema Wanderers	21
1	(Brazil) Edison	Hibernians	21
4	(Nigeria) Alfred Effiong	Qormi	19
5	(Brazil) Denni	Valletta	18
6	(Colombia) Oscar Guerrero	Vittoriosa Stars	15
6	(Brazil) Marcelo Pereira	Vittoriosa Stars	15
6	(Nigeria) Obinna Obiefule	Hibernians	15
9	(Brazil) Igor Coronado	Floriana	14
9	(Nigeria) Haruna Shola Shodiya	Birkirkara	14
