= 2019–20 Valletta F.C. season =

Maltese football club season

Valletta
2019–20 season
- Manager: Darren Abdilla; Giovanni Tedesco
- Premier League: 2nd
- Champions League: Second Qualifying Round
- Europa League: Third Qualifying Round
- FA Trophy: Quarter-finals*
- BOV Super Cup: Winners
- Top goalscorer: League: Mario Fontanella (13); All: Mario Fontanella (17)

The 2019–20 season was a season cut short due to the COVID-19 pandemic, with Valletta finishing runners-up in the Maltese Premier League. The season was terminated with six games remaining, with the last league games having been played in March. This termination also included the FA Trophy, which had concluded at the quarter-final stage. Valletta qualified for the following season's Europa League first qualifying round by finishing second in the table. Valletta also won their thirteenth Super Cup and finished their current European campaign at the Europa League Third Qualifying Round stage.

== UEFA Champions League ==
=== First qualifying round ===
9 July 2019 1st leg	F91 Dudelange (Luxembourg)	2–2	Valletta (Malta)	Belair, Luxembourg
	Bettaieb 26'; Stolz 45+2'; Garos (yellow card) 63'; Delgado (yellow card) 66'	Report	Tulimieri (yellow card) 15'; S. Borg (yellow card) 46'; Packer 64'; R. Muscat (yellow card) 67' (yellow-red card) 89'; J. Borg 70'; Nwoko (yellow card) 73'; Pulis (yellow card) 90+3'	Stadium: Stade Josy Barthel; Attendance: 1,152; Referee: Arnold Hunter (Northern Ireland)

16 July 2019 2nd leg	Valletta (Malta)	1–1	F91 Dudelange (Luxembourg)	Ta' Qali, Malta
	S. Borg (yellow card) 28'; Fontanella 35', (yellow card) 74'; Pulis (yellow card) 50'; Peña (yellow card) 85'; Monticelli (yellow card) 87'; Bonello (yellow card) 89'; J. Zerafa (yellow card) 90+9'	Report	Da. Sinani (yellow card) 28'; Schnell (yellow card) 52'; Pokar 59'; Natami (yellow card) 90+9'; Cabral (yellow card) 90+9'	Stadium: Centenary Stadium; Attendance: 1,512; Referee: Juri Frischer (Estonia)

3–3 on aggregate; Valletta won on away goals.

=== Second qualifying round ===
24 July 2019 1st leg	Ferencváros (Hungary)	3–1	Valletta (Malta)	Budapest, Hungary
	Bonello 19' (o.g.); Lanzafame 36' (pen.), 59'	Report	J. Borg (yellow card) 15'; Pulis (yellow card) 35'; Tulimieri (yellow card) 38'; J. Zerafa (yellow card) 52'; Yuri 85'; S. Borg (red card) 90+4'	Stadium: Ferencváros Stadion; Attendance: 18,603; Referee: Radu Petrescu (Romania)

30 July 2019 2nd leg	Valletta (Malta)	1–1	Ferencváros (Hungary)	Ta' Qali, Malta
	Peña (yellow card) 22'; Fontanella 27' (pen.); R. Muscat (yellow card) 61'	Report	Ihnatenko (yellow card) 18'; Lanzafame (yellow card) 45+1'; Nguen 60'	Stadium: Centenary Stadium; Attendance: 1,108; Referee: Jonathan Lardot (Belgium)

Ferencváros won 4-2 on aggregate.

== UEFA Europa League ==
=== Third qualifying round ===
8 August 2019 1st leg	Astana (Kazakhstan)	5–1	Valletta (Malta)	Astana, Kazakhstan
	Sigurjónsson 8', 57'; Logvinenko 15', (yellow card) 82'; Tomasov 35'; Janga 80'	Report	Fontanella 67'	Stadium: Astana Arena; Attendance: 18,707; Referee: Vladislav Bezborodov (Russia)

15 August 2018 2nd leg	Valletta (Malta)	0–4	Astana (Kazakhstan)	Ta' Qali, Malta
	Peña (yellow card) 45'; Tulimieri (yellow card) 56'; Sala (yellow card) 58'	Report	Murtazayev 25', 68'; Tomasov 37', 89'	Stadium: National Stadium; Attendance: 595; Referee: Stephan Klossner (Switzerland)

Astana won 9–1 on aggregate.

== BOV Premier League ==
=== Results ===
Match	Date	Opponent	Venue	Result	Attendance	Scorers	Report
1	23 August 2019	Santa Lucia	Centenary Stadium	2–3	946	Fontanella 12', Nwoko 72'	Report
2	29 August 2019	Sliema W.	National Stadium	3–1	1,292	Peña 21', Piciollo 50', Yuri 90+2'	Report
3	15 September 2019	Floriana	National Stadium	1–1	3,737	Peña 90+4'	Report
4	21 September 2019	Balzan	National Stadium	2–0	1,509	Kaljević 27', Dzaria 86'	Report
5	28 September 2019	Birkirkara	National Stadium	2–2		S. Borg 10', Peña 58'	Report
6	3 October 2019	Gżira U.	National Stadium	1–3	1,142	Fontanella 69'	Report
7	20 October 2019	Gudja	Centenary Stadium	1–0		Fontanella 21'	Report
8	26 October 2019	Tarxien R.	Centenary Stadium	3–1		Nwoko 14', Fontanella 56', Packer 65'	Report
9	3 November 2019	Sirens	Hibs Ground	0–0			Report
10	8 November 2019	Senglea A.	Hibs Ground	1–0	567	Piciollo 28'	Report
11	24 November 2019	Mosta	National Stadium	4–0		Dzaria 24', Fontanella (2) 35', 54' (pen), Tulimieri 85'	Report
12	8 December 2019	Hibernians	National Stadium	1–1	2,238	Fontanella 42'	Report
13	15 December 2019	Ħamrun S.	National Stadium	1–0	2,018	Fontanella 45'	Report
14	11 January 2020	Santa Lucia	Centenary Stadium	2–2		Kaljević 51', Fontanella 87' (pen)	Report
15	20 January 2020	Sliema W.	National Stadium	2–1	642	Muscat 61', Fontanella 85'	Report
16	2 February 2020	Floriana	National Stadium	1–0		S. Borg 6'	Report
17	8 February 2020	Balzan	National Stadium	3–1		Fontanella (3) 32' (pen), 81' (pen), 90'	Report
18	16 February 2020	Birkirkara	National Stadium	1–4	2,830	Alba 1'	Report
19	21 February 2020	Gżira U.	National Stadium	1–0	1,359	S. Borg 79'	Report
20	7 March 2020	Gudja	Centenary Stadium	0–2			Report
21	13 March 2020	Tarxien R.	National Stadium	–	–	–	
22	19 March 2020	Sirens	Hibs Ground	–	–	–	
23	5 April 2020	Senglea A.	National Stadium	–	–	–	
24	13 April 2020	Mosta	National Stadium	–	–	–	
25	19 April 2020	Hibernians	National Stadium	–	–	–	
26	–	Ħamrun S.	–	–	–	–	

== League table ==
Pos	Team	Pld	W	D	L	GF	GA	GD	Pts	Qualification or relegation
1	Floriana (C)	20	12	5	3	38	15	+23	41	Qualification for the Champions League first qualifying round
2	Valletta	20	11	5	4	32	22	+10	38	Qualification for the Europa League first qualifying round
3	Hibernians	20	11	4	5	34	20	+14	37	Qualification for the Europa League first qualifying round
4	Sirens	20	10	5	5	30	26	+4	35	Qualification for the Europa League first qualifying round
5	Birkirkara	20	9	6	5	30	20	+10	33	
6	Gżira United	20	9	5	6	35	19	+16	32	
7	Balzan	20	8	4	8	33	29	+4	28	
8	Mosta	20	9	1	10	29	35	−6	28	
9	Ħamrun Spartans	20	6	7	7	24	25	−1	25	
10	Sliema Wanderers	20	7	3	10	24	22	+2	24	
11	Gudja United	20	6	6	8	24	30	−6	24	
12	St. Lucia	20	6	5	9	24	33	−9	23	
13	Senglea Athletic (Note: Senglea Athletic and Tarxien Rainbows kept their place in the top-flight as relegations were scrapped for the league season.)	20	3	7	10	21	39	−18	16	~~Relegation to the 2020–21 Maltese Challenge League~~
14	Tarxien Rainbows	20	1	1	18	18	61	−43	4	~~Relegation to the 2020–21 Maltese Challenge League~~

Source: Malta Football Association
Rules for classification: 1) Points; 2) Play-offs (only if needed to decide champions, teams for relegation or teams for UEFA competitions).
(C) Champions

== The FA Trophy ==
Round	Date	Opponent	Venue	Result	Attendance	Scorers	Report
R3	30 November 2019	St. Andrews	Centenary Stadium	4–0		J. Borg 18', Packer 26', S. Borg (2) 30', 35'	Report
R4	26 January 2020	Sirens	Centenary Stadium	4–1	906	Kaljević (2) 7', 79', Piciollo 27', Barrios 90+3'	Report
Quarter-final	29 February 2020	Gudja	Hibs Ground	2–0	905	Kaljević (2) 52', 58'	Report
Semi-final	–	–	–	–	–	–	

== BOV Super Cup ==
21 December 2019	Valletta (Malta)	2–1	Balzan (Malta)	National Stadium
	Fontanella 48'; Nwoko 60'	Report	Ljubomirac 34'; Correa (yellow card) 45+1'	Attendance: 1,268; Referee: Philip Farrugia (Malta)

== Squad statistics ==
=== First Team ===
No.	Pos.	Name	BOV Premier League		UEFA Champions League		UEFA Europa League		The FA Trophy		BOV Super Cup		Total		Discipline	
No.	Pos.	Name	Apps	Goals	Apps	Goals	Apps	Goals	Apps	Goals	Apps	Goals	Apps	Goals	Yellow card	Red card
1	GK	(Malta) Henry Bonello	19	0	4	0	1	0	0	0	1	0	25	0	4	0
2	DF	(Malta) Jonathan Caruana	8	0	0	0	0	0	0	0	0	0	8	0	0	0
4	DF	(Malta) Steve Borg	18	3	3	0	0	0	2(1)	2	1	0	24(1)	5	9	2
5	DF	(Malta) Ryan Camilleri	11(2)	0	2	0	2	0	3	0	1	0	19(2)	0	2	0
6	MF	(Italy) Antonio Monticelli	0	0	0(3)	0	0	0	0	0	0	0	0(3)	0	1	0
8	FW	(Argentina) Santiago Malano	3(2)	0	1	0	0	0	1(1)	0	0	0	5(3)	0	0	0
9	FW	(Montenegro) Bojan Kaljević	9(5)	2	0	0	0	0	2	4	0(1)	0	11(6)	6	4	0
10	FW	(Italy) Matteo Piciollo	12(6)	2	1(1)	0	1(1)	0	2	1	1	0	17(8)	3	2	0
11	MF	(Malta) Shaun Dimech	8(7)	0	1(3)	0	0(2)	0	3	0	0(1)	0	12(13)	0	0	0
14	FW	(Malta) Kyrian Nwoko	7(5)	2	3(1)	0	1	0	1	0	1	1	13(6)	3	1	0
15	DF	(Argentina) Juan Cruz Gill	0	0	0(1)	0	0	0	0	0	0	0	0(1)	0	0	0
16	DF	(Malta) Jean Borg	17	0	4	1	2	0	3	1	1	0	27	2	5	0
17	DF	(Albania) Eslit Sala	0	0	0	0	0(1)	0	0(1)	0	0	0	0(2)	0	1	0
17	FW	(Colombia) Jhony Moises Barrios	0(2)	0	0	0	0	0	0(1)	1	0	0	0(3)	1	0	0
18	DF	(Dominican Republic) Enmy Peña	20	3	4	0	2	0	2	0	1	0	29	3	7	1
19	DF	(Malta) Joseph Zerafa	11(2)	0	4	0	2	0	2	0	1	0	20(2)	0	7	0
19	DF	(Malta) Samuel Vella	0	0	0	0	0	0	0	0	0	0	0	0	0	0
21	MF	(Brazil) Douglas Packer	7(1)	1	3	1	2	0	1	1	0	0	13(1)	3	0	0
22	MF	(Malta) Nicholas Pulis	2(10)	0	2(1)	0	0(2)	0	2(1)	0	1	0	7(14)	0	5	0
24	MF	(Malta) Rowen Muscat	17	1	3	0	2	0	0	0	1	0	23	1	6	1
27	FW	(Argentina) Miguel Alba	4(3)	1	0	0	0	0	1(1)	0	0	0	5(4)	1	2	0
31	MF	(Malta) Kenley Scerri	0	0	0	0	0	0	0	0	0	0	0	0	0	0
32	FW	(Malta) Ryan Tonna	0(1)	0	0	0	0	0	0(1)	0	0	0	0(2)	0	0	0
33	MF	(Malta) Jeremy Micallef	0	0	0	0	0	0	0(1)	0	0	0	0(1)	0	0	0
37	GK	(Malta) Anson Saliba	0	0	0	0	0	0	0	0	0	0	0	0	0	0
37	GK	(Malta) Reeves Cini	0	0	0	0	0	0	0	0	0	0	0	0	0	0
41	GK	(Malta) Yenz Cini	1(1)	0	0	0	1	0	3	0	0	0	5(1)	0	1	0
77	MF	(Malta) Triston Caruana	5	0	0	0	0	0	2	0	0	0	7	0	0	0
88	MF	(Georgia (country)) Irakli Dzaria	10	2	0	0	0	0	0	0	0	0	10	2	3	0
89	FW	(Italy) Mario Fontanella	20	13	4	2	2	1	2	0	1	1	29	17	4	0
91	FW	(Brazil) Yuri Messias	5(1)	1	1(1)	1	2	0	0	0	0	0	8(2)	2	1	0
92	MF	(Italy) Kevin Tulimieri	6(7)	1	4	0	2	0	1(1)	0	0(1)	0	13(9)	1	7	0
97	FW	(France) David Faupala	0(1)	0	0	0	0	0	0	0	0	0	0(1)	0	0	0

== Transfers ==
=== In ===
Date	Pos.	Name	From	Fee	Ref.
1 July 2019	MF	(Italy) Kevin Tulimieri	(Malta) Ħamrun Spartans	Free	
2 July 2019	MF	(Brazil) Douglas Packer	(Brazil) Remo	Free	
23 July 2019	FW	(Brazil) Yuri Messias	(Saudi Arabia) Al-Jabalain	Free	
31 August 2019	MF	(Georgia (country)) Irakli Dzaria	(Albania) FK Kukësi	Free	
20 December 2019	MF	(Malta) Triston Caruana	(Malta) Ħamrun Spartans	Free	
31 December 2019	FW	(Argentina) Miguel Alba	(Malta) Birkirkara	Free	
17 January 2020	FW	(Colombia) Jhony Moises Barrios	(Colombia) Real Cartagena	Free	
8 February 2020	FW	(France) David Faupala	(Norway) FK Jerv	Free	

=== Out ===
Date	Pos.	Name	To	Fee	Ref.
26 June 2019	DF	(Argentina) Miguel Alba	(Malta) Birkirkara	Free	
30 June 2019	MF	(Oman) Raed Ibrahim Saleh	Unattached	Released	
1 July 2019	GK	(Malta) Nicky Vella	(Malta) Birkirkara	Free	
4 July 2019	DF	(Malta) Brandon Grech	(Malta) Qormi	Free	
16 August 2019	DF	(Argentina) Juan Cruz Gill	(Malta) Sliema Wanderers	Free	
28 August 2019	FW	(Malta) Russell Fenech	(Malta) Sirens	Free	
6 January 2020	MF	(Brazil) Douglas Packer	(Brazil) Remo	Free	
15 January 2020	MF	(Italy) Antonio Monticelli	(Malta) Marsa	Free	
27 February 2020	FW	(Brazil) Yuri Messias	(Brazil) Frederiquense	Free	
31 May 2020	FW	(Colombia) Jhony Moises Barrios	Unattached	Released	
31 May 2020	FW	(France) David Faupala	Unattached	Released	

=== Loan in ===
Date from	Date to	Pos.	Name	To	Ref.
11 December 2019	31 May 2020	GK	(Malta) Reeves Cini	(Malta) Pietà Hotspurs	

=== Loan out ===
Date from	Date to	Pos.	Name	To	Ref.
26 June 2019	31 May 2020	MF	(Malta) Jurgen Suda	(Malta) Żejtun Corinthians	
30 June 2019	31 May 2020	DF	(Malta) Dario Tabone	(Malta) Vittoriosa Stars	
1 July 2019	31 May 2020	DF	(Malta) Miguel Attard	(Malta) Gudja United	
1 July 2019	31 May 2020	FW	(Malta) Terence Scerri	(Malta) Marsa	
1 August 2019	31 May 2020	DF	(Malta) Clivert Sciberras	(Malta) Mqabba	
1 August 2019	31 May 2020	DF	(Malta) Miguel Ghigo	(Malta) Mqabba	
1 August 2019	31 May 2020	FW	(Malta) Orson Mackay	(Malta) Marsa	
14 August 2019	31 May 2020	GK	(Malta) Maverick Buhagiar	(Malta) Tarxien Rainbows	
21 August 2019	31 May 2020	GK	(Malta) Andre Spiteri	(Malta) Mosta	
1 October 2019	31 May 2020	MF	(Malta) Cleavon Frendo	(Malta) Mtarfa	
29 January 2020	31 May 2020	DF	(Albania) Eslit Sala	(Malta) Mqabba	
29 January 2020	31 May 2020	DF	(Malta) Jeremy Azzopardi	(Malta) Mqabba	
