= 2015 Maltese Super Cup =

Hibernians	Birkirkara
2	1
- Date: 12 August 2015
- Venue: Ta' Qali National Stadium, Ta' Qali, Malta
- Referee: Marco Borg
- Attendance: 4,038

The 2015 Maltese Super Cup was the 31st Maltese Super Cup, an annual football match played between the winners of the previous season's Maltese Premier League and the FA Trophy. The match was contested by Hibernians, champions of the 2014–15 Maltese Premier League, and Birkirkara, winners of the 2014–15 FA Trophy against the same Hibernians. Played as the first official game of the season at Ta' Qali National Stadium on 12 August 2015, Hibernians came from behind to win 2–1, making it their third title in eleven appearances.

== Match ==
=== Details ===
12 August 2015
20:00 CET

Hibernians	2–1	Birkirkara
Muscat 31' (o.g.); Mazzetti 42' (o.g.)	Report	Miccoli 12'

Ta' Qali National Stadium, Ta' Qali
Attendance: 4,038
Referee: Marco Borg

GK	12	(Malta) Jurgen Borg
DF	5	(Malta) Andrei Agius
DF	20	(Equatorial Guinea) Rui
DF	8	(Malta) Rodolfo Soares
DF	13	(Malta) Clayton Failla	(yellow card) 27'
MF	10	(Malta) Andrew Cohen	(yellow card) 47'	(substituted off) 78'
MF	31	(Brazil) Gilmar	(yellow card) 71'	(substituted off) 90'
MF	7	(Brazil) Jackson Lima
MF	11	(Malta) Bjorn Kristensen
FW	9	(Brazil) Marcelo Dias	(substituted off) 77'
FW	23	(Brazil) Jorginho
Substitutes:
GK		(Malta) Rudy Briffa
DF	6	(Malta) Jonathan Pearson	(substituted on) 90'
MF		(Malta) Dunstan Vella
MF	19	(Malta) Johann Bezzina	(substituted on) 78'
MF	14	(Malta) Jurgen Degabriele
FW	22	(Malta) Joseph Mbong
FW		(Brazil) Jorge Silva	(substituted on) 77'
Manager:
(Serbia) Branko Nisevic

GK	16	(Malta) Justin Haber
DF	5	(Italy) Mauricio Mazzetti	(yellow card) 34'
DF		(Malta) Zach Muscat	(substituted off) 90'
DF	15	(Serbia) Nikola Vukanac	(yellow card) 75'
DF	19	(Malta) Joseph Zerafa	(yellow card) 85'
MF	7	(Malta) Ryan Camenzuli	(substituted off) 64'
MF	2	(Brazil) Marcelina Emerson
MF	24	(Malta) Rowen Muscat	(substituted off) 76'
MF	6	(Malta) Paul Fenech
FW	10	(Italy) Fabrizio Miccoli
FW	11	(Slovenia) Vito Plut
Substitutes:
GK	12	(Malta) Ini Etim Akpan
MF		(Malta) Cain Attard
MF	4	(Malta) Gareth Sciberras
MF	8	(Malta) Edmond Agius
MF	25	(Italy) Edin Murga	(substituted on) 64'
MF	13	(Spain) Juan Quero	(substituted on) 76'
FW		(Malta) Terence Vella	(substituted on) 90'
Manager:
(Italy) Giovanni Tedesco

Assistant referees:
Edward Spiteri
Sammy Attard
Fourth official:
Fyodor Zammit

== See also ==
- 2015–16 Maltese Premier League
- 2015–16 Maltese FA Trophy
