= 2019 Maltese Super Cup =

Valletta	Balzan
2	1
- Date: 21 December 2019
- Venue: Ta' Qali National Stadium, Ta' Qali, Malta
- Referee: Philip Farrugia

The 2019 Maltese Super Cup was the 35th Maltese Super Cup, an annual football match played between the title holders of the Maltese Premier League and the Maltese FA Trophy. It was contested on 21 December 2019 by Valletta – who won league, after defeating Hibernians in the decider and Balzan who won FA Trophy the previous season. Played at the Ta' Qali National Stadium, Valletta won the match 2–1.

== Match ==
=== Details ===
21 December 2019
18:00 CET

Valletta	2–1	Balzan
Fontanella 48'; Nwoko 60'	Report	Ljubomirac 34'

Ta' Qali National Stadium, Ta' Qali
Referee: Philip Farrugia

Valletta	Balzan

GK	1	(Malta) Henry Bonello
RB	5	(Malta) Ryan Camilleri
RCB	19	(Malta) Joseph Zerafa
CB	24	(Malta) Steve Borg
LCB	22	(Malta) Nicholas Pulis
LB	16	(Malta) Jean Borg
CM	18	(Dominican Republic) Enmy Peña
CM	4	(Malta) Rowen Muscat
CM	14	(Malta) Kyrian Nwoko	60'	(substituted off) 89'
FW	10	(Italy) Matteo Piciollo		(substituted off) 82'
FW	89	(Italy) Mario Fontanella	48'	(substituted off) 92'
Substitutes:
GK	41	(Malta) Yenz Cini
DF	17	(Albania) Elset Sala
MF	92	(Italy) Kevin Tulimieri		(substituted on) 92'
MF	11	(Malta) Shaun Dimech		(substituted on) 82'
MF	32	(Malta) Ryan Tonna
FW	8	(Argentina) Santiago Malano
FW	86	(Montenegro) Bojan Kaljević		(substituted on) 89'
Manager:
(Portugal) Cardoso Mendes

GK	83	(North Macedonia) Kristijan Naumovski
RB	20	(Serbia) Ivan Božović
CB	3	(Netherlands) Augustine Loof
CB	5	(Bosnia and Herzegovina) Aleksandar Kosorić
CB	18	(Serbia) Uroš Ljubomirac	34'
LB	11	(Malta) Steve Bezzina		(substituted off) 73'
CM	16	(Malta) Paul Fenech
CM	30	(Brazil) Ricardo Corrêa	(yellow card) 45'
CM	10	(Malta) Steve Pisani
FW	17	(Malta) Alfred Effiong
FW	50	(Serbia) Andrija Majdevac
Substitutes:
GK	1	(Malta) Sean Mintoff
DF	14	(Malta) Zak Grech
DF	15	(Malta) Michael Johnson
DF	85	(Malta) Kyle Sciberras
MF	6	(Malta) Dale Camilleri
MF	20	(Malta) Jake Pisani
FW	9	(Malta) Luke Montebello		(substituted on) 73'
Manager:
(England) Mark Miller

Assistant referees:
Sultana Duncan
Vela Roberto
Fourth official:
Farrugia Cann Trustin
