= 2022–23 Maltese FA Trophy =

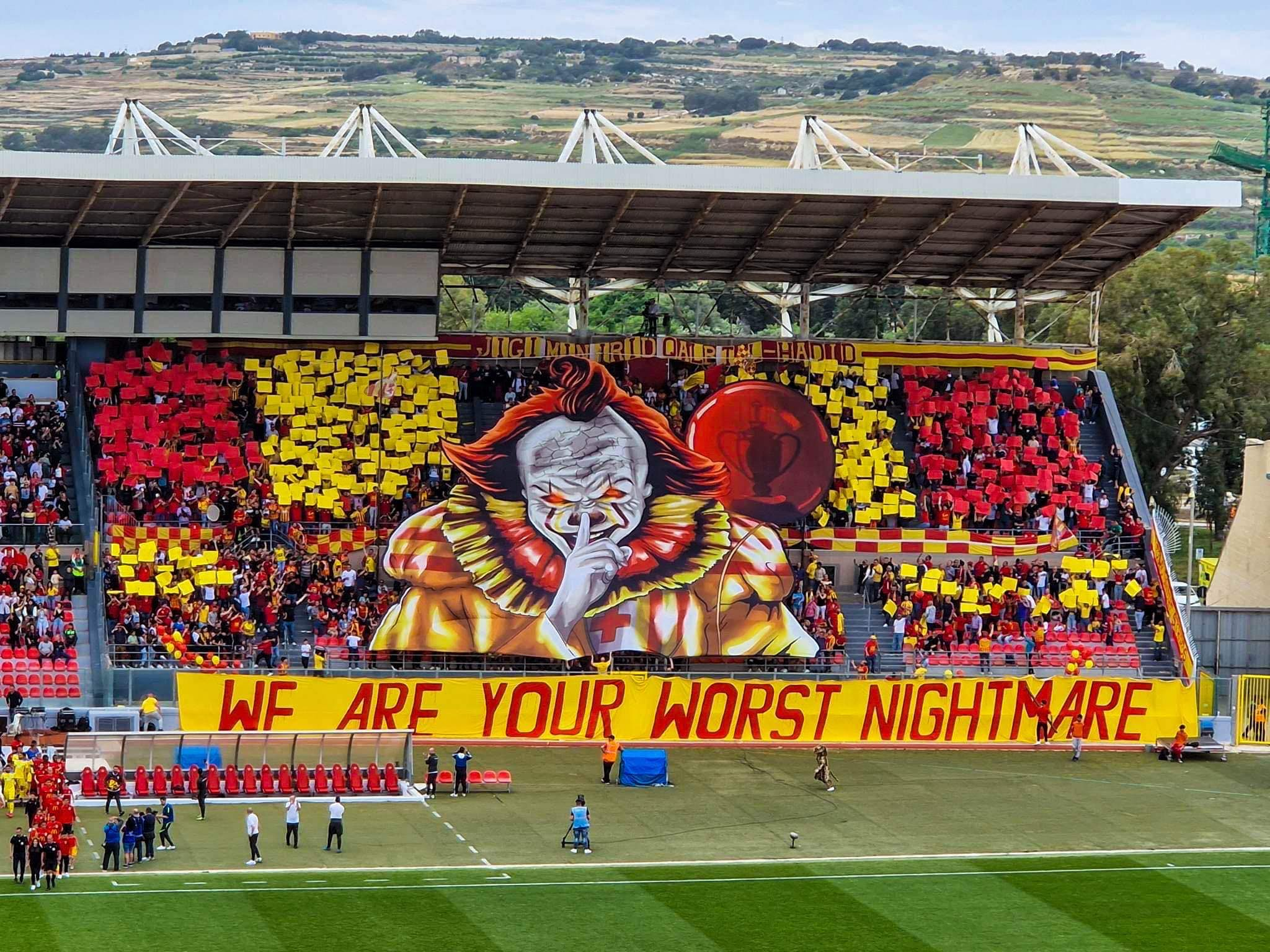
- Birkirkara Fans Before Maltese FA Trophy Final 2023

Tournament details
- Country: Malta
- Dates: 15 November 2022 - 30 April 2023

Final positions
- Champions: Birkirkara (6th title)
- Runners-up: Marsaxlokk

Tournament statistics
- Matches played: 42
- Goals scored: 153 (3.64 per match)
- Top goal scorer: Pablo Vinicius De Moraes Ferreira (5 Goals)
- All statistics correct as of 30 May 2023.

The 2022–23 Maltese FA Trophy, officially named IZIBET FA Trophy due to sponsorship reasons, is the 85th edition of the football cup competition, the FA Trophy. The winners of the Maltese FA Trophy will earn a place in the first qualifying round of the 2023–24 UEFA Europa Conference League. The first round of games started on 15 November 2022.

Floriana were the defending champions. But were eliminated in the Round of 32 by Santa Lucia.

== Preliminary round ==
Twelve preliminary round matches played on 15–22 November 2022. The draw for the preliminary round was held on 26 October 2022.

15 November 2022	Mqabba (2)	3–2	Victoria Hotspurs (Gozo) (1)	Ta' Qali
20:00 CEST	Petar Kanzurov 17'; Jacques Vella Critien 28'; Arsene Rye Cilia Mumford 69'		Adrian Xiberras 32'; Lucas Mancuso Lemos Santos Ferreira 84'	Stadium: Centenary Stadium; Referee: Slawomir Olucha

15 November 2022	Marsa (2)	2–3	Melita (2)	Ħamrun
21:00 CEST	Lucas Ribeiro De Oliveira 39' (pen.), 43'		Mattia Comes 42'; Thomas Griscti 90'; Hiroya Konno 90+4'	Stadium: Victor Tedesco Stadium; Referee: Emanuel Grech

16 November 2022	Naxxar Lions (2)	5–1	Oratory Youths (Gozo) (1)	Ta' Qali
18:30 CEST	Neil Pace Cocks 17'; Robinson Blandon Rendon 30', 72'; Antonio Xuereb 82' (o.g.); Sven Fabri 87'		Haraan Hajazan Goncalves Barbosa 55'	Stadium: Centenary Stadium; Referee: Daniel Portelli

16 November 2022	Attard (2)	3–2	Birżebbuġa St. Peter's (3)	St. Paul's Bay
20:30 CEST	Glending Farrugia 20'; Lydon Cuschieri 49' (pen.), 53'		Touray Ousman 21'; Yessous Camilleri 87'	Stadium: Sirens Stadium; Referee: Stefan Pace

16 November 2022	St. Andrews (2)	0–4	Żabbar St. Patrick (3)	Ta' Qali
21:00 CEST			David Oliveira Souza 19', 32'; Nick Borg 26'; Kenneth Aquilina 69'	Stadium: Centenary Stadium; Referee: Glen Tonna

16 November 2022	Kalkara (3)	0–2 (a.e.t.)	Tarxien Rainbows (2)	Ħamrun
21:00 CEST			Thiago Nonato Peixoto 106'; Emmanuel Mbong 112'	Stadium: Victor Tedesco Stadium; Referee: Jo-Anna Vassallo

17 November 2022	Swieqi United (2)	3–0	Fgura United (2)	Ħamrun
21:00 CEST	David Emmanuel Garba 9'; Anthony Bartolo 12'; Miguel Tabone 36' (o.g.)			Stadium: Victor Tedesco Stadium; Referee: Andrea Sciriha

19 November 2022	Nadur Youngsters (Gozo) (1)	7–1	Vittoriosa Stars (2)	Kerċem
13:00 CEST	Igor Nedeljkovic 2', 7', 44'; Gustavo Dourado Ferreira 14', 34', 53'; Predrag Dordevic 36'		Rodrigues Mauricio Osmar Britto 84' (pen.)	Stadium: Kerċem Ajax Stadium; Referee: Daniel Portelli

19 November 2022	Xewkija Tigers (Gozo) (1)	2–0	Lija Athletic (2)	Kerċem
15:30 CEST	Damir Andelovic 12' (pen.), 82' (pen.)			Stadium: Kerċem Ajax Stadium; Referee: Matthew De Gabriele

20 November 2022	Kercem Ajax (Gozo) (1)	3–2	Marsaskala (2)	Kerċem
12:15 CEST	Bruno Da Cruz 2'; Pablo Vinicius De Moraes Ferreira 7' (pen.), 28'		Michael Gatt 55'; Adrian Carabott 66'	Stadium: Kerċem Ajax Stadium; Referee: Alex Johnson

20 November 2022	Ghajnsielem (Gozo) (1)	5–0	Qrendi (2)	Kerċem
14:45 CEST	Claudio Henrique Da Silva Barbosa 16', 21', 28'; Daniel Farrugia 19'; Patrick Dos Santos Cruz 32'			Stadium: Kerċem Ajax Stadium; Referee: Fyodor Zammit

22 November 2022	Sannat Lions (Gozo) (1)	1–3 (a.e.t.)	Qala Saints (Gozo) (1)	Kerċem
18:00 CEST	Camilo Andres Sanchez Gonzales 37'		Aaron Azzopard 90' (o.g.); Rafael Conrado Prudente 107', 115'	Stadium: Kerċem Ajax Stadium; Referee: Jason Portelli

== Round of 32 ==
Sixteen Matches were played on 13–15 January. The draw for the Round of 32 and Round of 16 was held on 4 January 2023. The draws were held by Malta FA Director of Football Operations Stephen Azzopardi together with former Malta national team player Michael Mifsud and Franco Degabriele Chief Commercial Officer of IZIBET. The Round of 32 featured all 14 clubs across the Premier League, who entered the competition in this round.

13 January 2023	Hibernians (1)	3–1	Żurrieq (2)	Ta' Qali
18:00 CEST	Gabriel Mensah 29'; Bjorn Kristensen 38'; Yunusa Muritala 55'		Robinho 44'	Stadium: Centenary Stadium; Referee: Andrea Sciriha

13 January 2023	Sirens (1)	1–0	Mqabba (2)	Ta' Qali
21:00 CEST	Kei Sano 87'			Stadium: Centenary Stadium; Referee: Slawomir Olucha

14 January 2023	Birkirkara (1)	4–0	Nadur Youngsters (Gozo) (1)	Ta' Qali
14:00 CEST	Osvaldo Iorio 11'; Yannick Yankam 41'; Alex Da Paixao Alves 51'; Kevin Tulimieri 67'			Stadium: Centenary Stadium; Referee: Trustin Farrugia Cann

14 January 2023	Attard (2)	2–8	Kerċem Ajax (Gozo) (1)	Ħamrun
14:00 CEST	Bledi Alla 38'; Lydon Cuschieri 66'		Pablo Vinicius De Moraes Ferreira 6', 7', 84'; Bruno Da Cruz 13', 47'; Andrew Mizzi 15'; Ognjen Rolovic 69'; Karl Formosa 82'	Stadium: Victor Tedesco Stadium; Referee: Andrea Naudi

14 January 2023	Balzan (1)	4–0	Tarxien Rainbows (2)	Ta' Qali
17:00 CEST	Bogdan Mladenovic 16'; Paul Fenech 20'; Matheus Nogureira Albuguerque de Sousa 49', 60'			Stadium: Centenary Stadium; Referee: Daniel Portelli

14 January 2023	Mtarfa (2)	1–2	Qala Saints (Gozo) (1)	Ħamrun
17:00 CEST	Joseph Jojo Ogunnupe 69'		Nathan Chukwudi Njoku 65'; Ayesller Carvalho 87'	Stadium: Victor Tedesco Stadium; Referee: Etienne Mangion

14 January 2023	Żejtun Corinthians (2)	0–5	Marsaxlokk (1)	Ta' Qali
20:00 CEST			Tiago Adan Fonseca 1'; Santiago Adrian Ferraris 7'; Santiago Fabian Moracc 54'; Kristian Keqi 59'; Wellignton Valentim De Sousa 83'	Stadium: Centenary Stadium; Referee: Fyodor Zammit

15 January 2023	Valletta (1)	5–1	Żabbar St. Patrick (3)	Ta' Qali
11:00 CEST	Kilian Bevis 19'; Federico Falcone 59'; Shaun Dimech 46'; Andrea Zammit 58', 67'		David Oliveira Souza 5'	Stadium: Centenary Stadium; Referee: Emanuel Grech

15 January 2023	Gudja United (1)	2–1	Naxxar Lions (2)	Ta' Qali
14:00 CEST	Roberto Matías Muchardi 35'; Vito Plut 50' (pen.)		Robinson Blandón Rendón 28'	Stadium: Centenary Stadium; Referee: Malcolm Spiteri

15 January 2023	Gzira United (1)	2–0	Sliema Wanderers (2)	Paola
14:00 CEST	Jefferson Mateus de Assis Estácio 6'; Gabriel Bohrer 63' (pen.)			Stadium: Tony Bezzina Stadium; Referee: Matthew De Gabriele

15 January 2023	Pietà Hotspurs (1)	2–0	Xewkija Tigers (Gozo) (1)	Ħamrun
14:00 CEST	Kian Leonardi 41'; Yuto Morita 61'			Stadium: Victor Tedesco Stadium; Referee: Ezekiel Barbara

15 January 2023	Ħamrun Spartans (1)	3–1 (a.e.t.)	Għajnsielem (Gozo) (1)	Xewkija
15:00 CEST	Elvis Mashike Sukisa 90', 115'; Dodo 104'		Patrick Cruz 46' (pen.)	Stadium: Gozo Stadium; Referee: Ishmael Barbara

15 January 2023	Melita (2)	0–3	Mosta (1)	Ta' Qali
17:00 CEST			Tyrone Farrugia 35'; Chidera Michael Okoh 45+1'; Boubakary Diarra 71'	Stadium: Centenary Stadium; Referee: Daniel Casha

15 January 2023	Floriana (1)	0–1	Santa Lucia (1)	Paola
17:00 CEST			Robert Hehedosh 7'	Stadium: Tony Bezzina Stadium; Referee: Alex Johnson

15 January 2023	San Ġwann (2)	3–1	Mġarr United (3)	Ħamrun
17:00 CEST	Daniel Sowatey 8', 62'; Tobi Akiti 21'		Christian Saint Ebisindor 30'	Stadium: Victor Tedesco Stadium; Referee: Jo-Anna Vassallo

15 January 2023	Swieqi United (2)	1–0	Żebbuġ Rangers (1)	Ta' Qali
20:00 CEST	Jean Borg 85'			Stadium: Centenary Stadium; Referee: Stefan Pace

== Round of 16 ==
Eight Matches were played on 7, 8, and 15 February. The draw for the Round of 32 and Round of 16 was held on 4 January 2023. The draws were held by Malta FA Director of Football Operations Stephen Azzopardi together with former Malta national team player Michael Mifsud and Franco Degabriele Chief Commercial Officer of IZIBET. The round includes at least two teams from the Maltese Challenge League San Ġwann and Swieqi United, and two clubs representing from Gozo Football League are Kerċem Ajax and Qala Saints. On 8 and 9 February the Malta Football Association Postponed six matches because of bad weather in Malta, and they played on 15 February.

7 February 2023	Mosta (1)	1–1 (a.e.t.) (3–2 p)	Swieqi United (2)	Ta' Qali
18:00 CEST	Chidera Micheal Okoh 5'		Jean Borg 60'	Stadium: Centenary Stadium; Referee: Emanuel Grech

8 February 2023	Pietà Hotspurs (1)	0–2	San Ġwann (2)	Ħamrun
19:30 CEST			Gonzalo Nicolas Virano 62'; Tobi Akiti 82'	Stadium: Victor Tedesco Stadium; Referee: Slobodan Petrovic

15 February 2023	Balzan (1)	2–2 (a.e.t.) (4–5 p)	Birkirkara (1)	Ta' Qali
17:00 CEST	Angel Yesid Torres Quinones 62'; Momcilo Raso 77' (pen.)		Yannick Yankam 14'; Cain Attard 90+5'	Stadium: Ta' Qali National Stadium; Referee: Matthew De Gabriele
	Penalties
	Bogdan Mladenovic (penalty scored); Diver Duvan Torres Quinones (penalty scored); Delvin Chanel Ndinga (penalty missed); Matheus Nogureira Albuguerque de Sousa (penalty scored); Alexander Satariano (penalty scored); Momčilo Rašo (penalty missed)		(penalty missed) Yannick Yankam; (penalty scored) Enzo Daniel Cabrera; (penalty scored) Andrei Ciolacu; (penalty scored) Kevin Tulimieri; (penalty scored) Simon Zibo; (penalty scored) Kurt Zammit
Note: The match was originally scheduled to be played on 8 February, but was postponed due to bad weather in Malta.

15 February 2023	Hibernians (1)	8–0	Kerċem Ajax (Gozo) (1)	Paola
18:00 CEST	Jake Grech 11', 74'; Jurgen Degabriele 15'; Ali Diakite 23'; Thaylor Aldama 42'; Yunusa Owolabi Muritala 54'; Dunstan Vella 68'; Jairo Morillas Rivero 80'			Stadium: Tony Bezzina Stadium; Referee: Daniel Casha
Note: The match was originally scheduled to be played on 8 February, but was postponed due to bad weather in Malta.

15 February 2023	Gzira United (1)	3–0	Qala Saints (Gozo) (1)	Ta' Qali
18:00 CEST	Brooklyn Borg 37'; Lucas Ribeiro De Oliveira 45+1'; Gabriel Bohrer 75' (pen.)			Stadium: Centenary Stadium; Referee: Slawomir Olucha
Note: The match was originally scheduled to be played on 9 February, but was postponed due to bad weather in Malta.

15 February 2023	Valletta (1)	1–2	Ħamrun Spartans (1)	Ta' Qali
20:20 CEST	Federico Falcone 7'		Elvis Mashike Sukisa 60'; Matthew Guillaumier 72' (pen.)	Stadium: Ta' Qali National Stadium; Referee: Trustin Farrugia Cann
Note: The match was originally scheduled to be played on 8 February, but was postponed due to bad weather in Malta. The match, originally scheduled for 19:30 local time, was delayed 50 minutes to prevent overlap with the match between Balzan and Birkirkara, which had end the match by Penalty shootout.

15 February 2023	Santa Lucia (1)	0–2	Marsaxlokk (1)	Paola
20:30 CEST			Santiago Fabian Moracci 62', 90+5'	Stadium: Tony Bezzina Stadium; Referee: Glen Tonna
Note: The match was originally scheduled to be played on 9 February, but was postponed due to bad weather in Malta.

15 February 2023	Gudja United (1)	1–0	Sirens (1)	Ta' Qali
20:30 CEST	Tatsuro Nagamatsu 70'			Stadium: Centenary Stadium; Referee: Darryl Agius
Note: The match was originally scheduled to be played on 8 February, but was postponed due to bad weather in Malta.

== Quarter-finals ==
The matches were played on 25 and 26 February 2023. The draw for the Quarter-final was held on 17 February 2023. The draws were held by former Malta international defender Brian Said and Franco Degabriele from Izibet in the presence of Malta FA Director Football Operations Stephen Azzopardi. The round includes one team from the second tier, the lowest-ranked team remaining in the competition: San Ġwann.

25 February 2023	Gzira United (1)	1–1 (a.e.t.) (4–3 p)	Gudja United (1)	Ta' Qali
14:00 CEST	Nikolai Muscat 90+4'		Vito Plut 24'	Stadium: Centenary Stadium; Referee: Slobodan Petrovic
	Penalties
	Maxuell Maia (penalty missed); Marko Cosic (penalty scored); Gabriel Bohrer (penalty scored); Jefferson De Assis (penalty scored); Nikolai Muscat (penalty scored)		(penalty missed) Hubert Vella; (penalty scored) Kolf Divaio Irisio; (penalty scored) Andre Prates; (penalty scored) Roberto Matias Muchardi; (penalty missed) James Arthur

25 February 2023	Birkirkara (1)	1–0	Ħamrun Spartans (1)	Ta' Qali
16:00 CEST	Enzo Daniel Cabrera 17'			Stadium: Ta' Qali National Stadium; Referee: Ishmael Barbara

26 February 2023	Mosta (1)	5–0	San Ġwann (2)	Ta' Qali
14:00 CEST	Chidera Micheal Okoh 27'; Ferebory Dore 33', 57'; Steve Kingue 38'; Christ Ememe 80'			Stadium: Centenary Stadium; Referee: Darryl Agius

26 February 2023	Hibernians (1)	0–1	Marsaxlokk (1)	Ta' Qali
16:00 CEST			Leandro Aguirre 63'	Stadium: Ta' Qali National Stadium; Referee: Andrea Sciriha

== Semi-finals ==
The matches were played on 25 and 26 April 2023. The draw for the Semi-final was held on 15 April 2023. In the Semi-finals, there are 4 clubs left. All from Maltese Premier League.

25 April 2023	Marsaxlokk (1)	1–1 (a.e.t.) (5–4 p)	Gzira United (1)	Ta' Qali
19:00 CEST	Leandro Aguirre 28' (pen.)		Jefferson De Assis 15'	Stadium: Ta' Qali National Stadium; Referee: Malcolm Spiteri
	Penalties
	Leandro Aguirre (penalty scored); Kristian Keqi (penalty scored); Santiago Adrian Ferraris (penalty scored); Juan Cruz Aguilar (penalty scored); Terence Vella (penalty scored)		(penalty scored) Gabriel Bohrer; (penalty scored) Jackson Mendoza; (penalty scored) Marko Cosic; (penalty scored) Lucas Ribeiro De Oliveira; (penalty missed) Jefferson De Assis

26 April 2023	Birkirkara (1)	4–3	Mosta (1)	Ta' Qali
19:00 CEST	Denis Custodio Ribeiro 43'; Enzo Daniel Cabrera 52', 80' (pen.), 90+2'		Enrico Pepe 60' (o.g.); Chidera Micheal Okoh 72', 87'	Stadium: Ta' Qali National Stadium; Referee: Philip Farrugia

== Final ==
The match was played on 30 April 2023.

Birkirkara reached their eleventh Maltese FA Trophy finals having won it five times. Marsaxlokk reached their second finals and never won it. This will be the first time both clubs meet each other in the final. The last time Birkirkara and Marsaxlokk met together in the FA Trophy was the 2007–08 season in the Quarter-finals when Birkirkara beat Marsaxlokk by 2–1.

30 April 2023	Birkirkara (1)	2–0	Marsaxlokk (1)	Ta' Qali
16:00 CEST	Osvaldo Iorio 77'; Claudio Bonanni 85' (o.g.)			Stadium: Ta' Qali National Stadium; Attendance: 4,128; Referee: Trustin Farrugia Cann

=== Top scorers ===
As of 30 May 2023

Rank	Player	Club	Goals
1	(Brazil) Pablo Vinicius De Moraes Ferreira	Kercem Ajax	5
2	(Malta) Lydon Cuschieri	Attard	3
2	(Brazil) Claudio Henrique Da Silva Barbosa	Ghajnsielem	3
2	(Brazil) Lucas Ribeiro De Oliveira	Gzira United	3
2	(Democratic Republic of the Congo) Elvis Mashike Sukisa	Hamrun Spartans	3
2	(Brazil) Bruno Da Cruz	Kercem Ajax	3
2	(Argentina) Santiago Fabian Moracci	Marsaxlokk	3
2	(Brazil) Gustavo Dourado Ferreira	Nadur Youngsters	3
2	(Serbia) Igor Nedeljkovic	Nadur Youngsters	3
2	(Colombia) Robinson Blandon Rendon	Naxxar Lions	3
2	(Brazil) David Oliveira Souza	Zabbar St.Patrick	3

== Television rights ==
The following matches were broadcast live on TVMSports+:

Round	TVMSports+
Round of 32	Gzira United vs Sliema Wanderers Floriana vs Santa Lucia
Round of 16	Balzan vs Birkirkara Valletta vs Ħamrun Spartans
Quarter-finals	Birkirkara vs Ħamrun Spartans Hibernians vs Marsaxlokk
Semi-finals	Marsaxlokk vs Gżira United Birkirkara vs Mosta
Final	Birkirkara vs Marsaxlokk
