= 2017 Maltese Super Cup =

Hibernians	Floriana
0	1
- Date: 13 December 2017
- Venue: Ta' Qali National Stadium, Ta' Qali, Malta
- Referee: Fyodor Zammit
- Attendance: 1,241

The 2017 Maltese Super Cup was the 33rd Maltese Super Cup, an annual football match played between the title holders of the Maltese Premier League and the Maltese FA Trophy. It was contested by Hibernians, winners of the 2016–17 Maltese Premier League, and Floriana, the winners of the 2016–17 Maltese FA Trophy, at Ta' Qali National Stadium on 13 December 2017. Floriana won 1–0 to win their second Maltese Super Cup.

== Match ==
=== Details ===
13 December 2017
14:00 CET

Hibernians	0–1	Floriana
	Report	Fontanella 33'

Ta' Qali National Stadium, Ta' Qali
Attendance: 1,241
Referee: Fyodor Zammit

GK	1	(Malta) Andrew Hogg
DF	20	(Malta) Andrei Agius
DF	5	(Austria) Martin Kreuzriegler
DF	6	(Equatorial Guinea) Rui
DF	4	(Malta) Dunstan Vella
MF	13	(Malta) Clayton Failla	(substituted off) 81'
FW	9	(Brazil) Marcelo Dias	(yellow card) 88'
MF	19	(Malta) Johann Bezzina	(substituted off) 61'
MF	11	(Malta) Bjorn Kristensen	(substituted off) 73'
FW	22	(Malta) Joseph Mbong
FW	10	(Malta) Jurgen Degabriele
Substitutes:
GK	24	(Malta) Rudy Briffa
MF	7	(Brazil) Jackson Lima	(substituted on) 61'
FW	26	(Brazil) Jorge Elias dos Santos	(substituted on) 81'
MF		(Brazil) Marco Morgon
MF	31	(Austria) Marco Sahanek	(substituted on) 73'
MF	30	(Malta) David Xuereb
DF	18	(Malta) Connor Zammit
Manager:
(Malta) Mario Muscat

GK		(Malta) Ini Etim Akpan
DF		(Malta) Alexander Cini
DF	5	(Italy) Enrico Pepe	(yellow card) 54'
MF	6	(Argentina) Enzo Ruiz	(yellow card) 28'
MF		(Brazil) Marcelina Emerson	(yellow card) 90+3'
MF		(Malta) Clyde Borg	(substituted off) 66'
MF		(Malta) Dylan Grima
FW	11	(Italy) Maurizio Vella	(substituted off) 86'
MF	7	(Malta) Steve Pisani
FW	89	(Italy) Mario Fontanella
FW	23	(Brazil) Juninho Cabral
Substitutes:
GK	24	(Malta) Matthew Grech
DF	26	(Brazil) Arthur Henrique Ricciardi Oyama	(substituted on) 66'
DW	3	(Malta) James Baldacchino
FW		(Malta) Leighton Grech	(substituted on) 86'
DF	17	(Malta) Jurgen Pisani
MF		(Malta) Bradley Sciberras
DF	14	(Malta) Neil Spiteri
Manager:
(Argentina) Nicolás Chiesa

Assistant referees:
Thomas Debono
Luke Portelli
Fourth official:
Paul Apap
