= 2018 Maltese Super Cup =

| Valletta | Balzan |
| 2 | 1 |
- Date: 13 December 2018
- Venue: Ta' Qali National Stadium, Ta' Qali, Malta
- Referee: Trustin Farrugia Cann
- Attendance: 2,241

The 2018 Maltese Super Cup was the 34th Maltese Super Cup, an annual football match played between the title holders of the Maltese Premier League and the Maltese FA Trophy. It was contested on 13 December 2018 by Valletta – who won a league and FA Trophy double the previous season – and Balzan, who finished runners-up in the league. Played at the Ta' Qali National Stadium, Valletta won the match 2–1.

This was Balzan's first ever Super Cup final, playing against a Valletta side who won the previous season's league title on the last day following Balzan's defeat. Valletta were looking to winning their third honour for the year, making a return to this cup final after their win in the 2016 final against Sliema Wanderers.

== Match ==
=== Details ===
13 December 2018
15:00 CET

| Valletta | 2–1 | Balzan |
|---|---|---|
| Johnson 9' (o.g.); Fontanella 77' | Report | Lecão 36' |

Ta' Qali National Stadium, Ta' Qali
Attendance: 2,241
Referee: Trustin Farrugia Cann

| GK | (Malta) Henry Bonello |
| DF | (Malta) Jonathan Caruana |
| DF | (Malta) Steve Borg |
| MF | (Dominican Republic) Enmy Peña |
| MF | (Oman) Raed Ibrahim Saleh |
| MF | (Malta) Rowen Muscat | (yellow card) 54' |
| MF | (Argentina) Miguel Alba | | (substituted off) 85' |
| FW | (Argentina) Santiago Malano |
| FW | (Italy) Matteo Picciolo | (yellow card) 90' |
| FW | (Montenegro) Bojan Kaljević | (yellow card) 25' | (substituted off) 81' |
| FW | (Italy) Mario Fontanella | (yellow card) 89' | (substituted off) 90' |
Substitutes:
| GK | (Malta) Yenz Cini |
| DF | (Malta) Ryan Camilleri |
| DF | (Malta) Jean Borg | | (substituted on) 81' |
| DF | (Malta) Nicholas Pulis | | (substituted on) 90' |
| MF | (Malta) Joseph Zerafa |
| FW | (Malta) Russell Fenech |
| FW | (Malta) Kyrian Nwoko | | (substituted on) 85' |
Manager:
(Serbia) Danilo Dončić

| GK | (Malta) Steve Sultana |
| DF | (Malta) Justin Grioli | | (substituted off) 46' |
| DF | (Malta) Dale Camilleri | | (substituted off) 76' |
| DF | (Serbia) Uroš Ljubomirac |
| DF | (Serbia) Ivan Božović | (yellow card) 90' |
| DF | (Colombia) Elkin Serrano | (yellow card) 90+4' |
| MF | (Serbia) Nenad Šljivić |
| MF | (Malta) Michael Johnson | | (substituted off) 87' |
| MF | (Brazil) Lecão | (yellow card) 37' |
| FW | (Brazil) Cadú | (yellow card) 63' |
| FW | (Malta) Alfred Effiong |
Substitutes:
| GK | (Malta) Sean Mintoff |
| DF | (Malta) Steve Bezzina | | (substituted on) 46' |
| DF | (Malta) Gary Camilleri |
| MF | (Malta) Sean Cipriott |
| FW | (Malta) Lydon Micallef | | (substituted on) 87' |
| FW | (Malta) Siraj Arab |
| FW | (Serbia) Andrija Majdevac | | (substituted on) 76' |
Manager:
(Serbia) Marko Mićović

Assistant referees:
Alan Camilleri
Christopher Francalanza
Fourth official:
Stefan Pace
