= Nicolás Chiesa =

Argentine footballer

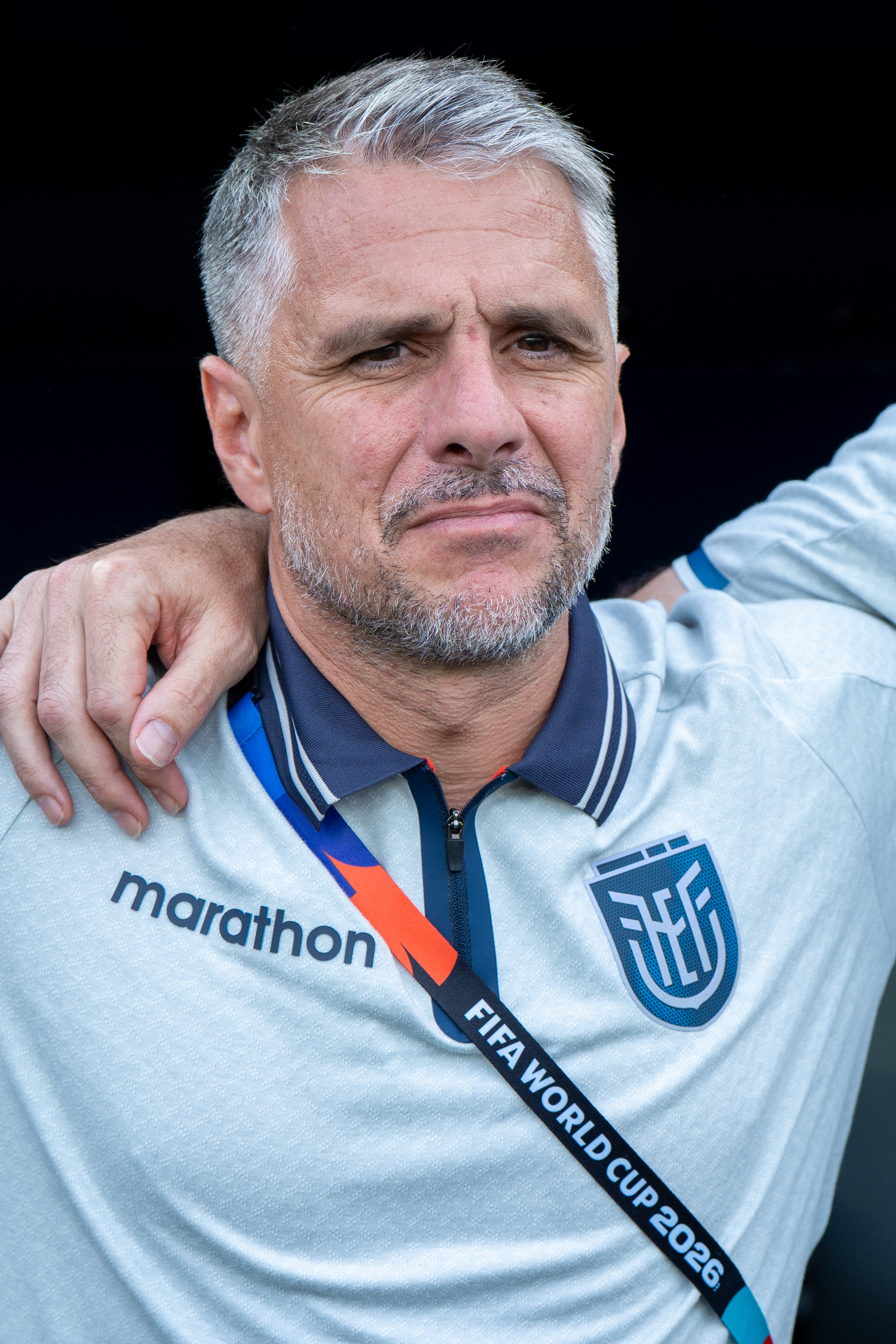

Personal information
- Full name: Nicolás Hernán Chiesa
- Date of birth: 26 May 1980 (age 46)
- Place of birth: Buenos Aires, Argentina
- Height: 1.66 m (5 ft 5 in)
- Position: Forward

Team information
- Current team: Cúcuta Deportivo (manager)

Youth career
- Nueva Chicago

Senior career*
Years	Team	Apps	(Gls)
2001–2002	Nueva Chicago	0	(0)
2002	Almirante Brown de Arrecifes	17	(1)
2003–2004	Instituto de Córdoba	2	(0)
2004	Cañuelas	14	(2)
2005	Politehnica Iași	2	(0)
2006–2008	Grottaglie	72	(31)
2008–2009	Brindisi	34	(6)
2009–2010	Pisa	27	(6)
2010–2011	Forza e Coraggio	34	(13)
2011–2012	Martina Franca	30	(7)
2012–2015	Lupa Roma	75	(14)
2015–2017	Floriana	63	(11)
Total		370	(91)

Managerial career
- 2017–2018: Floriana
- 2019: Boca Juniors (scout)
- 2020–2022: Ecuador (analyst)
- 2023–2024: Independiente (assistant)
- 2024–2026: Ecuador (assistant)
- 2026–: Cúcuta Deportivo
- * Club domestic league appearances and goals

Nicolás Hernán Chiesa (born 26 May 1980) is an Argentine former footballer who played as a forward and a manager, currently in charge of Colombian club Cúcuta Deportivo.

== Coaching career ==
On 5 December 2017, Chiesa was appointed manager of Maltese club Floriana. He was fired on 27 August 2018.

At the end of December 2018 it was confirmed, that Chiesa had been hired at Boca Juniors, where he was to deal with scouting and monitoring possible reinforcements in the different leagues. He left his position at the end of 2019.

In 2020, Chiesa joined the coaching staff of the Ecuador national team under manager Gustavo Alfaro, with his main task being to scout and analyze the Ecuadorian players featuring in Europe. From 2023 to 2024, Chiesa was an assistant to Carlos Tevez at Independiente, and later returned to the Ecuador national team, now as an assistant to Sebastián Becaccece.

On 16 August 2026, Chiesa was appointed as manager of Colombian club Cúcuta Deportivo.

== Honours ==
=== Player ===
Almirante Brown

- Primera B: 2006–07

Floriana

- Maltese FA Trophy: 2016–17

=== Manager ===
Floriana

- Maltese Super Cup: 2017
