= Mario Fontanella =

Italian footballer

Personal information
- Full name: Mario Fontanella
- Date of birth: 28 June 1989 (age 37)
- Place of birth: Naples, Italy
- Height: 1.76 m (5 ft 9 in)
- Position: Forward

Team information
- Current team: Żabbar St. Patrick F.C.
- Number: 89

Youth career
- 2003–2008: Napoli

Senior career*
Years	Team	Apps	(Gls)
2008-2009	Barletta	7	(0)
1/2009	Viribus Unitis	14	(4)
2009–2011	Neapolis Mugnano	47	(16)
2011–2012	Noto Calcio	46	(19)
1/2013	Sarnese	12	(2)
2013–2014	Bastia	30	(13)
2014–2015	Budoni	32	(27)
2015–2018	Floriana	97	(57)
2018–2022	Valletta	116	(58)
2022–2023	Al-Muharraq	26	(9)
2023–2025	Al-Yarmouk	41	(21)
2025-2027	Żabbar St. Patrick F.C.	46	(18)

International career
2020	Malta		
2009	Italy		
- * Club domestic league appearances and goals

Mario Fontanella (born 28 June 1989) is an Italian footballer who plays as a forward for Zabbar in the Malta Premier league.

== Club career ==
=== Italy ===
Born and raised in Naples, Mario began his professional footballing career in 2008 with Barletta-based A.S.D. Barletta 1922 making five appearances in the 2008–09 Lega Pro Seconda Divisione. He then moved to Serie D side Pol. Viribus Unitis where he scored four goals in 14 appearances for his side in the remaining of the 2008–09 Serie D season.

He then moved to Mugnano di Napoli where he signed a two-year contract with Neapolis. He scored 16 goals in 32 appearances in the 2009–10 Serie D helping his side earn promotion to the Lega Pro Seconda Divisione. In the 2010–11 Lega Pro Seconda Divisione season, the Italian striker failed to score any goal in 15 appearances.

In 2011, he moved to Noto where he signed a two-year contract with Serie D side, Noto Calcio and scored 16 goals in 31 appearances in the 2011–12 Serie D.

Later in 2013, he moved to Sarno where he signed a short-term contract with another Serie D side, A.S.D. Pol. Sarnese Calcio.

He then moved to Bastia Umbra where he signed a one-year contract with A.C. Bastia 1924. He scored 13 goals in 30 appearances in the 2013–14 Serie D.

His most remarkable season in Italy was with Budoni-based, A.S.D. Pol. Calcio Budoni where he scored 27 goals in 30 appearances in the 2014–15 Serie D and was awarded the top scorer award for the season.

=== Malta ===
He first moved out of Italy in 2015 to the neighboring Malta where he signed a long-term contract with Maltese Premier League side, Floriana. He made his official debut for the club on 22 August 2015 in a 2–1 defeat against Mosta and scored his first goal on 12 September 2015 in a 3–0 win over Qormi He made his Maltese FA Trophy debut on 20 January 2016 in a 2–1 win over Lija Athletic F.C. He finished the 2015–16 Maltese Premier League season with 20 goals in 31 appearances.

He made his first appearance in the 2016–17 Maltese Premier League and scored his first goal in the competition on 20 August 2016 in a 2-1 win over Pembroke Athleta F.C. He made his first appearance and scored his first goal in the 2016–17 Maltese FA Trophy on 18 January 2017 in a 4-1 win over Għajnsielem F.C. He scored 14 goals in 29 appearances in the 2016–17 Maltese Premier League and scored 2 goals in 4 appearances in the Maltese FA Trophy helping his side win the prestigious competition for that season.

His performances in the Maltese Premier League also saw him briefly linked to English National League club FC Halifax Town during the summer of 2017, though stayed put with Floriana for another season.

He also made his UEFA Europa League debut on 29 June 2017 in a 3-0 loss against Serbian giants, Red Star Belgrade.

He finished his three-year career with Floriana FC, having scored 57 goals in 97 matches and won an FA Trophy, Super Cup and a Premier League Top Scorer title.

Following the end of his contract, on 13 May 2018, he joined cross-town rivals Valletta, signing a three-year contract.

In June 2020, Mario Fontanella was called up to the Malta national team for the pre-season camp regarding the application for Maltese citizenship on sporting merit by the Maltese Federation. With Valletta till may 2022, he scored 58 goals in 116 matches and managed to win two Super Cups, a Premier League and was named the league's best striker for two years. In July 2025, he moved to Zabbar St Patrick and scored his 100th goal in the Malta Premier Leaguea and finished the season with 12 goals and 4 assists.In July 2026 renewed contract with Zabbar St Patrick for another season in Malta Premier League.

=== Bahrain ===
In July 2022, he moved to Muharraq, the nation's most important club, as president of the King of Bahrain. In Bahrain, he became the first Italian to play for Bahrain. He finished second in the Bahrain Premier League and scored nine goals. His historic brace in the derby against rivals Riffa in front of a packed stadium was a memorable one.

=== Kuwait ===
In July 2023, he moved to Kuwait with Yarmouk in the first division. He had a fantastic season, finishing as the league's top foreign player. He won the top scorer award and the Kuwait Division One championship. In June 2024, he renewed his contract with Yarmouk for another year and had an excellent season in the Kuwait Premier League.

== Honours ==
Neapolis Mugnano

- Italy Serie D: 2009-2010

Budoni

- Top Scorer Italy Serie D: 2014–15

Floriana

- Maltese FA Trophy: 2016–17
- Maltese Super Cup: 2017
- Top Scorer Maltese Premier League: 2015–16

Valletta

- Maltese Premier League: 2018–19
- Maltese Super Cup: 2018
- Maltese Super Cup: 2019

Al-Yarmouk

- kuwait Division 1: 2023–24
- Top Scorer Kuwait Division 1: 2023–24
