= Shaun Dimech =

Maltese footballer

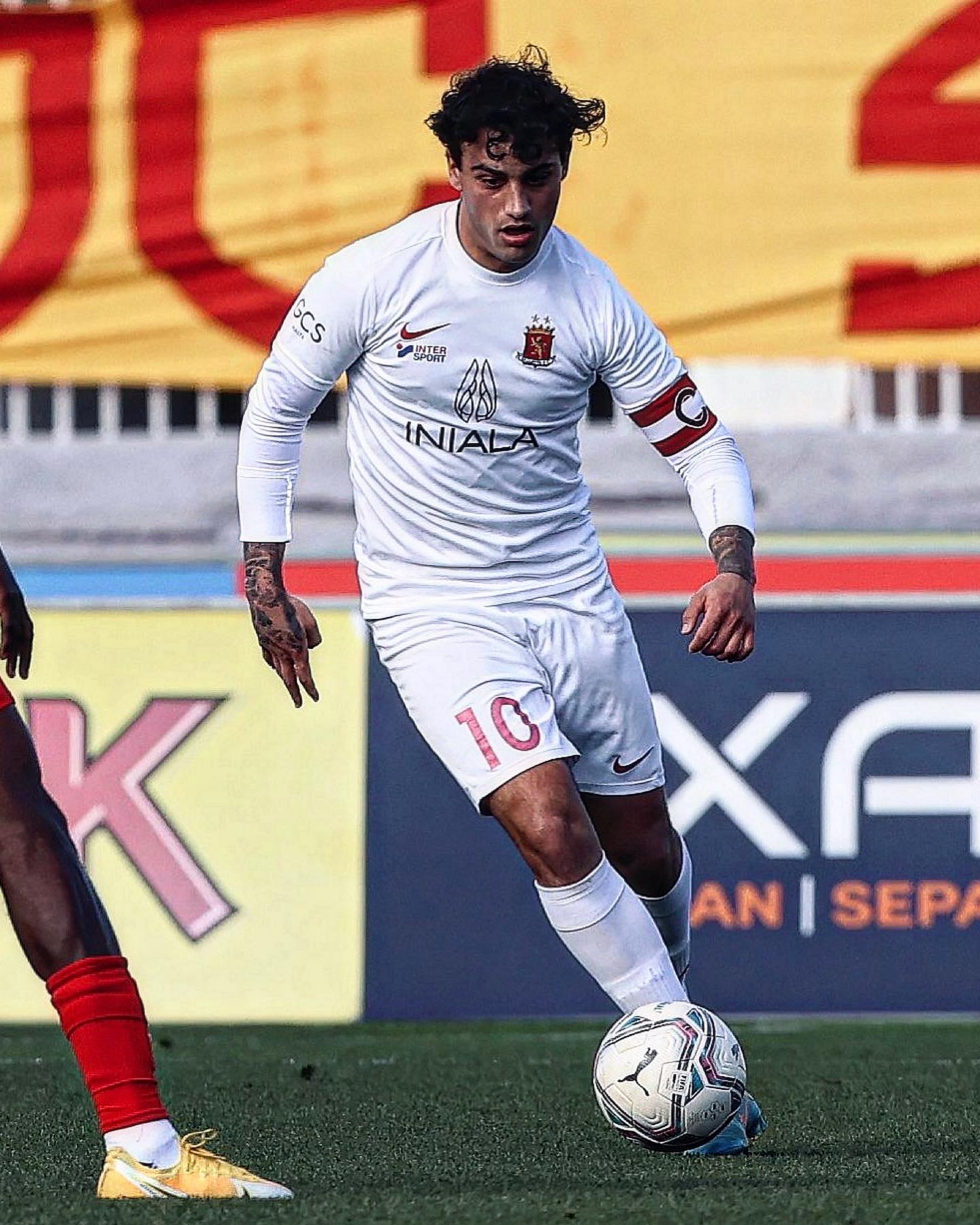
- Dimech playing for Valletta in 2023

Personal information
- Full name: Shaun Dimech
- Date of birth: 8 August 2001 (age 25)
- Place of birth: Malta
- Height: 1.83 m (6 ft 0 in)
- Position: Midfielder

Team information
- Current team: Birżebbuġa St. Peter's
- Number: 7

Youth career
- Valletta
- Pietà Hotspurs
- Valletta

Senior career*
Years	Team	Apps	(Gls)
2016–2024	Valletta	107	(21)
2024	Borac Banja Luka	0	(0)
2024–2026	Birkirkara	50	(1)
2026–	Birżebbuġa St. Peter's	8	(0)

International career^{‡}
2016–2017	Malta U17	6	(0)
2017–2019	Malta U19	9	(0)
2019–	Malta U21	3	(0)
2020–	Malta	19	(2)
- * Club domestic league appearances and goals as of 7 November 2026 ‡ National team caps and goals as of 26 June 2025

Shaun Dimech (born 8 August 2001) is a Maltese footballer who plays as a midfielder for Birżebbuġa St. Peter's.

== Career ==
Dimech made his international debut for Malta on 7 October 2020 in a friendly match against Gibraltar.

=== Birkirkara ===
On 22 July 2024, he signed for Birkirkara.

=== Birżebbuġa St. Peter's ===
On 29 July 2026 he signed for Birżebbuġa St. Peter's.

== Career statistics ==
As of match played 18 October 2026

Appearances and goals by club, season and competition
Club	Season	League			Cup		Europe		Other		Total	
Club	Season	Division	Apps	Goals	Apps	Goals	Apps	Goals	Apps	Goals	Apps	Goals
Valletta	2016–17	Maltese Premier League	0	0	0	0	0	0	0	0	0	0
Valletta	2017–18	Maltese Premier League	0	0	0	0	0	0	0	0	0	0
Valletta	2018–19	Maltese Premier League	0	0	0	0	0	0	0	0	0	0
Valletta	2019–20	Maltese Premier League	0	0	0	0	0	0	0	0	0	0
Valletta	2020–21	Maltese Premier League	0	0	0	0	0	0	0	0	0	0
Valletta	2021–22	Maltese Premier League	0	0	0	0	0	0	0	0	0	0
Valletta	2022–23	Maltese Premier League	0	0	0	0	0	0	0	0	0	0
Valletta	2023–24	Maltese Premier League	0	0	0	0	0	0	0	0	0	0
Borac Banja Luka	2024–25	Premier League	0	0	0	0	0	0	0	0	0	0
Birkirkara	2024–25	Maltese Premier League	0	0	0	0	0	0	0	0	0	0
Birkirkara	2025–26	Maltese Premier League	0	0	0	0	0	0	0	0	0	0
Birżebbuġa St. Peter's	2026–27	Maltese Premier League	0	0	0	0	0	0	0	0	0	0
Career total			0	0	0	0	0	0	0	0	0	0

=== International ===
As of 4 June 2021

Malta
Year	Apps	Goals
2020	4	1
2021	9	1
2022	3	0
Total	16	2

== International goals ==
Scores and results list Malta's goal tally first.

No.	Date	Venue	Opponent	Score	Result	Competition
1.	14 November 2020	National Stadium, Ta' Qali, Malta	Andorra	3–1	3–1	2020–21 UEFA Nations League
2.	4 June 2021	Wörthersee Stadion, Klagenfurt, Austria	Kosovo	1–1	1–2	Friendly

== Honours ==
Valletta

- Maltese Premier Leagueː 2015–16, 2017–18, 2018–19
- Maltese FA Trophy̠ː 2017–18
- Maltese Super Cupː 2018, 2019

Birkirkara

- Maltese Premier Leagueː 2024–25
- Maltese FA Trophyː Runner-Up 2024–25

Pietà Hotspurs

- Republika Srpska Cup: 2024–25
