= Kyrian Nwoko =

Maltese footballer

Personal information
- Date of birth: 4 July 1997 (age 29)
- Place of birth: Valletta, Malta
- Height: 6 ft 2 in (1.88 m)
- Positions: Winger; forward

Team information
- Current team: Sliema Wanderers
- Number: 21

Senior career*
Years	Team	Apps	(Gls)
2014–2017	St. Andrews	82	(14)
2017–2021	Valletta	75	(12)
2021	→ St Patrick's Athletic (loan)	8	(0)
2022–2025	Floriana	40	(4)
2023	→ Saint Lucia (loan)	8	(2)
2025–	Sliema Wanderers	26	(2)

International career^{‡}
- Malta U17
2017–	Malta	38	(4)
- * Club domestic league appearances and goals as of 23:57, 14 April 2026 (UTC) ‡ National team caps and goals as of 00:00, 15 April 2026 (UTC)

Kyrian Nwoko (born 4 July 1997) is a Maltese professional footballer who plays as a winger and forward for Sliema Wanderers and the Malta national team. He has previously played for Maltese clubs St. Andrews, Valletta, Floriana and Saint Lucia, as well as Irish club St Patrick's Athletic.

== Personal life ==
He is the son of the Nigerian-born former Maltese international footballer Chucks Nwoko.

== Club career ==
In July 2014, Nwoko was linked with a possible transfer to English clubs Huddersfield Town and Crystal Palace. He moved from St. Andrews to Valletta in June 2017. In July 2021, he was linked with a move to NIFL Premiership side Linfield. Following a transfer fee being agreed between the two clubs, the transfer was held up over obtaining a work permit under new Brexit regulations. On 27 July 2021, Valletta announced that they had agreed a deal with League of Ireland Premier Division club St Patrick's Athletic for Nwoko to move on a 6-month loan deal with the option to make the transfer permanent. The transfer was completed on 28 July 2021, with Nwoko becoming the second striker to sign for the club on that day, after Reading's Nahum Melvin-Lambert. Nwoko made his debut for the club on 30 July 2021, coming off the bench in the 87th minute of the Dublin derby away to Shamrock Rovers at Tallaght Stadium. On 28 November 2021 Nwoko was an unused substitute in the 2021 FAI Cup Final, as his side defeated rivals Bohemians 4–3 on penalties following a 1–1 draw after extra time in front of a record FAI Cup final crowd of 37,126 at the Aviva Stadium. On 31 August 2022, Nwoko returned to football after 9 months out of the game, returning to Malta and signing for Floriana. On 27 January 2023, he signed for Saint Lucia on loan until the end of the season. On 1 January 2025, Nwoko signed for Sliema Wanderers on a permanent basis.

== International career ==
He made two appearances for Malta at the 2014 UEFA European Under-17 Championship. He made his senior national team debut in November 2017 in the 0–3 defeat against Estonia. On 23 March 2019, Nwoko scored his first goal in a 2–1 win over Faroe Islands, as Malta won their first competitive home match in 13 years. In January 2022, Nwoko accused the Malta national team selectors of 'unfair' treatment over not being selected for the team allegedly due to his refusal to take a COVID-19 vaccine when the squad were asked to take a Johnson & Johnson vaccine in May 2021 ahead of their departure to a training camp in Austria. In November 2022, Nwoko returned to the national team, accepting his call up for the friendly games against Greece and the Republic of Ireland.

== Career statistics ==
=== Club ===
As of match played on 10 January 2026

Appearances and goals by club, season and competition
Club	Season	League			National Cup (Note: Includes Maltese FA Trophy & FAI Cup)		Europe		Other		Total	
Club	Season	Division	Apps	Goals	Apps	Goals	Apps	Goals	Apps	Goals	Apps	Goals
St. Andrews	2013–14	Maltese Challenge League	0	0	1	0	—		—		1	0
St. Andrews	2014–15	Maltese Challenge League	24	5	0	0	—		—		24	5
St. Andrews	2015–16	Maltese Premier League	27	5	2	0	—		1 (Note: Appearances in the Maltese Premier League Relegation Play-offs)	1	30	6
St. Andrews	2016–17	Maltese Premier League	31	4	1	0	—		—		32	4
St. Andrews	Total		82	14	4	0	—		1	1	87	15
Valletta	2017–18	Maltese Premier League	26	6	4	2	4 (Note: Appearances in the UEFA Europa League)	0	—		34	8
Valletta	2018–19	Maltese Premier League	21	2	3	0	4 (Note: 2 appearances in the UEFA Champions League & 2 appearances in the UEFA Europa League)	0	1 (Note: Appearances in the Maltese Super Cup)	0	29	2
Valletta	2019–20	Maltese Premier League	13	2	0	0	5 (Note: 4 appearances in the UEFA Champions League & 1 appearance in the UEFA Europa League)	0	1	1	19	3
Valletta	2020–21	Maltese Premier League	15	2	1	0	1	0	—		17	2
Valletta	Total		75	12	8	2	14	0	2	1	99	15
St Patrick's Athletic (loan)	2021	LOI Premier Division	8	0	1	0	—		—		9	0
Floriana	2022–23	Maltese Premier League	9	0	1	0	—		0	0	10	0
Floriana	2023–24	Maltese Premier League	19	1	3	1	—		—		22	2
Floriana	2024–25	Maltese Premier League	12	3	–		3 (Note: Appearances in the UEFA Conference League)	1	—		15	4
Floriana	Total		40	4	4	1	3	1	0	0	47	6
Saint Lucia (loan)	2022–23	Maltese Premier League	8	2	1	0	–		1 (Note: Appearance in the 2022–23 Maltese Premier League Relegation play-offs)	1	10	3
Sliema Wanderers	2024–25	Maltese Premier League	14	2	2	2	–		—		16	4
Sliema Wanderers	2025–26	Maltese Premier League	12	0	1	0	–		4 (Note: Appearances in the Malta FA Jubilee Cup)	0	17	0
Sliema Wanderers	Total		26	2	3	2	–		4	0	31	4
Career total			239	34	21	5	17	1	8	3	287	43

=== International ===
As of match played 7 June 2025

National team	Year	Apps	Goals
Malta	2017	1	0
Malta	2018	3	0
Malta	2019	9	1
Malta	2020	4	2
Malta	2021	3	0
Malta	2022	1	0
Malta	2023	9	1
Malta	2024	5	0
Malta	2025	3	0
Total		38	4

=== International goals ===
Scores and results list Malta's goal tally first.

No.	Date	Venue	Opponent	Score	Result	Competition
1.	23 March 2019	National Stadium, Ta' Qali, Malta	Faroe Islands	1–0	2–1	UEFA Euro 2020 qualification
2.	6 September 2020	National Stadium, Ta' Qali, Malta	Latvia	1–0	1–1	2020–21 UEFA Nations League D
3.	7 October 2020	National Stadium, Ta' Qali, Malta	Gibraltar	1–0	2–0	Friendly
4.	9 June 2023	Stade de Luxembourg, Luxembourg City, Luxembourg	Luxembourg	1–0	1–0	Friendly

== Honours ==
Valletta

- Maltese Premier League: 2017–18, 2018–19
- Maltese FA Trophy: 2017–18
- Maltese Super Cup: 2018, 2019

St Patrick's Athletic

- FAI Cup: 2021
