= 2026 Maltese Super Cup =

- Event: BOV Super Cup
Floriana	Valletta
0	2
- Date: 7 September 2026
- Venue: Ta' Qali National Stadium, Ta' Qali, Malta
- Referee: Glen Tonna

The 2026 Maltese Super Cup was the 41st Maltese Super Cup, an annual football match played between the title holders of the Maltese Premier League and the Maltese FA Trophy. It was contested on 7 September 2026 by Valletta – who won the FA Trophy, after defeating Gżira in the final and Floriana who won the Premier League the previous season. The game was played at the Ta' Qali National Stadium, Valletta won the match 2–0.

== Match ==
=== Details ===
2026 Maltese Super Cup
7 September 2026
19:00 CEST (UTC+02:00)
Final

Floriana	0–2	Valletta
	Report	Drina (o.g.); Zammit 61'

Ta' Qali National Stadium, Ta' Qali
Referee: Glen Tonna

Floriana
GK	23	(Brazil) Guilherme Cioletti
DF	3	(Malta) Myles Beerman		(substituted off) 67'
DF	6	(Bosnia and Herzegovina) Amar Drina
DF	17	(Malta) Owen Spiteri
DF	21	(Malta) Carlo Lonardelli	(yellow card) 64'
MF	10	(Argentina) Federico Varela
MF	12	(Malta) Dunstan Vella ( c)
MF	16	(Argentina) Gaston Romano		(substituted off) 67'
FW	8	(Malta) Paul Mbong	Sent off (straight red)
FW	9	(Bosnia and Herzegovina) Kenan Dervisagic		(substituted off) 46'
FW	22	(Croatia) Tomislav Gudelj		(substituted off) 67'
Substitutes
GK	13	(Malta) Alexey Micallef
GK	80	(Spain) Pablo Picon
DF	5	(Malta) Gerrard Cann Rodgers
MF	11	(Croatia) Robert Muric		(substituted on) 67'
MF	14	(Bosnia and Herzegovina) Alen Kurtalic		(substituted on) 67'
MF	20	(Malta) Emerson Piscopo
MF	27	(Malta) Zyas Vella Newell
DF	37	(Morocco) Yassine Jbira		(substituted on) 67'
DF	86	(Malta) Nikita Shchepetkin
FW	90	(Nigeria) Stephen Pius Odey		(substituted on) 46'
FW	99	(Malta) Denzel Attard
Manager
(Portugal) Daniel Portela

Valletta
GK	90	(Brazil) Adilson Maringa
DF	3	(Malta) Mattias Ellul		(substituted off) 90'
DF	4	(Bosnia and Herzegovina) Ermin Bicakcic
DF	33	(Cameroon) Emmanuel Mbende
DF	55	(Serbia) Sava Radic
MF	19	(Portugal) Diogo Tavares		(substituted off) 90'
MF	21	(Croatia) Roko Prsa		(substituted off) 76'
MF	23	(Montenegro) Petar Sekulovic
MF	11	(Malta) Jake Azzopardi ( c)
FW	8	(Malta) Andrea Zammit	(yellow card) 63'	(substituted off) 67'
FW	32	(Brazil) Alex Gomes		(substituted off) 76'
Substitutes
GK	1	(Saint Kitts and Nevis) Julani Archibald
GK	13	(Malta) Liam Frendo	(yellow card) 63'
FW	5	(Malta) Sky Chetcuti
FW	9	(Brazil) Bruno Gomes		(substituted on) 76'
MF	10	(Malta) Brandon Paiber	(yellow card) 85'	(substituted on) 76'
MF	18	(Malta) Mattiaz Ancilleri
DF	31	(Malta) Liam James
DF	44	(Malta) Neil Anthony Micallef		(substituted on) 90'
MF	80	(Malta) Keyon Ewurum		(substituted on) 67'
DF	94	(Argentina) Manuel Morello		(substituted on) 90'
MF	98	(Malta) Zaiden Formosa
Manager
(Malta) Thane Micallef

Assistant referees
(Malta) Jurgen Spiteri
(Malta) Mark Ciantar
