= Irakli Dzaria =

Georgian professional footballer

Personal information
- Full name: Irakli Dzaria
- Date of birth: 1 December 1988 (age 37)
- Place of birth: Poti, Georgian SSR
- Height: 1.75 m (5 ft 9 in)
- Position: Defensive midfielder

Team information
- Current team: Shukura (assistant manager)

Youth career
- 2003–2004: Kolkheti-1913

Senior career*
| Years | Team | Apps | (Gls) |
| 2004–2005 | Kolkheti-1913 | 30 | (6) |
| 2005–2011 | Zestaponi | 108 | (8) |
| 2012–2015 | Dinamo Tbilisi | 76 | (9) |
| 2015–2016 | Dila Gori | 24 | (2) |
| 2016–2017 | Sioni | 10 | (2) |
| 2017–2018 | Dila Gori | 30 | (3) |
| 2018–2019 | Kukësi | 43 | (5) |
| 2019 | Valletta | 10 | (2) |
| 2020–2022 | Torpedo Kutaisi | 40 | (2) |

International career^{‡}
| 2006–2009 | Georgia U21 | 3 | (0) |
| 2012–2014 | Georgia | 9 | (1) |
- * Club domestic league appearances and goals as of 26 July 2023 ‡ National team caps and goals as of 19 March 2017

Irakli Dzaria (born 1 December 1988) is a former Georgian professional footballer, who played as a defensive midfielder.

He is the four-time winner of the Georgian top league.

In July 2023, he was appointed as assistant manager at Shukura Kobuleti.

== Club career ==
=== Kukësi ===
On 9 January 2018, Dzaria moved for the first time aboard and joined with Albanian club Kukësi by penning a contract until the end of the season with an option to renew for the next one worth $4,000 per month. He made his debut for the club on 31 January in the first leg of cup's quarter-finals against Tirana.

His first Albanian Superliga appearance came four days later in the 1–1 draw versus Flamurtari Vlorë. Dzaria scored his maiden goal for the team on 24 February in form of a winner in the match against Laçi.

Later on 13 May, he scored a first-half brace in the eventual 2–2 draw versus Luftëtari Gjirokastër which lifted his tally up to 4 goals. He ended the second part of 2017–18 season by making 16 league appearances, all of them as starter, collecting 1320 minutes as Kukësi finished runner-up in the championship.

In June 2018, Kukësi gained the right to play UEFA Champions League football following the Skënderbeu Korçë's 10-year ban; the next month, Dzaria was included in manager Peter Pacult squad for the first qualifying round tie versus Malta's Valletta. In the second leg, with Kukësi trailing 0–1, Dzaria made himself a protagonist by netting in the 84th minute with a right-footed shot inside the box which gave the team a 1–1 draw at National Stadium, Ta' Qali. With the first match ending in a goalless draw, Kukësi progressed to the next round on away goal rule. It was his first Champions League goal, and he described it as the most important goal of his career.

== International career ==
Dzaria earned his first cap with the Georgian national team against Albania in Viseu on 29 February 2012.

=== International goals ===
Scores and results list Georgia's goal tally first.

| No | Date | Venue | Opponent | Score | Result | Competition |
|---|---|---|---|---|---|---|
| 1. | 5 June 2013 | Nordjyske Arena, Aalborg, Denmark | Denmark | 1–0 | 1–2 | Friendly |

== Honours ==
FC Zestaponi

- Georgian League: 2010–11

Dinamo Tbilisi

- Georgian League:2012–13, 2013–14, 2014–15
- Georgian Cup: 2013, 2014
- Georgian Super Cup: 2014

Valletta F.C.

- Maltese Super Cup: 2019–20
