= Simon Zibo =

Ghanaian professional footballer

Personal information
- Date of birth: 30 November 1997 (age 28)
- Place of birth: Ghana
- Position: Midfielder

Team information
- Current team: Mosta
- Number: 42

Senior career*
Years	Team	Apps	(Gls)
2016–2019	Liberty Professionals	55	(8)
2019–2020	Vitória Guimarães B	0	(0)
2020–2022	Esperança de Lagos	23	(1)
2023–2024	Birkirkara	40	(3)
2024–2025	Sliema Wanderers	32	(4)
2025–	Mosta	21	(2)

International career
2019	Ghana U23	2	(0)
- * Club domestic league appearances and goals as of 18 May 2026

Simon Zibo (born 30 November 1997) is a Ghanaian professional footballer who plays as a midfielder for Maltese team Mosta. He previously played for Portuguese teams Vitória Guimarães B and Esperança de Lagos and Ghana Premier League side Liberty Professionals.

== Club career ==
=== Liberty Professionals ===
Zibo started his career with Liberty Professionals in 2016. On 3 April 2016, during his debut, he played the full 90 minutes and scored his debut premier league goal in a 5–1 victory over Ashanti Gold. Latif Blessing scored a brace in that match. During the 2017 season, Zibo had become a key member of the team, starting and playing 21 league matches, whilst playing 13 league matches and scoring 2 goals during the truncated 2018 season. Zibo was appointed as the captain of the side ahead of the 2019 GFA Normalization Committee Special Competition. He played 13 out of the 14 matches played and scored 5 goals to help Liberty to a third-place finish in group B. At the end of the season, he was heavily linked to several clubs in Ghana Premier League including Hearts of Oak, Asante Kotoko and Aduana Stars.

=== Vitória Guimarães B. ===
In 2019, he joined Portuguese side Vitória S.C. B, the reserve team of Vitória Guimarães. He signed a two-year deal with club with an option of a year renewal.

After an unsuccessful spell at Victoria B, Zibo signed for Campeonato de Portugal side Esperança de Lagos on a one-year deal in December 2020. He played 9 matches and scored one goal in his debut season.

=== Malta ===
In October 2025, Zibo joined Mosta.

== Personal life ==
He is the older brother of fellow Ghanaian footballer Kwasi Sibo.

== Honours ==
Birkirkara

- Maltese FA Trophy: 2022–23
