= Steve Borg =

Maltese former footballer

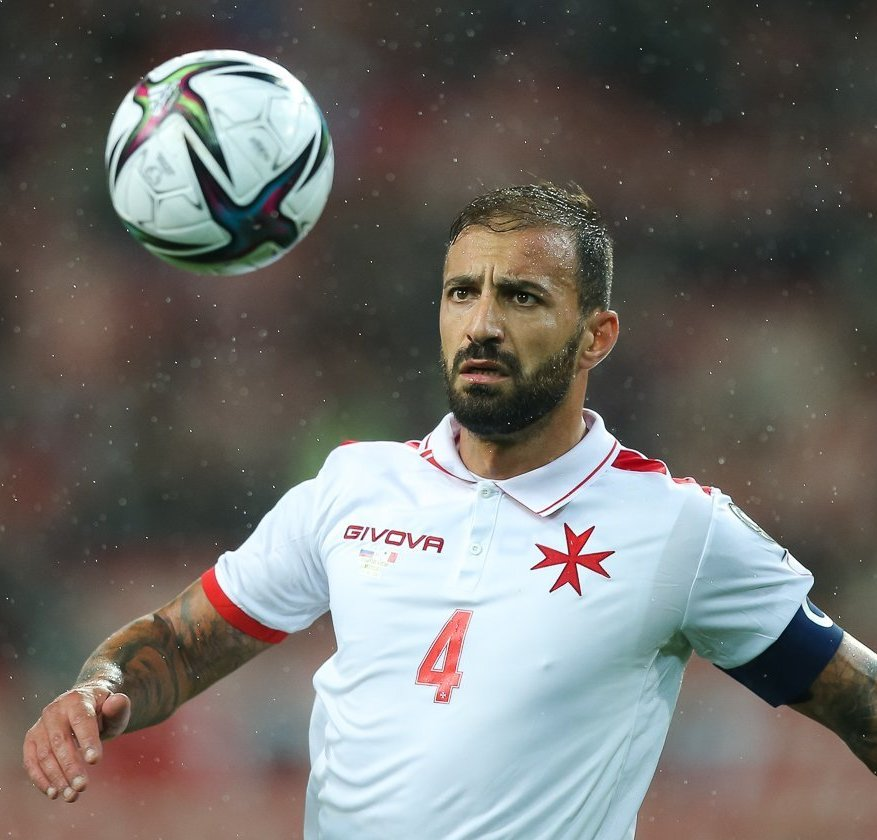
- Borg playing for Malta in 2021

Personal information
- Date of birth: 15 May 1988 (age 38)
- Place of birth: Mosta, Malta
- Position: Centre back

Senior career*
Years	Team	Apps	(Gls)
2005–2009	Mosta		
2009–2015	Valletta	113	(7)
2015–2016	Aris Limassol	28	(1)
2016–2020	Valletta	91	(6)
2020–2022	Gżira United	27	(2)
2022–2025	Ħamrun Spartans	66	(2)
2025–2026	Valletta	26	(0)

International career^{‡}
2011–2025	Malta	82	(3)
- * Club domestic league appearances and goals as of 7 May 2026 ‡ National team caps and goals as of 12 October 2025

Steve Borg (born 15 May 1988) is a Maltese former professional footballer who played as a defender for multiple Maltese Premier League sides and formerly captained the Malta national team.

== Club career ==
=== Mosta ===
In 2005, he signed for local Maltese outfit Mosta. He played there until 2009.

=== Valletta and Aris Limassol ===
In 2009, he signed with Valletta. In six years he won three Maltese Premier League titles (2010–11, 2011–12, 2013–14) and two Maltese FA Cups (2009–10 and 2013–14).

After a short spell in Cyprus with Aris Limassol, he came back to Valletta in 2016, where he spent four more years, winning two more Maltese titles (2017–18 and 2018–19) and another Maltese Cup (2017–18).

=== Gżira United ===
In 2020 he signed a five-year contract with the Maltese Premier League team Gżira United. In the same year he received the Maltese Player of the Year award for his performances with Valletta in the previous season.

=== Ħamrun Spartans and second spell to Valletta ===
Steve Borg warming up for the capital side.

In 2022, Borg joined Ħamrun Spartans. He would later be appointed club captain and he won two league titles (2022-23 and 2023-24) and the Maltese Super Cup (2023). In 2025 he signed a new contract with Valletta.

== Honours ==
=== Valletta ===
- Maltese Premier League: 2010–11, 2011–12, 2013–14, 2017–18, 2018–19
- Maltese Cup: 2009–10, 2013–14, 2017–18
- Maltese Super Cup: 2010, 2011, 2012, 2016, 2018

=== Ħamrun ===
- Maltese Premier League: 2022–23, 2023–24
- Maltese Super Cup: 2023

Individual

- Maltese Player of the Year: 2019–20

== International career ==
In October 2011 he made his debut for the Malta national football team in UEFA Euro 2012 qualifying rounds against Latvia. He scored his first goal for the Malta national football team against Faroe Islands in UEFA Euro 2020 qualification.

=== International goals ===
Scores and results list Malta's goal tally first.

No.	Date	Venue	Opponent	Score	Result	Competition
1.	22 March 2019	Ta' Qali National Stadium, Ta' Qali, Malta	Faroe Islands	2–0	2–1	UEFA Euro 2020 qualification
2.	13 October 2020	Daugava Stadium, Riga, Latvia	Latvia	1-0	1-0	2020–21 UEFA Nations League D
2.	11 November 2020	Ta' Qali National Stadium, Ta' Qali, Malta	Liechtenstein	2-0	3-0	Friendly
