= Giovanni Tedesco =

Italian footballer and manager

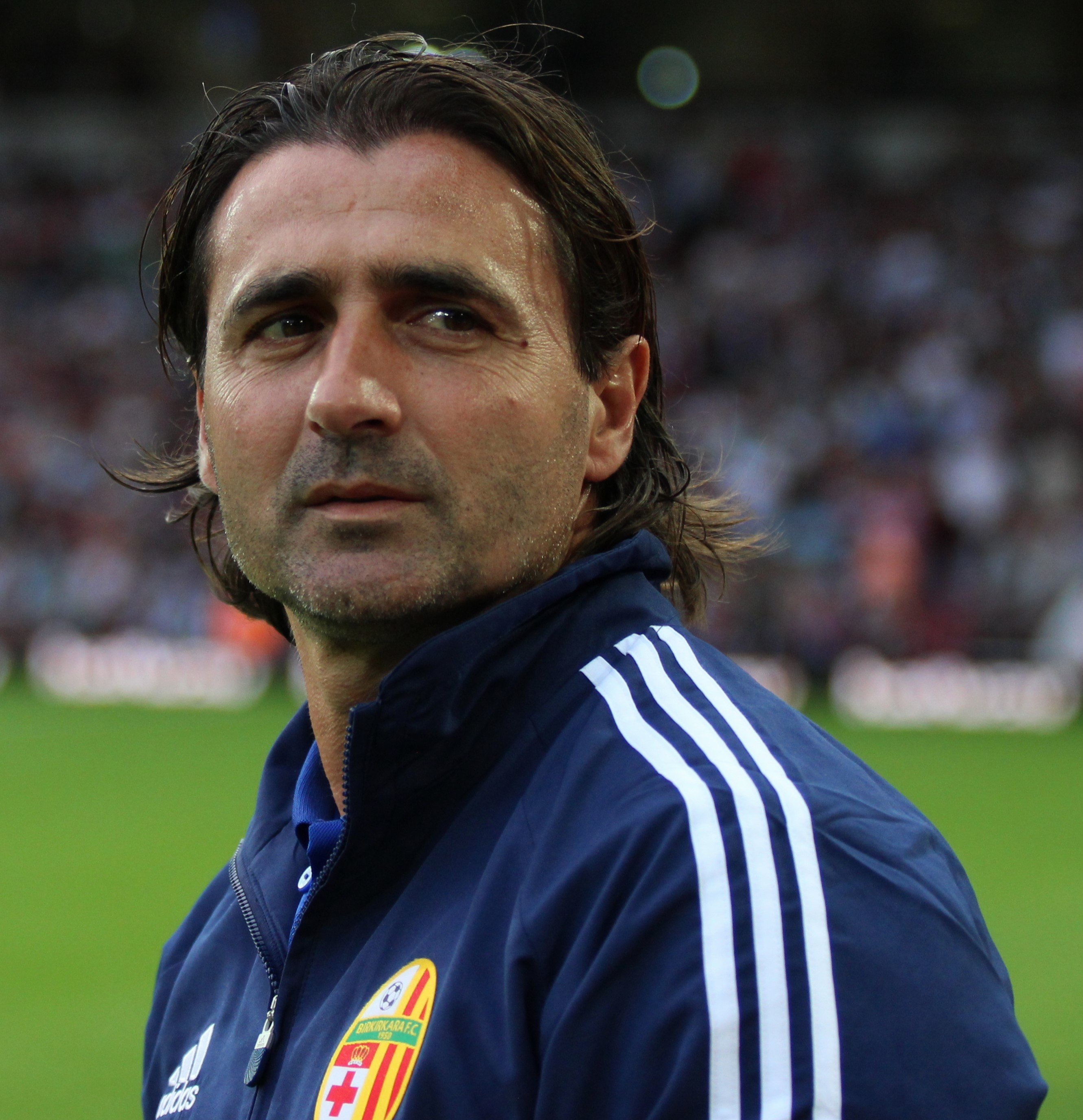
- Tedesco with Birkirkara in July 2015

Personal information
- Date of birth: 13 May 1972 (age 54)
- Place of birth: Palermo, Italy
- Height: 1.70 m (5 ft 7 in)
- Position: Centre midfielder

Senior career*
| Years | Team | Apps | (Gls) |
| 1990–1993 | Reggina | 74 | (6) |
| 1993–1995 | Fiorentina | 47 | (2) |
| 1995–1997 | Foggia | 63 | (5) |
| 1997–1998 | Salernitana | 41 | (3) |
| 1998–2004 | Perugia | 152 | (24) |
| 2004–2006 | Genoa | 77 | (9) |
| 2006–2010 | Palermo | 78 | (9) |

Managerial career
- 2012: Foligno
- 2014–2015: Floriana
- 2015: Birkirkara
- 2016: Palermo
- 2016–2017: Floriana
- 2018–2019: Ħamrun Spartans
- 2019–2020: Gżira United
- 2020: Valletta
- 2020: Al Bataeh
- 2020–2021: Sirens
- 2021: Ras Al Khaimah
- 2022: St. Lucia
- 2022–2023: Birkirkara
- 2024–2025: Gżira United
- 2025–2026: Perugia
- * Club domestic league appearances and goals

Giovanni Tedesco (born 13 May 1972) is an Italian football manager and former player who played as a midfielder.

== Career ==
=== Club career ===
Despite being a native of Palermo, Tedesco was initially refused by the local team, Palermo, because of his thin build, and moved to Reggina. At Reggina, he quickly became a regular in 1990. After three seasons with Reggina (1 in Serie B, 2 in Serie C1), Tedesco moved to Fiorentina in 1993 and helped the team to win the Serie B league. The following season, he then debuted in Serie A in a 2–1 win against Cagliari on 4 September 1994.

Successively, Tedesco has also played for Foggia, Salernitana and Perugia, where he stayed for six seasons as a midfielder, especially during his time with Serse Cosmi as manager.

In January 2004, Tedesco was signed by Genoa of Serie B in an attempt to strengthen the team for the end of the season, which was seeing the rossoblu fighting for the promotion to Serie A. However, Tedesco only settled in with the arrival of Serse Cosmi, his former coach at Perugia, for the following season, who replaced Luigi De Canio, who had not been able to maintain the team in the top table positions. Genoa eventually won Serie B in 2005. However, the club was denied promotion and instead relegated to Serie C1 due to allegations of match-fixing. After relegation to Serie C1, Tedesco chose to stay and played in Genoa for the first half of the 2005–06 season before accepting an offer from Palermo, which he would not have ever refused.

On 8 January 2006, Tedesco played his 500th professional match, a home debut match against Lazio, which the club won 3–1, and he scored the second goal. His contract with Palermo, due to expire in June 2007, was renewed for one more year after the final matchday. He was later stated to have refused offers from several other clubs in order to stay in Palermo and expecting to end his playing career with the rosanero. On 10 April 2008 he agreed terms with Palermo for another one-year extension of his contract with the rosanero.

In 2008–09 he was featured even less, only playing 17 games in his season with the rosanero, many of them in the final part of season. In June 2009, the club announced that it had agreed to a two-year extension for the 37-year-old local hero and Palermo native, who will play with a rosanero jersey until June 2011. However, in the 2009–10 season, he found limited opportunities in the first team, appearing only seven times during the club's Serie A season. In June 2010, Tedesco's retirement from football was confirmed, as well as his appointment as Palermo's new team manager.

=== Coaching career ===
After a few months as team manager of Palermo, Tedesco was moved into the youth coaching staff, initially working alongside youth system chief Rosario Argento as his aide; later, in September 2011, Tedesco took his first coaching job as head of the under-17 Allievi Regionali team for Palermo.

On 26 June 2012, Tedesco amicably parted ways with Palermo to pursue a head coaching career. The next day he was announced as new coach of Lega Pro Seconda Divisione club Foligno, but he was sacked after four matches.

On 6 April 2014, Tedesco was assigned as the new manager for Floriana. He then switched to another Maltese team, Birkirkara, also coaching former Palermo teammate Fabrizio Miccoli.

On 25 January 2016, a few weeks after he departed from Birkirkara, Tedesco was announced as the new head coach of his hometown club Palermo, as the club was searching for a trainer with the required UEFA Pro coaching badges due to newly appointed Guillermo Barros Schelotto's pending issues in that sense. On that sense, Tedesco will officially fill in the role of head coach and hold press conferences till the end of the season, with Schelotto working alongside him as a "team manager" till his bureaucratic issues will not get solved.

On 10 February 2016, following Schelotto's resignation after UEFA's refusal to hand him a valid European coaching authorization, Palermo announced that it had promoted Primavera youth coach Giovanni Bosi as new head coach, with Tedesco as his technical collaborator.

He successively left Palermo in order to return to Floriana as head coach on 15 June 2016.

Further to 2017–18 Maltese FA Trophy defeat against Naxxar Lions, Tedesco resigned with immediate effect as Head Coach of Floriana.

At the end of May 2018, he was appointed as coach of Ħamrun Spartans. After reaching the fourth place in the league, he resigned from his position at the end of the season.

Right after leaving, he signed a new three-years contract with Gżira United. On 18 July 2019, he surprisingly guided Gżira United to eliminate Croatian powerhouse Hajduk Split in the 2019–20 UEFA Europa League first qualifying round by defeating them at home 3–1. On 21 January 2020 Tedesco was sacked by the Maroons, leaving the team at the fourth position in the league.

After just one month, in February 2020, he was appointed as the new manager of Valletta, signing a deal until the end of the season. After just three matches at the helm of the Citizens (due to the end of the season caused by the effects of the COVID-19 pandemic in Malta), in June Tedesco decided not to agree terms with the club for another year, remaining without a team.

In October 2020, he was appointed as a manager of Al Bataeh in the United Arab Emirates, in hoping of getting the new club to promotion. Due to getting infected with COVID-19 virus, however, he stepped down as coach of the new Emirati side around the end of the month, only coaching the team during the preliminary round of the UAE President's Cup.

In December 2020, Tedesco made his return to Malta, signing a one-year contract with the Premier League side Sirens. On 12 April 2021 it was confirmed that Tedesco would leave the club as his contract had expired. In August 2021, Tedesco signed for Emirati club Ras Al Khaimah. A month later, he was forced to part ways with the club after their sporting project floundered due to financial problems.

In January 2022, Tedesco moved back to Malta, signing a contract with Premier League side St. Lucia until the end of the season. After ending the season with St. Lucia, Tedesco was named new head coach of Birkirkara, returning to the club for a second time; he subsequently led the team to win the 2022–23 Maltese FA Trophy. On 26 November 2023 he resigned his with three wins, one draw and four defeat, finishing in tenth place.

On 14 November 2024, Tedesco returned to Gżira United. He departed by the end of the season.

On 22 October 2025, Tedesco returned to Perugia, this time as a head coach for the Serie C club.

== Personal life ==
Giovanni Tedesco has two brothers who are also football coaches and former players: Salvatore (formerly of Perugia, Trapani and Lucchese) and Giacomo, who played at the Serie A level with Salernitana, Napoli, Reggina, Catania and Bologna.

== Honours ==
=== Player ===
Perugia

- UEFA Intertoto Cup: 2003

=== Manager ===
Floriana

- Maltese FA Trophy: 2016–17

Birkirkara

- Maltese FA Trophy: 2022–23
