= Cain Attard =

Maltese footballer

Personal information
- Full name: Cain Attard
- Date of birth: 10 September 1994 (age 32)
- Place of birth: La Valletta, Malta
- Height: 1.77 m (5 ft 9 1/2 in)
- Position: Right-back

Team information
- Current team: Sliema Wanderers
- Number: 22

Youth career
- –2005: Melita F.C.
- 2005–2011: Pietà Hotspurs F.C.

Senior career*
Years	Team	Apps	(Gls)
2011–2015	Pietà Hotspurs F.C.	55	(2)
2015–2023	Birkirkara F.C.	179	(10)
2023–2024	Belenenses	10	(0)
2024–	Sliema Wanderers	17	(1)

International career^{‡}
2014–2016	Malta U21	13	(0)
2016–	Malta	23	(2)
- * Club domestic league appearances and goals as of 18 May 2026 ‡ National team caps and goals as of 26 June 2025

Cain Attard (born 10 September 1994) is a Maltese professional footballer who plays as a right-back for Sliema Wanderers and the Malta national team.

== Club career ==
Attard started his career in Youth Nursery of Melita. At 11, he joined Pietà Hotspurs and in 2011 he started playing in the first team. In August 2015 he signed five-year deal with Birkirkara. On 12 August 2015, he debuted in this club in a match against Hibernians.

On 6 July 2023, Attard signed a one-year contract with Liga Portugal 2 club Belenenses.

== International career ==
He made a debut in Malta national team on 27 May 2016 in a 0–6 loss to Czech Republic.

== International career goals ==
Scores and results list Malta's goal tally first.

No.	Date	Venue	Opponent	Score	Result	Competition
1	1 September 2021	Ta' Qali National Stadium, Malta	Cyprus	1–0	3–0	2022 FIFA World Cup qualification (UEFA)
2	1 September 2021	Ta' Qali National Stadium, Malta	Cyprus	3–0	3–0	2022 FIFA World Cup qualification (UEFA)

== Honours ==
Birkirkara F.C.

- Maltese FA Trophy: 2022-23
