= Enzo Ruiz (Argentine footballer) =

Argentine footballer

Enzo Ruíz
Personal information
- Full name: Enzo Adrián Ruíz
- Date of birth: 20 June 1989 (age 37)
- Place of birth: Rosario, Argentina
- Height: 1.83 m (6 ft 0 in)
- Position: Defender

Team information
- Current team: Gudja United
- Number: 5

Senior career*
| Years | Team | Apps | (Gls) |
| 2009–2012 | Boca Juniors | 11 | (0) |
| 2012–2013 | → Unión Española (loan) | 16 | (0) |
| 2013–2014 | → Gimnasia de Jujuy (loan) | 23 | (1) |
| 2014–2015 | Temperley | 5 | (1) |
| 2016 | Independiente Rivadavia | 9 | (0) |
| 2016–2021 | Floriana | 87 | (6) |
| 2021–2022 | Birkirkara | 18 | (0) |
| 2022– | Valletta | 59 | (0) |
| 2022– | Gudja United | 20 | (1) |
- * Club domestic league appearances and goals as of 21 April 2026

Enzo Adrián Ruíz (born 20 June 1989) is an Argentine football player who plays as a defender for the Maltese side Gudja United.

== Career ==
A product of Boca Juniors, Ruiz was loaned out to Chilean club Unión Española in 2012 and Gimnasia de Jujuy in 2013.

After Boca Juniors, he played for Temperley and Independiente Rivadavia in his homeland.

== Honors ==
=== Player ===
Boca Juniors

- Argentine Primera División (1): 2011 Apertura
- Copa Argentina (1): 2011–12

Unión Española

- Primera División de Chile (1): 2013 Transición
