= Mauricio Mazzetti =

Argentine footballer

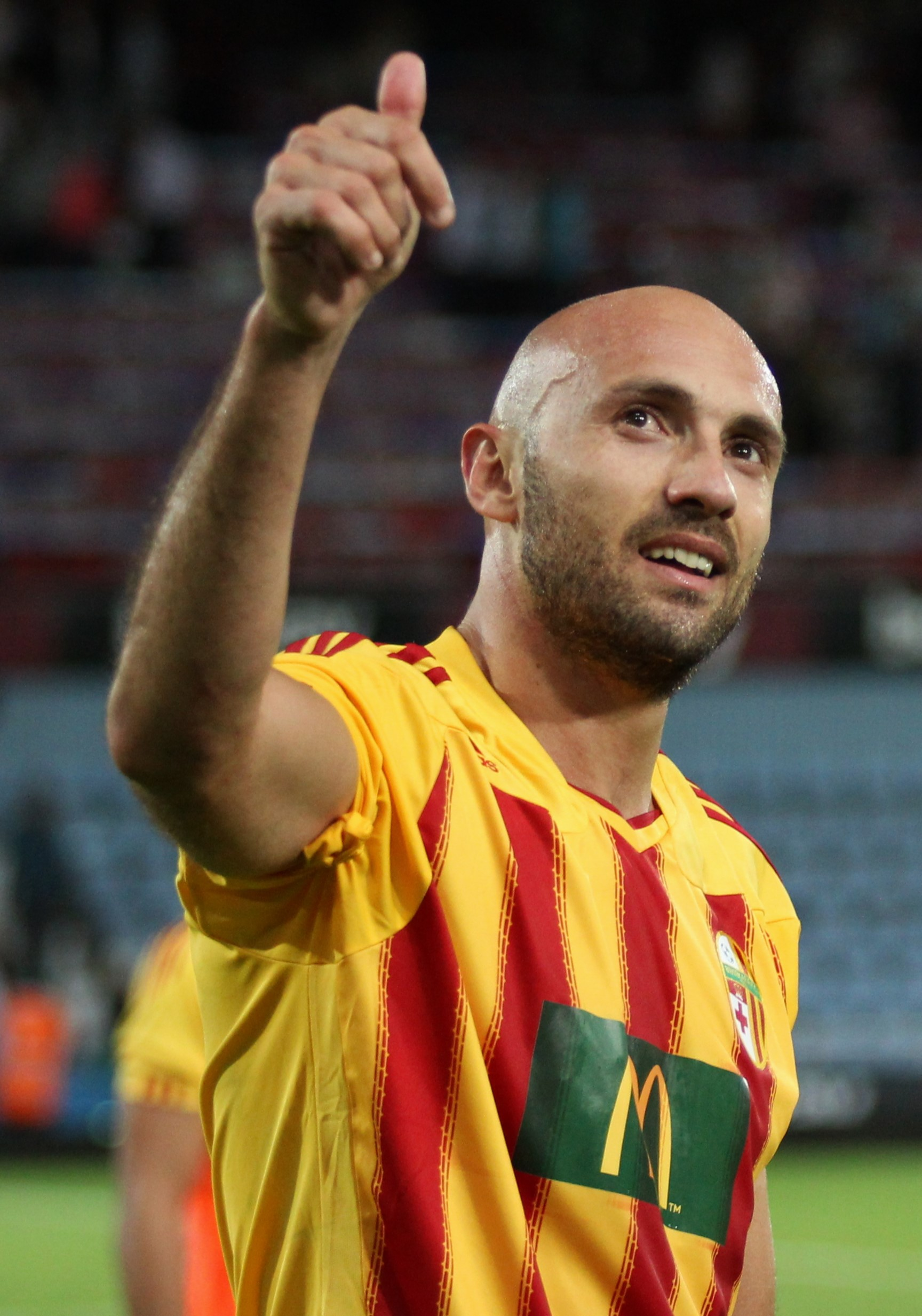
- Mazzetti in 2015

Personal information
- Full name: Mauricio Matias Mazzetti Latini
- Date of birth: June 18, 1986 (age 40)
- Place of birth: Córdoba, Argentina
- Height: 1.87 m (6 ft 2 in)
- Position: Defender

Youth career
- 2000–2001: Talleres de Córdoba

Senior career*
| Years | Team | Apps | (Gls) |
| 2002–2004 | San Lorenzo de Cordoba | 15 | (2) |
| 2004–2008 | Talleres | 10 | (0) |
| 2008–2010 | Racing de Córdoba | 10 | (0) |
| 2010–2011 | Trinidad de San Juan | 24 | (2) |
| 2011–2012 | Gimnasia y Esgrima | 32 | (4) |
| 2012–2013 | FC Emmen | 12 | (1) |
| 2013 | Universitario de Sucre | 14 | (0) |
| 2013–2014 | AEK Kouklia | 5 | (0) |
| 2014 | Duhok SC | 16 | (1) |
| 2014–2015 | Qormi | 15 | (2) |
| 2015–2016 | Birkirkara | 46 | (6) |
| 2016–2017 | Cartaginés | 5 | (0) |
| 2017 | Juan Aurich | 13 | (0) |
- * Club domestic league appearances and goals as of 20 October 2017

Mauricio Mazzetti (born June 18, 1986, in Córdoba, Argentina) is an Argentine football defender.

Mazzetti was first brought to Malta when he joined Qormi after having played with a host of clubs around South America, Europe, and the Middle East. He joined Birkirkara in January 2015, and was a scorer in their 2014–15 FA Cup Trophy win against Hibernians Paola, with the game finishing 2–0.

Mazzetti participated in Birkirkara's Europa League tie against West Ham United F.C. West Ham reportedly showed interest in the defender after his impressive display. After the match West Ham showed interest in Birkirkara's Mauricio Mazzetti, but then club president Adrian Delia commented that no formal offers had been made to Birkirkara.

Mazzetti was later released by Birkirkara in July 2016.

In December 2016, Mazzetti was reported to have joined Terengganu F.C. I, together with fellow Argentine Federico Falcone, a former Valletta F.C. striker in the Maltese Premier League.
