= Tristan Caruana =

Maltese footballer (born 1991)

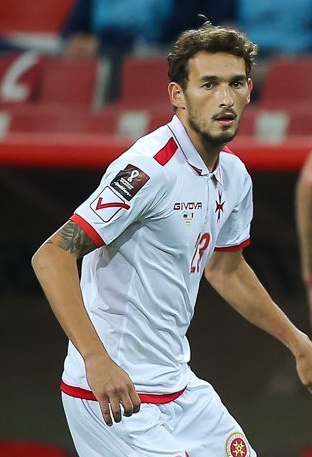
- Caruana playing for Malta in 2021

Personal information
- Date of birth: 15 September 1991 (age 35)
- Place of birth: Marsaskala, Malta
- Height: 1.84 m (6 ft 1/2 in)
- Position: Midfielder

Team information
- Current team: Marsaxlokk
- Number: 23

Senior career*
Years	Team	Apps	(Gls)
2007–2012	Hibernians	62	(7)
2012–2014	Qormi	45	(3)
2014–2017	Tarxien Rainbows	91	(9)
2017–2020	Ħamrun Spartans	62	(3)
2020–2023	Valletta	70	(3)
2023–2025	Balzan	42	(4)
2025–	Marsaxlokk	18	(1)

International career^{‡}
2018–	Malta	11	(1)
- * Club domestic league appearances and goals as of 7 May 2026 ‡ National team caps and goals as of 16 April 2023

Tristan Caruana (born 15 September 1991) is a Maltese professional footballer who plays for Marsaxlokk as a midfielder.

== Career ==
Born in Marsaskala, he has played club football for Hibernians, Qormi, Tarxien Rainbows and Ħamrun Spartans.

He made his international debut for Malta in 2018.

== International goals ==
Scores and results list Malta's goal tally first.

No.	Date	Venue	Opponent	Score	Result	Competition
1.	7 October 2020	National Stadium, Ta' Qali, Malta	Gibraltar	2–0	2–0	Friendly
