= Michael Johnson (footballer, born 1994) =

Maltese footballer

Personal information
- Full name: Michael David Johnson
- Date of birth: 11 May 1994 (age 32)
- Place of birth: Malta
- Position: Defender

Team information
- Current team: St. Andrews
- Number: 32

Senior career*
Years	Team	Apps	(Gls)
2015–2017	St. Andrews	57	(5)
2017–2022	Balzan	75	(6)
2022–2023	St Lucia	10	(0)
2024–	St. Andrews	29	(3)

International career^{‡}
2016	Malta U-21	1	(0)
2018–	Malta	1	(0)
- * Club domestic league appearances and goals as of 21 April 2026 ‡ National team caps and goals as of 30 March 2018

Michael David Johnson (born 11 May 1994) is a Maltese footballer who plays as a defender for St. Andrews in the Maltese Challenge League.

== Club career ==
Johnson joined Balzan on 12 June 2017, after two seasons in the Premier League with St. Andrews.

== International career ==
Johnson was a youth international for the Malta national under-21 football team, making his debut in a 3–2 defeat to the Belgium U-21 on 2 September 2016.

Johnson made his international debut for the Malta senior team in a friendly against Finland on 26 March 2018.
