= Kevin Tulimieri =

Italian footballer

Personal information
- Date of birth: 8 September 1992 (age 34)
- Place of birth: Italy
- Positions: Winger; forward

Team information
- Current team: Gżira United
- Number: 92

Senior career*
Years	Team	Apps	(Gls)
–2012	Gelbison		
2012–2013	Nocerina	0	(0)
2013	Casale	3	(0)
2013–2014	Aversa Normanna	4	(1)
2014–2015	Gelbison		
2016	Potenza		
2016–2017	Savoia		
2017–2018	Sporting Fulgor Molfetta		
2018–2019	Ħamrun Spartans	20	(8)
2019–2022	Valletta	34	(5)
2020-2021	Mosta FC (loan)	19	(3)
2022–2023	Birkirkara	23	(3)
2023–2024	Mosta	22	(3)
2024–	Gżira United	18	(1)
- * Club domestic league appearances and goals as of 26 June 2025

Kevin Tulimieri (born 8 September 1992) is an Italian footballer who plays for Maltese side Gżira United.

== Career ==
Tulimieri started his senior career with A.S.D. Gelbison Cilento Vallo della Lucania. In 2013, he signed for S.F. Aversa Normanna in the Italian Serie C, where he made four league appearances and scored one goal. After that, he played for Potenza Calcio, U.S. Savoia 1908, Sporting Fulgor Molfetta, Ħamrun Spartans, Valletta, Mosta FC where he plays again and Birkirkara FC.

== Honours ==
Birkirkara F.C.

- Maltese FA Trophy: 2022-23
