= Paul Fenech (footballer) =

Maltese footballer

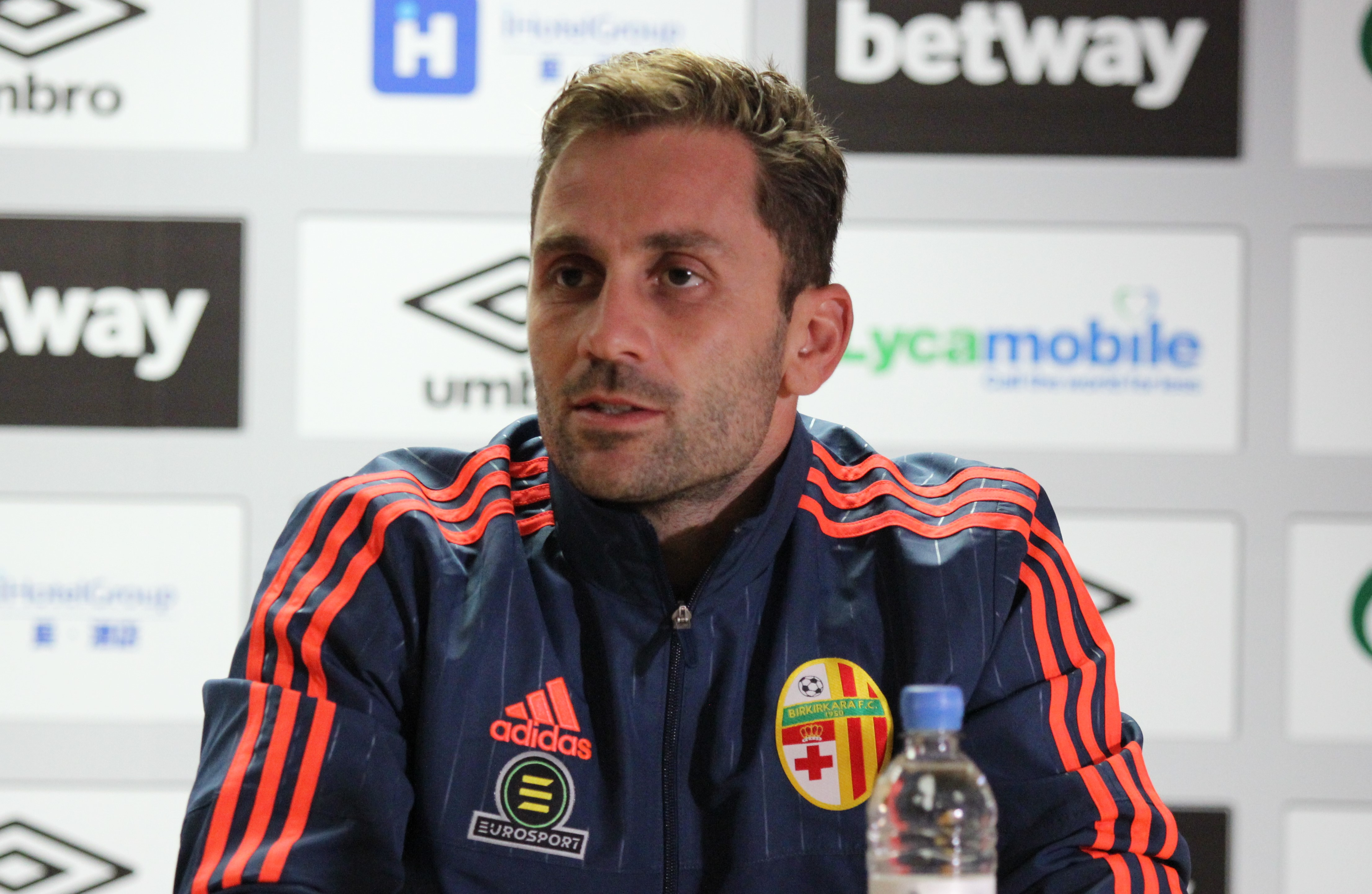

Personal information
- Full name: Paul Fenech
- Date of birth: 20 December 1986 (age 39)
- Place of birth: Naxxar, Malta
- Height: 1.68 m (5 ft 6 in)
- Position: Midfielder

Team information
- Current team: Victoria Hotspurs

Youth career
- Naxxar Lions

Senior career*
Years	Team	Apps	(Gls)
2005–2007	Msida Saint-Joseph	60	(4)
2007–2015	Birkirkara	227	(22)
2016–2018	Balzan	64	(6)
2018	Birkirkara	13	(1)
2019–2024	Balzan	117	(3)
2024–2026	Swieqi United	41	(1)
2026–	Victoria Hotspurs		

International career^{‡}
- Malta U19
- Malta U21
2009–2019	Malta	60	(2)
- * Club domestic league appearances and goals as of 21 April 2026 ‡ National team caps and goals as of 19 November 2019

Paul Fenech (born 20 December 1986) is a Maltese footballer who plays for Maltese Challenge League side Victoria Hotspurs, where he plays as a midfielder.

== Playing career ==
Fenech is a Naxxar Lions product, then moved on to play for Msida Saint-Joseph, with whom he spent two years and, in fact, it was the 'Saints' who gave Fenech the chance to make his debut in the Premier League in 2005.

Fenech spent two successful seasons with Msida Saint-Joseph, during which he was the main target of several clubs in the Maltese Premier League and, finally, it was Birkirkara which managed to sign Fenech for five years. Fenech's experience continued to increase at a national level as he was playing in the Malta national under-21 football team.

During the 2007–08 season, his first season with the 'Stripes', Fenech managed to win his first FA Trophy, thanks to a narrow 2–1 win against Ħamrun Spartans. The 2008–09 season was another successful season for Fenech, as his creativity continued to increase the power of the 'Stripes'.

During the 2009–10 season, Fenech received recognition at a national level once again when he was called by the ex-manager of Birkirkara, John Buttigieg to join the Maltese national team. Fenech won his first Premier League with the 'Stripes' at the age of 23 on 5 May, when his team was presented with the Premier League title. Fenech has played in many Champions League and Europa League qualifying matches with Birkirkara.

Fenech was then transferred from Birkikara to Balzan in 2016 after a falling out with the coach at Birkirkara. Fenech enjoyed many good seasons at Balzan with the team finishing runners up in the Maltese Premier League in the 2017 and 2018 seasons and winning the FA Trophy against Valletta in an exciting final in May 2019.

On 3 July 2026, it was announced that Fenech joined Victoria Hotspurs.

== International career ==
Fenech made his international debut for Malta, and gained his first cap in a friendly on 18 November 2009, in the 4–1 home defeat to Bulgaria.

=== International goals ===
Scores and results list Malta's goal tally first.

No.	Date	Venue	Opponent	Score	Result	Competition
1.	8 June 2015	Ta' Qali National Stadium, Ta' Qali, Malta	Lithuania	1–0	2–0	Friendly
2.	18 November 2019	Ta' Qali National Stadium, Ta' Qali, Malta	Norway	1–1	1–2	UEFA Euro 2020 qualification
