= Bjorn Kristensen (footballer, born 1993) =

Maltese footballer

Personal information
- Date of birth: 5 April 1993 (age 33)
- Place of birth: Marsaxlokk, Malta
- Height: 1.81 m (5 ft 11 in)
- Position: Midfielder

Team information
- Current team: Hibernians
- Number: 11

Youth career
- 2008–2009: Hessel Gods Football School
- 2009–2010: Silkeborg IF

Senior career*
Years	Team	Apps	(Gls)
2010–	Hibernians	380	(31)

International career^{‡}
2012–	Malta	43	(0)
- * Club domestic league appearances and goals as of 18 May 2026 ‡ National team caps and goals as of 17 November 2023

Bjorn Kristensen (also spelt Bjørn Kristensen; born 5 April 1993) is a Maltese professional footballer who plays as a midfielder for Hibernians and the Malta national team.

== Early and personal life ==
Born in Marsaxlokk, Kristensen has a Danish father and Maltese mother. His parents met in Malta and started a family there.

== Club career ==
He played youth football in Denmark with Hessel Gods Football School and Silkeborg IF. Upon his return to Malta, he began playing with Hibernians during the 2010–11 season. In February 2012, he went on trial with English club Everton, and also trialled with German club Werder Bremen.

== International career ==
He made his senior international debut for Malta on 29 February 2012. He had previously played for the Malta under-21 team.
