= Dunstan Vella =

Maltese footballer

Personal information
- Date of birth: 27 April 1996 (age 30)
- Position: Midfielder

Team information
- Current team: Floriana
- Number: 12

Senior career*
Years	Team	Apps	(Gls)
2013–2023	Hibernians	160	(13)
2023–	Floriana	88	(6)

International career^{‡}
2012	Malta U17	1	(0)
2017–2018	Malta U21	10	(0)
2018–	Malta	18	(0)
- * Club domestic league appearances and goals as of 7 May 2026 ‡ National team caps and goals as of 14 November 2024

Dunstan Vella (born 27 April 1996) is a Maltese professional footballer who plays as a midfielder for Floriana.

== Career ==
Vella has played club football for Hibernians.

He made his international debut for Malta in August 2018.
