= Enmy Peña =

Dominican footballer (born 1992)

Personal information
- Full name: Enmy Manuel Peña Beltré
- Date of birth: 7 September 1992 (age 34)
- Place of birth: Azua, Dominican Republic
- Height: 1.79 m (5 ft 10 in)
- Positions: Attacking midfielder; central midfielder; right back

Team information
- Current team: Marsaxlokk
- Number: 24

Senior career*
Years	Team	Apps	(Gls)
2011–2015	Villaverde	100	(12)
2015	Puerta Bonita	11	(0)
2016	St. Andrews	16	(1)
2016	Mosta	1	(0)
2016–2017	St. Andrews	39	(5)
2018–2023	Valletta	113	(7)
2023–2024	Birkirkara	22	(0)
2024–2025	Marsaxlokk	29	(0)

International career^{‡}
2016–	Dominican Republic	15	(2)
- * Club domestic league appearances and goals as of 26 June 2025 ‡ National team caps and goals as of 5 June 2021

Enmy Manuel Peña Beltré (born 7 September 1992) is a Dominican professional footballer who plays for Maltese club Marsaxlokk and the Dominican Republic national team as a midfielder or right back.

== Club career ==
=== St. Andrews F.C. ===
Peña initially joined St. Andrews F.C. from CD Puerta Bonita on 1 January 2016, before moving to Mosta F.C. exactly six months later on 1 July. He rejoined St. Andrews precisely 2 months later on 1 September, scoring one goal in the league since his return.

On 21 September, Peña assisted his side in a 3–0 win over Maltese side Sliema Wanderers with a solo goal where he ran the full length of the pitch and performed a Zidane-turn followed by a nutmeg on two remaining defenders before slotting the ball into the bottom right corner.

=== Valletta ===
In January 2018, Peña joined fellow Maltese club Valletta. He made his league debut for the club on 6 January, coming on as a 71st-minute substitute for Denni in a 1–0 victory over Senglea Athletic. He had to wait ten months for his first goal, scoring late in a 4–1 league victory over Balzan.

=== Birkirkara ===
On 14 June 2023, Peña signed a contract with Birkirkara.

== International career ==
On 10 August 2016, Peña was called up to Dominican Republic national team for two friendlies against Puerto Rico. He made his international debut late in the month, starting in a 5–0 win in an unofficial friendly.

=== International goals ===
Scores and results list Dominican Republic's goal tally first.

No.	Date	Venue	Opponent	Score	Result	Competition
1.	12 October 2018	Estadio Cibao, Santiago de los Caballeros, Dominican Republic	Cayman Islands	3–0	3–0	2019–20 CONCACAF Nations League qualification
2.	24 March 2019	Estadio Cibao, Santiago de los Caballeros, Dominican Republic	Bermuda	1–0	1–3	2019–20 CONCACAF Nations League qualification
