= Rowen Muscat =

Maltese footballer

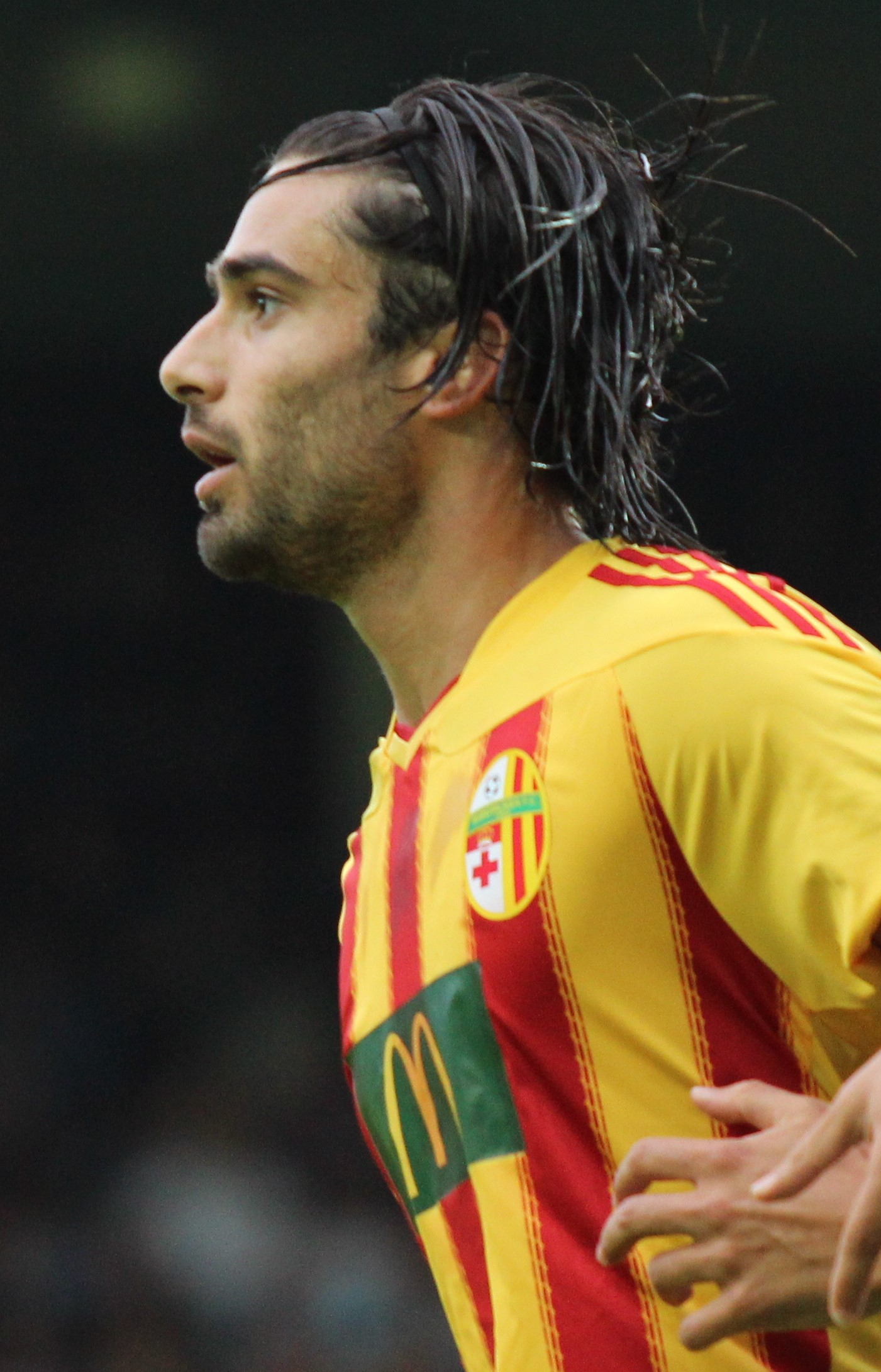
- Muscat with Birkrikara in 2015

Personal information
- Date of birth: 5 June 1991 (age 35)
- Place of birth: Birkirkara, Malta
- Height: 1.80 m (5 ft 11 in)
- Position: Midfielder

Senior career*
Years	Team	Apps	(Gls)
2009–2014	Birkirkara	114	(5)
2014–2015	Dunaújváros	7	(0)
2015–2017	Birkirkara	32	(0)
2016	→ Pavia (loan)	10	(0)
2017–2026	Valletta	114	(2)

International career^{‡}
2012–2021	Malta	50	(1)
- * Club domestic league appearances and goals as of 7 May 2026 ‡ National team caps and goals as of 12:50, 19 November 2019 (UTC)

Rowen Muscat (born 5 June 1991) is a Maltese footballer who plays as a midfielder.

== Club career ==
Muscat began his career with Birkirkara, moving to Hungarian club Dunaújváros. After returning to Birkirkara, he moved to Italian club Pavia on loan in January 2016. He signed for Valletta in January 2017, with Henry Bonello making the move in the opposite direction.

== International career ==
He made his international debut for Malta in the 1–0 win against Liechtenstein played on 14 November 2012. He scored his first goal on 14 October 2018, in a 1–1 draw against Azerbaijan.

=== International goals ===
Scores and results list Malta's goal tally first.

No.	Date	Venue	Opponent	Score	Result	Competition
1.	14 October 2018	Baku Olympic Stadium, Baku, Azerbaijan	Azerbaijan	1–0	1–1	2018–19 UEFA Nations League D
