= Joseph Zerafa =

Maltese footballer

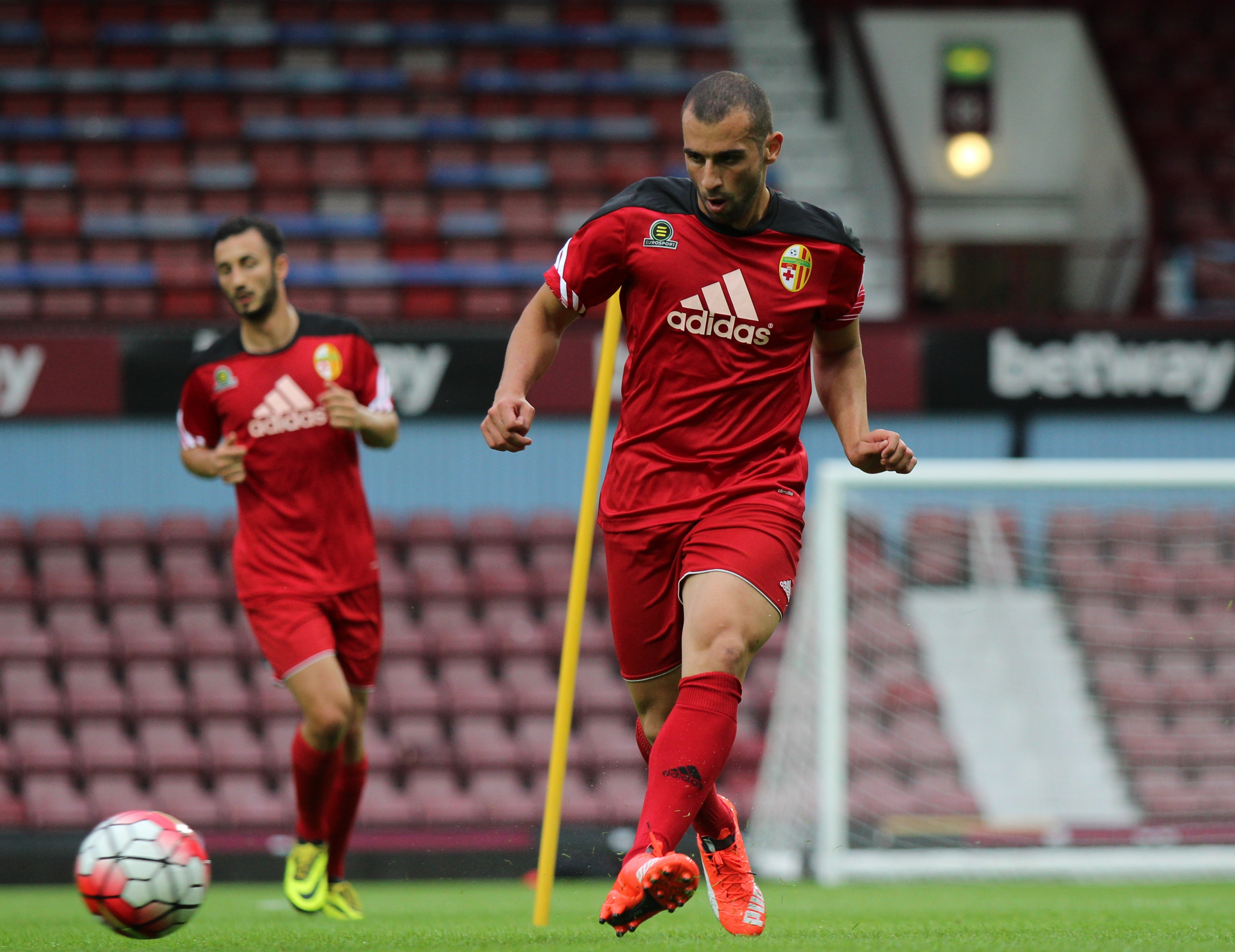
- Joseph Zerafa in 2015

Personal information
- Date of birth: 31 May 1988 (age 38)
- Height: 1.72 m (5 ft 7 1/2 in)
- Position: Left back

Team information
- Current team: Ħamrun Spartans
- Number: 19

Senior career*
Years	Team	Apps	(Gls)
2005–2014	Birkirkara	188	(7)
2014–2015	Grays Athletic	12	(0)
2015	Welling United	0	(0)
2015–2017	Birkirkara	34	(0)
2017–2022	Valletta	78	(0)
2022-2023	Hibernians	21	(0)
2023–	Ħamrun Spartans	0	(0)

International career^{‡}
2011–	Malta	34	(0)
- * Club domestic league appearances and goals as of 18 July 2023 ‡ National team caps and goals as of 12:51, 19 November 2019 (UTC)

Joseph Zerafa (born 31 May 1988) is a Maltese footballer who plays for Ħamrun Spartans as a left back.

== Club career ==
Zerafa has played club football in Malta for Birkirkara. In September 2014, Zerafa joined Isthmian League Premier Division club Grays Athletic in England. He moved to Conference Premier side Welling United in January 2015.

However, Zerafa failed to make an appearance for Welling and returned to Birkirkara in February 2015.

In June 2017 Zerafa signed a five-year deal with Valletta.

== International career ==
He made his international debut for Malta in 2011.
