= Maltese Super Cup =

- Organiser(s): Malta Football Association
- Founded: 1985; 41 years ago
- Region: Malta
- Teams: 2
- Current champions: Hibernians (5th title)
- Most championships: Valletta (14 titles)
- 2026 Maltese Super Cup

The Maltese Super Cup is an annual super cup tie held in Malta between the champions of the previous Maltese Premier League season and the holders of the Maltese FA Trophy. If the Premier League champion also won the FA Trophy, the league runners-up takes its place as the opposition. Up till 2003, the match used to be played at the end of the season, however, this was altered to be played around mid-December.

The current holders are Valletta, who defeated Floriana 2–0 in the final played on the 7th of September.

== Results ==
Year	Winner	Score	Runner-up	Stadium
1985	Rabat Ajax	2–0	Żurrieq	National Stadium, Ta' Qali
1986	Rabat Ajax	4–2	Hibernians	National Stadium, Ta' Qali
1987	Ħamrun Spartans	3–0	Valletta	National Stadium, Ta' Qali
1988	Ħamrun Spartans	1–0 (a.e.t)	Sliema Wanderers	National Stadium, Ta' Qali
1989	Ħamrun Spartans	3–3 (a.e.t) 7–6 (pen.)	Sliema Wanderers	National Stadium, Ta' Qali
1990	Valletta	3–0	Sliema Wanderers	National Stadium, Ta' Qali
1991	Ħamrun Spartans	1–1 (a.e.t) 6–5 (pen.)	Valletta	National Stadium, Ta' Qali
1992	Ħamrun Spartans	2–0	Valletta	National Stadium, Ta' Qali
1993	Floriana	4–1	Valletta	National Stadium, Ta' Qali
1994	Hibernians	2–2 (a.e.t) 5–4 (pen.)	Floriana	National Stadium, Ta' Qali
1995	Valletta	2–2 (a.e.t) 6–5 (pen.)	Hibernians	National Stadium, Ta' Qali
1996	Sliema Wanderers	0–0 (a.e.t) 3–2 (pen.)	Valletta	National Stadium, Ta' Qali
1997	Valletta	5–2	Birkirkara	National Stadium, Ta' Qali
1998	Valletta	2–0	Hibernians	National Stadium, Ta' Qali
1999	Valletta	2–1	Birkirkara	National Stadium, Ta' Qali
2000	Sliema Wanderers	3–0	Birkirkara	National Stadium, Ta' Qali
2001	Valletta	2–1	Sliema Wanderers	National Stadium, Ta' Qali
2002	Birkirkara	1–0 (a.e.t)	Hibernians	National Stadium, Ta' Qali
2003	Birkirkara	2–0	Sliema Wanderers	National Stadium, Ta' Qali
2004	Birkirkara	3–1 (a.e.t)	Sliema Wanderers	National Stadium, Ta' Qali
2005	Birkirkara	3–0	Sliema Wanderers	National Stadium, Ta' Qali
2006	Birkirkara	2–1	Hibernians	National Stadium, Ta' Qali
2007	Hibernians	3–1	Marsaxlokk	National Stadium, Ta' Qali
2008	Valletta	2–0	Birkirkara	National Stadium, Ta' Qali
2009	Sliema Wanderers	1–0	Hibernians	National Stadium, Ta' Qali
2010	Valletta	3–2 (a.e.t)	Birkirkara	National Stadium, Ta' Qali
2011	Valletta	3–0	Floriana	National Stadium, Ta' Qali
2012	Valletta	3–1	Hibernians	National Stadium, Ta' Qali
2013	Birkirkara	3–2	Hibernians	National Stadium, Ta' Qali
2014	Birkirkara	2–1	Valletta	National Stadium, Ta' Qali
2015	Hibernians	2–1	Birkirkara	National Stadium, Ta' Qali
2016	Valletta	2–1	Sliema Wanderers	National Stadium, Ta' Qali
2017	Floriana	1–0	Hibernians	National Stadium, Ta' Qali
2018	Valletta	2–1	Balzan	National Stadium, Ta' Qali
2019	Valletta	2–1	Balzan	National Stadium, Ta' Qali
2020	Not held			
2021	Not held			
2022	Hibernians	0–0 (a.e.t) 5–4 (pen.)	Floriana	Gozo Stadium, Xewkija
2023	Ħamrun Spartans	4–0	Birkirkara	National Stadium, Ta' Qali
2024	Ħamrun Spartans	2–0	Sliema Wanderers	National Stadium, Ta' Qali
2025	Hibernians	2–1 (a.e.t)	Ħamrun Spartans	National Stadium, Ta' Qali
2026	Valletta	2–0	Floriana	National Stadium, Ta' Qali

== Results by club ==
Club	Wins	Last final won	Runners-up	Last final lost	Total appearances
Valletta	14	2026	6	2014	20
Birkirkara	7	2014	7	2023	14
Ħamrun Spartans	7	2024	1	2025	8
Hibernians	5	2025	9	2017	14
Sliema Wanderers	3	2009	9	2024	12
Floriana	2	2017	4	2026	6
Rabat Ajax	2	1986	—	—	2
Balzan	—	—	2	2019	2
Żurrieq	—	—	1	1985	1
Marsaxlokk	—	—	1	2004	1
