= 2016–17 Valletta F.C. season =

Maltese football team season

Valletta
2016–17 season
- Manager: Paul Zammit
- Premier League: 4th
- UEFA Champions League: Second Qualifying Round
- FA Trophy: Fourth Round
- Super Cup: Winners
- Top goalscorer: League: Maximiliano Velasco (9); All: Maximiliano Velasco (9)

The 2016–17 season saw Valletta finish fourth in the Maltese Premier League, whilst winning the Maltese Super Cup. They were knocked out of the Maltese FA Trophy in the fourth round with a defeat to Balzan and eliminated in the second qualifying round of the UEFA Champions League.

== UEFA Champions League ==
=== First qualifying round ===
28 June 2016 1st leg	Valletta (Malta)	1–0	B36 Tórshavn (Faroe Islands)	Paola, Malta
	Falcone 69'; Aguirre (yellow card) 72'	Report	Bogason Dam (yellow card) 7'	Stadium: Hibernians Stadium; Attendance: 1,151; Referee: Radu Petrescu (Romania)

5 July 2016 2nd leg	B36 Tórshavn (Faroe Islands)	2–1	Valletta (Malta)	Tórshavn, Faroe Islands
	Thorleifsson 11'; Næs (yellow card) 56'; H. Agnarsson 66', (yellow card) 67'; Færø (yellow card) 74'	Report	Falcone 24'; Bonello (yellow card) 67'; Pani (yellow card) 68'	Stadium: Gundadalur; Attendance: 850; Referee: Roomer Tarajev (Estonia)

2–2 on aggregate; Valletta won on away goals.

=== Second qualifying round ===
12 July 2016 1st leg	Valletta (Malta)	1–2	Crvena Zvezda (Serbia)	Paola, Malta
	Falcone 15'; Romeu (yellow card) 28'; Pani (yellow card) 81'	Report	Hugo Vieira (yellow card) 11'; Katai (yellow card) 53', (goal) 66'; Sikimić 75'; Kanga (yellow card) 84'	Stadium: Hibernians Stadium; Attendance: 1,098; Referee: Alexander Harkam (Austria)

19 July 2016 2nd leg	Crvena Zvezda (Serbia)	2–1	Valletta (Malta)	Belgrade, Serbia
	Donald (yellow card) 12', (goal) 30'; Katai 76'; Sikimić (yellow card) 83'	Report	Caruana 11'; Briffa (yellow card) 51'; S. Borg (yellow card) 60'; Cremona (yellow card) 54'	Stadium: Rajko Mitić Stadium; Attendance: 31,112; Referee: Tore Hansen (Norway)

Crvena Zvezda won 4–2 on aggregate.

== Pre-season - Evolution Gaming Summer Cup ==
Valletta took part in the fourth edition of the annual St. Andrews Summer Cup for the second year running. Having won the pre-season competition in 2015, they finished runners-up this time round with a 2-0 loss to Sliema Wanderers in the final.

=== Group Stage ===
Match	Date	Opponent	Venue	Result	Scorers	Report
1	27 July 2016	St. Andrews	Luxol Stadium	2–0	Jhonnattann, J. Borg	Report
2	29 July 2016	Mosta	Luxol Stadium	3–0	Umeh, Mifsud, Briffa	Report

==== Section A ====
Pos	Team	Pld	W	D	L	GF	GA	GD	Pts
1	Valletta (Q)	2	2	0	0	5	0	+5	6
2	St. Andrews (Q)	2	0	1	1	1	3	−2	1
3	Mosta	2	0	1	1	1	4	−3	1

(Q) Qualified for the phase indicated

==== Section B ====
Pos	Team	Pld	W	D	L	GF	GA	GD	Pts
1	Sliema Wanderers (Q)	2	2	0	0	3	1	+2	6
2	Pembroke Athleta (Q)	2	1	0	1	4	3	+1	3
3	Sirens	2	0	0	2	1	4	−3	0

(Q) Qualified for the phase indicated

=== Knockout Phase ===
Match	Date	Opponent	Venue	Result	Scorers	Report
Semi-final	31 July 2016	Pembroke Athleta	Luxol Stadium	3–0	S. Borg 39', Mifsud 55', Jhonnattann 65'	Report
Final	7 August 2016	Sliema Wanderers	Luxol Stadium	0–2		Report

== BOV Premier League ==
=== Results ===
Match	Date	Opponent	Venue	Result	Attendance	Scorers	Report
1	19 August 2016	Sliema Wanderers	Victor Tedesco Stadium	2–1	919	Cremona 9', Briffa 83'	Report
2	26 August 2016	Mosta	Hibernians Stadium	1–0		Jhonnattann 56'(pen)	Report
3	10 September 2016	Pembroke Athleta	National Stadium	5–1	979	Falcone (2) 8', 41', Romeu 48', Azzopardi 76', Jhonnattann 78'	Report
4	17 September 2016	Balzan	National Stadium	2–2	1,087	Aguirre 16', Umeh 45+1'	Report
5	21 September 2016	Floriana	National Stadium	0–2	2,470		Report
6	25 September 2016	Hibernians	National Stadium	0–2	1,168		Report
7	30 September 2016	Birkirkara	National Stadium	1–1	1,794	Jhonnattann 66'	Report
8	15 October 2016	Gżira United	Victor Tedesco Stadium	3–1	765	Jhonnattann 7', Falcone 25' (pen), J. Borg 90+4'	Report
9	22 October 2016	Tarxien Rainbows	Hibernians Stadium	1–0	943	Mifsud 75'	Report
10	28 October 2016	St. Andrews	Victor Tedesco Stadium	0–0	637		Report
11	5 November 2016	Ħamrun Spartans	National Stadium	3–0	3,201	Jhonnattann (2) 45+1' (pen), 90+1', Aguirre 76'	Report
12	19 November 2016	Sliema Wanderers	National Stadium	2–1	640	Falcone 61', Cremona 69'	Report
13	27 November 2016	Mosta	Victor Tedesco Stadium	0–0	711		Report
14	3 December 2016	Pembroke Athleta	Victor Tedesco Stadium	3–0	540	Mifsud 15', Malano 76', Aguirre 82'	Report
15	11 December 2016	Balzan	National Stadium	2–2	1,269	Falcone 47', Jhonnattann 75'	Report
16	17 December 2016	Floriana	National Stadium	0–0	1,419		Report
17	8 January 2017	Hibernians	National Stadium	0–1			Report
18	14 January 2017	Gżira United	Hibernians Stadium	1–0	602	Montebello 58'	Report
19	21 January 2017	Birkirkara	National Stadium	1–0	1,228	Malano 27'	Report
20	28 January 2017	St. Andrews	Victor Tedesco Stadium	1–1	674	Radzinevičius 32'	Report
21	5 February 2017	Tarxien Rainbows	National Stadium	1–1	1,144	Aguirre 90'	Report
22	12 February 2017	Ħamrun Spartans	National Stadium	2–0	1,932	Umeh 59', Malano 73'	Report
23	24 February 2017	Sliema Wanderers	National Stadium	3–1	669	Velasco (2) 64', 66', Umeh 79'	Report
24	5 March 2017	Mosta	National Stadium	4–0	680	Velasco (2) 37', 68', Montebello (2) 43', 83'	Report
25	11 March 2017	Pembroke Athleta	National Stadium	4–0		Montebello 26', Velasco 56', Umeh 73', Mifsud 83'	Report
26	17 March 2017	Balzan	National Stadium	1–0	1,360	Romeu 20'	Report
27	2 April 2017	Floriana	National Stadium	1–1	4,510	Mifsud 82'	Report
28	5 April 2017	Hibernians	National Stadium	1–0	2,371	S. Borg 90'	Report
29	8 April 2017	Gżira United	National Stadium	1–1		Montbello 27'	Report
30	15 April 2017	Birkirkara	National Stadium	3–3	1,483	Malano 8', Velasco (2) 4', 80'	Report
31	22 April 2017	St. Andrews	National Stadium	1–3	490	Velasco 74'	Report
32	29 April 2017	Tarxien Rainbows	National Stadium	0–2			Report
33	5 May 2017	Ħamrun Spartans	National Stadium	1–2	595	Velasco 65'	Report

=== League table ===
Pos	Team	Pld	W	D	L	GF	GA	GD	Pts	Qualification or relegation
1	Hibernians (C)	33	22	5	6	64	31	+33	71	Qualification for the 2017–18 UEFA Champions League
2	Balzan	33	19	7	7	66	40	+26	64	Qualification for the 2017–18 UEFA Europa League
3	Birkirkara (Note: Birkirkara would have qualified for the Europa League first qualifying round, but failed to obtain a UEFA licence.)	33	18	8	7	64	30	+34	62	
4	Valletta	33	16	11	6	51	29	+22	59	Qualification for the 2017–18 UEFA Europa League
5	Floriana (Note: Floriana qualified for the 2017–18 UEFA Europa League by winning the 2016–17 Maltese FA Trophy.)	33	15	9	9	51	37	+14	54	Qualification for the 2017–18 UEFA Europa League
6	Sliema Wanderers	33	15	7	11	47	37	+10	52	
7	Gżira United	33	10	7	16	43	51	−8	37	
8	St. Andrews	33	9	10	14	45	51	−6	37	
9	Tarxien Rainbows	33	8	11	14	38	48	−10	35	
10	Hamrun Spartans	33	9	6	18	44	61	−17	33	
11	Mosta (Note: Mosta were deducted five points for making illegal payments to a player registered as an amateur.) (O)	33	7	5	21	29	71	−42	21	Qualification for the Relegation Play-Offs
12	Pembroke Athleta (R)	33	4	6	23	28	84	−56	18	Relegation to the 2017–18 Maltese First Division

Source: Malta Football Association, Soccerway
Rules for classification: 1) Points; 2) Play-offs (only if needed to decide champions, teams for relegation or teams for UEFA competitions).
(C) Champions; (O) Play-off winners; (R) Relegated

== FA Trophy ==
Round	Date	Opponent	Venue	Result	Scorers	Report
R3	14 December 2016	San Ġwann	Victor Tedesco Stadium	1–0	Umeh 40'	Report
R4	18 January 2017	Balzan	National Stadium	0–1		Report

== BOV Super Cup ==
Date	Opponent	Venue	Result	Attendance	Scorers	Report
21 December 2016	Sliema Wanderers	National Stadium	2–1	1,430	S. Borg 35', Umeh 45'	Report

== Squad statistics ==
=== First Team ===
No.	Pos.	Name	BOV Premier League		The FA Trophy		UEFA Champions League		BOV Super Cup		Total		Discipline	
No.	Pos.	Name	Apps	Goals	Apps	Goals	Apps	Goals	Apps	Goals	Apps	Goals	Yellow card	Red card
1	GK	(Malta) Henry Bonello	7	0	0	0	3	0	0	0	10	0	1	1
2	DF	(Malta) Jonathan Caruana	28	0	0	0	4	1	1	0	33	1	4	0
3	DF	(Malta) Ian Azzopardi	2(3)	1	0	0	4	0	0	0	6(3)	1	1	0
4	DF	(Malta) Steve Borg	27	1	1	0	2	0	1	1	31	2	9	1
5	DF	(Malta) Ryan Camilleri	25(1)	0	2	0	0	0	1	0	28(1)	0	3	0
6	DF	(Argentina) Juan Cruz Gill	6(1)	0	2	0	4	0	0	0	12(1)	0	3	0
6	DF	(Malta) Jake Borg	0	0	0	0	0	0	0	0	0	0	0	0
8	FW	(Argentina) Santiago Malano	26(2)	4	1	0	1(3)	0	0	0	28(5)	4	1	0
9	FW	(Malta) Michael Mifsud	13(10)	4	0	0	1(2)	0	1	0	15(12)	4	3	0
10	MF	(Malta) Roderick Briffa	5(4)	1	0	0	4	0	0	0	9(4)	1	1	0
11	FW	(Malta) Luke Montebello	9(10)	5	1(1)	0	0	0	0(1)	0	10(12)	5	2	0
13	GK	(Malta) Nicky Vella	1	0	0	0	0	0	0	0	1	0	0	0
15	FW	(Malta) Russell Fenech	0(7)	0	0(1)	0	0	0	0	0	0(8)	0	0	0
16	DF	(Malta) Jean Borg	16(12)	1	2	0	0(2)	0	0(1)	0	18(15)	1	0	0
16	DF	(Malta) Paul Chircop	0	0	0	0	0	0	0	0	0	0	0	0
18	MF	(Malta) Jurgen Suda	0(3)	0	1	0	0	0	0	0	1(3)	0	0	0
18	MF	(Malta) Shaun Dimech	0(2)	0	0	0	0	0	0	0	0(2)	0	0	0
18	MF	(Malta) Jeremy Micallef	0	0	0	0	0	0	0	0	0	0	0	0
19	MF	(Namibia) Ennio Hamutenya	0	0	0	0	0	0	0	0	0	0	0	0
20	FW	(Argentina) Federico Falcone	12	5	0	0	3	3	0	0	15	8	4	0
20	FW	(Lithuania) Tomas Radzinevičius	4(1)	1	1	0	0	0	0	0	5(1)	1	0	0
20	MF	(Malta) Matthew Spiteri	0	0	0	0	0	0	0	0	0	0	0	0
20	DF	(Malta) Leon Camilleri	0	0	0	0	0	0	0	0	0	0	0	0
21	MF	(Malta) Llywelyn Cremona	11(18)	2	0(2)	0	1(3)	0	1	0	13(23)	2	4	0
22	MF	(Malta) Nicholas Pulis	0(3)	0	0(1)	0	0	0	0	0	0(4)	0	0	0
23	MF	(Italy) Claudio Pani	26	0	2	0	4	0	1	0	33	0	13	1
23	FW	(Malta) Kenny Spagnol	0	0	0	0	0	0	0	0	0	0	0	0
24	MF	(Nigeria) Uchenna Umeh	19(4)	4	1	1	0(2)	0	1	1	21(6)	6	6	2
25	DF	(Argentina) Leandro Aguirre	30	4	2	0	4	0	1	0	37	4	6	1
26	GK	(Malta) Manuel Bartolo	0	0	0	0	1	0	0	0	1	0	0	0
27	MF	(Brazil) Jhonnattann	18	7	0	0	4	0	1	0	23	7	1	0
27	FW	(Argentina) Maximiliano Velasco	10(1)	9	0	0	0	0	0	0	10(1)	9	1	0
29	GK	(Malta) Maverick Buhagiar	0(1)	0	0	0	0	0	0	0	0(1)	0	0	0
29	GK	(Lithuania) Dziugas Bartkus	25	0	2	0	0	0	1	0	29	0	2	0
42	MF	(Malta) Rowen Muscat	7	0	1	0	0	0	0	0	8	0	2	1
84	MF	(Angola) Valdo Alhinho	16	0	1	0	0	0	1	0	18	0	5	0
90	DF	(Brazil) Romeu	20(6)	2	2	0	4	0	0(1)	0	26(7)	2	4	0

== Transfers ==
=== In ===
Date	Pos.	Name	From	Fee	Ref.
3 June 2016	DF	(Argentina) Leandro Aguirre	(Argentina) Independiente Rivadavia	Free	
6 June 2016	DF	(Malta) Steve Borg	(Cyprus) Aris Limassol	Free	
18 June 2016	FW	(Argentina) Santiago Malano	(Chile) Rangers de Talca	Free	
11 July 2016	GK	(Lithuania) Dziugas Bartkus	(Poland) Górnik Łęczna	Free	
28 September 2016	MF	(Angola) Valdo Alhinho	(Portugal) Oriental	Free	
3 January 2017	FW	(Lithuania) Tomas Radzinevičius	(Lithuania) FK Sūduva	Free	
6 January 2017	MF	(Malta) Rowen Muscat	(Malta) Birkirkara	Free	
12 January 2017	FW	(Argentina) Maximiliano Velasco	(Peru) Deportivo Municipal	Free	

=== Out ===
Date	Pos.	Name	To	Fee	Ref.
11 June 2016	MF	(Brazil) Rafael Ledesma	(Malta) Gżira United	Free	
10 July 2016	DF	(Malta) Mirco Vella	(Malta) Lija Athletic	Free	
19 July 2016	FW	(Malta) Jean Pierre Mifsud Triganza	(Malta) Ħamrun Spartans	Free	
22 July 2016	MF	(Malta) Dyson Falzon	(Malta) Gżira United	Free	
10 August 2016	GK	(Malta) Manuel Bartolo	(Malta) Mosta	Free	
10 August 2016	MF	(Malta) Kurt Magro	(Malta) Mosta	Free	
16 August 2016	MF	(Malta) Siraj Arab	(Malta) Pembroke Athleta	Free	
26 December 2016	FW	(Argentina) Federico Falcone	(Malaysia) Terengganu	Free	
6 January 2017	GK	(Malta) Henry Bonello	(Malta) Birkirkara	Free	
31 May 2017	MF	(Angola) Valdo Alhinho	Unattached	Released	

=== Loan out ===
Date from	Date to	Pos.	Name	To	Ref.
1 July 2016	31 May 2017	DF	(Malta) Miguel Attard	(Malta) Pembroke Athleta	
6 July 2016	19 January 2017	DF	(Malta) Kieron Grima	(Malta) Żebbuġ Rangers	
11 July 2016	9 December 2016	FW	(Malta) Luke Montebello	(Malta) Pembroke Athleta	
15 July 2016	31 May 2017	FW	(Malta) Terence Scerri	(Malta) Kalkara	
1 August 2016	31 May 2017	MF	(Malta) Bjorn Bondin	(Malta) Qrendi	
1 August 2016	15 December 2016	DF	(Malta) Daniel Camilleri	(Malta) St. Andrews	
1 August 2016	31 May 2017	DF	(Malta) Fabio Muscat	(Malta) Msida St. Joseph	
1 August 2016	31 May 2017	MF	(Malta) Dasser Sammut	(Malta) Qrendi	
1 August 2016	31 May 2017	MF	(Malta) Dario Tabone	(Malta) Żebbuġ Rangers	
1 August 2016	31 May 2017	DF	(Malta) Dean Grech	(Malta) Swieqi United	
2 August 2016	31 May 2017	MF	(Malta) Brandon Grech	(Malta) Qormi	
19 August 2016	15 January 2017	MF	(Malta) Cleavon Frendo	(Malta) Attard	
15 December 2016	31 May 2017	DF	(Malta) Ian Azzopardi	(Malta) Gżira United	
15 December 2016	31 May 2017	MF	(Malta) Jurgen Suda	(Malta) Pietà Hotspurs	
15 December 2016	31 May 2017	FW	(Malta) Kurt Borg	(Malta) Żabbar St. Patrick	
10 January 2017	31 May 2017	DF	(Malta) Daniel Camilleri	(Malta) Għargħur	
15 January 2017	31 May 2017	MF	(Brazil) Jhonnattann	(Saudi Arabia) Al-Batin	
18 January 2017	31 May 2017	MF	(Malta) Cleavon Frendo	(Malta) Fgura United	
