= 2015–16 Valletta F.C. season =

Maltese football team season

Valletta
2015–16 season
- Manager: Paul Zammit
- Premier League: 1st
- FA Trophy: Fourth Round
- UEFA Europa League: First Qualifying Round
- Top goalscorer: League: Federico Falcone (16); All: Federico Falcone (16)

The 2015–16 season was Valletta's twenty-third title-winning season in the Maltese Premier League. They were knocked out of the Maltese FA Trophy in the fourth round with a defeat to Birkirkara and eliminated in the first qualifying round of the UEFA Europa League with a 4-2 aggregate defeat to Newtown. On the way to their league title they managed an impressive ten-game winning streak, which concluded with a run of just one loss in 23 matches.

== Pre-season - Summer Friendship Cup ==
=== Group Stage ===
Match	Date	Opponent	Venue	Result	Scorers	Report
1	29 July 2015	Tarxien Rainbows	Luxol Stadium	5–0	Jhonnattann (2) 15', 43', Mifsud Triganza 25', Pani 58' (pen), Borg 77'	Report
2	1 August 2015	Melita	Luxol Stadium	4–0	Umeh 10', Priso (2) 15', 90', Mifsud Triganza 23'	Report
3	6 August 2015	Gżira United	Luxol Stadium	1–0	Priso 53'	Report

==== Group A ====
Pos	Team	Pld	W	D	L	GF	GA	GD	Pts
1	Valletta (Q)	3	3	0	0	10	0	+10	9
2	Tarxien Rainbows (Q)	3	2	0	1	4	6	−2	6
3	Melita	3	1	0	2	2	6	−4	3
4	Gżira United	3	0	0	3	1	5	−4	0

(Q) Qualified for the phase indicated

=== Knockout Phase ===
Match	Date	Opponent	Venue	Result	Scorers	Report
Semi-final	11 August 2015	Senglea Athletic	Luxol Stadium	6–0	Priso 12', Romeu 18', Montebello (2) 25', 42', Briffa, Bajada	Report
Final	14 August 2015	Sliema Wanderers	Luxol Stadium	2–0	Mifsud Triganza 59', Montebello 82'	Report

== UEFA Europa League ==
=== First qualifying round ===
2 July 2015 1st leg	Newtown (Wales)	2–1	Valletta (Malta)	Newtown, Wales
	Goodwin (yellow card) 36'; Boundford 40'; Mitchell (yellow card) 46'; Williams (yellow card) 61'; Oswell 90+1'; Price (yellow card) 90+5'	Report	Cremona (yellow card) 33'; Azzopardi (yellow card) 40' (yellow-red card) 85'; Jhonnattann 73'; Gill (yellow card) 76'	Stadium: Latham Park; Attendance: 1,420; Referee: Vladimir Vnuk (Slovakia)

9 July 2015 2nd leg	Valletta (Malta)	1–2	Newtown (Wales)	Paola, Malta
	Fidjeu 46'; Nafti (yellow card) 67'; R. Camilleri (red card) 74'; Gill (yellow card) 83'; Briffa (yellow card) 84'	Report	Oswell 7'; Boundford (yellow card) 39'; Mills-Evans (yellow card) 57'; D. Jones (yellow card) 81'; Cook (yellow card) 84' (yellow-red card) 87'; Owen (penalty missed) 85', 85'; Price (yellow card) 90+5'	Stadium: Hibernians Stadium; Attendance: 1,914; Referee: Mihály Fábián (Hungary)

Newtown won 4–2 on aggregate.

== BOV Premier League ==
=== First phase ===
==== Results ====
Match	Date	Opponent	Venue	Result	Attendance	Scorers	Report
1	21 August 2015	St. Andrews	Victor Tedesco Stadium	3–0	1,057	Priso (2) 45' (pen), 67' (pen), Falcone 89'	Report
2	28 August 2015	Sliema Wanderers	National Stadium	1–0	1,425	Falcone 89'	Report
3	13 September 2015	Birkirkara	National Stadium	2–1	2,883	Falcone 44', Priso 86'	Report
4	19 September 2015	Balzan	Hibernians Stadium	0–1	883		Report
5	23 September 2015	Hibernians	National Stadium	0–1	2,127		Report
6	27 September 2015	Naxxar Lions	National Stadium	3–1		Nafti (2) 40', 73', Umeh 90+2'	Report
7	3 October 2015	Tarxien Rainbows	National Stadium	3–1		Nafti 3', Oliveira 13' (o.g.), Mifsud Triganza 87'	Report
8	18 October 2015	Floriana	National Stadium	3–1	3,194	Falcone 9', Azzopardi 26', Jhonnattann 45'	Report
9	24 October 2015	Qormi	Victor Tedesco Stadium	2–1	871	Falcone 11', Nafti 82'	Report
10	3 November 2015	Mosta	Victor Tedesco Stadium	2–2	989	Cremona 23', Priso 90+3'	Report
11	6 November 2015	Pembroke Athleta	Victor Tedesco Stadium	0–2			Report
12	20 November 2015	St. Andrews	Victor Tedesco Stadium	4–0	695	Priso (2) 23', 47', Umeh 42', Mifsud Triganza 59'	Report
13	1 December 2015	Sliema Wanderers	Hibernians Stadium	4–2		Priso 33', Falcone (2) 45', 54', Nafti 52'	Report
14	5 December 2015	Birkirkara	National Stadium	4–0	2,031	Falcone 22', Briffa 34', Priso 59', Borg 90+2'	Report
15	13 December 2015	Balzan	National Stadium	2–1	1,226	Pani 36', Nafti 43'	Report
16	20 December 2015	Hibernians	National Stadium	3–2	1,948	Jhonnattann 59', Borg 66', Nafti 71'	Report
17	10 January 2016	Naxxar Lions	National Stadium	2–1		Falcone 84', Suda 88'	Report
18	16 January 2016	Tarxien Rainbows	Victor Tedesco Stadium	1–1	752	Falcone 36'	Report
19	23 January 2016	Floriana	National Stadium	2–1	2,080	Jhonnattann 68', Umeh 86'	Report
20	31 January 2016	Pembroke Athleta	Hibernians Stadium	3–2		Romeu 15', Briffa 60', Mifsud 76'	Report
21	5 February 2016	Mosta	Hibernians Stadium	3–0	608	Falcone 42', Jhonnattann 48', Cremona 83'	Report
22	13 February 2016	Qormi	Hibernians Stadium	2–0	831	Gill 52', Falcone 69'	Report

==== League table ====
Pos	Team	Pld	W	D	L	GF	GA	GD	Pts
1	Valletta	22	17	2	3	49	21	+28	53
2	Hibernians	22	15	5	2	53	25	+28	50
3	Balzan	22	14	3	5	42	21	+21	45
4	Birkirkara	22	12	6	4	41	20	+21	42
5	Floriana	22	12	3	7	36	25	+11	39
6	Tarxien Rainbows	22	10	7	5	37	17	+20	37
7	Mosta	22	8	6	8	29	33	−4	30
8	Pembroke Athleta	22	7	4	11	33	39	−6	25
9	Sliema Wanderers	22	7	3	12	31	36	−5	24
10	Naxxar Lions	22	4	2	16	22	54	−32	14
11	Qormi	22	2	3	17	19	49	−30	9
12	St. Andrews	22	1	2	19	14	66	−52	5

Source: MFA, Soccerway
Rules for classification: 1) Points; 2) Play-offs (only if needed to decide champions, teams for relegation or teams for UEFA competitions).

=== Second phase ===
==== Results ====
Match	Date	Opponent	Venue	Result	Attendance	Scorers	Report
23	21 February 2016	St. Andrews	National Stadium	2–1	1,096	Nafti (2) 19', 81'	Report
24	27 February 2016	Qormi	Hibernians Stadium	2–0	936	Cremona 5', Mifsud 59'	Report
25	1 March 2016	Naxxar Lions	Hibernians Stadium	4–0	720	Umeh 39', Ledesma 49' (pen), Falcone 64', Mifsud 88'	Report
26	6 March 2016	Sliema Wanderers	National Stadium	3–0	1,701	Umeh 17', Jhonnattann 65', Nafti 73'	Report
27	13 March 2016	Pembroke Athleta	National Stadium	2–0	1,150	Jhonnattann 14', Nafti 34'	Report
28	20 March 2016	Mosta	National Stadium	2–1	1,400	Jhonnattann 1', Borg 42'	Report
29	2 April 2016	Tarxien Rainbows	Hibernians Stadium	2–0		Falcone 48', Nafti 50'	Report
30	9 April 2016	Floriana	National Stadium	0–2	3,502		Report
31	17 April 2016	Birkirkara	National Stadium	0–0	3,854		Report
32	23 April 2016	Balzan	National Stadium	2–1	2,410	Falcone 13', Mifsud 81'	Report
33	30 April 2016	Hibernians	National Stadium	1–1	5,408	Falcone 60'	Report

==== Final league table ====
Pos	Team	Pld	W	D	L	GF	GA	GD	Pts	Qualification or relegation
1	Valletta (C)	33	25	4	4	69	27	+42	53	Qualification for the 2016–17 UEFA Champions League
2	Hibernians	33	22	8	3	85	33	+52	49	Qualification for the 2016–17 UEFA Europa League
3	Birkirkara	33	20	8	5	64	29	+35	47	Qualification for the 2016–17 UEFA Europa League
4	Balzan	33	20	6	7	69	33	+36	44	Qualification for the 2016–17 UEFA Europa League
5	Floriana	33	18	4	11	60	42	+18	39	
6	Tarxien Rainbows	33	15	8	10	59	31	+28	35	
7	Sliema Wanderers (Note: Sliema Wanderers would have qualified for the 2016–17 UEFA Europa League by winning the 2015–16 Maltese FA Trophy, but failed to obtain a UEFA licence.)	33	12	6	15	49	51	−2	30	
8	Pembroke Athleta	33	10	6	17	48	61	−13	24	
9	Mosta	33	10	7	16	42	60	−18	22	
10	St. Andrews (O)	33	4	3	26	32	90	−58	13	Qualification for the Relegation Play-Offs
11	Naxxar Lions (R)	33	5	4	24	29	95	−66	12	Relegation to the 2016–17 Maltese First Division
12	Qormi (R)	33	3	4	26	26	80	−54	9	Relegation to the 2016–17 Maltese First Division

Source: MFA, Soccerway
Rules for classification: 1) Points; 2) Play-offs (only if needed to decide champions, teams for relegation or teams for UEFA competitions).
(C) Champions; (O) Play-off winners; (R) Relegated

== FA Trophy ==
Round	Date	Opponent	Venue	Result	Scorers	Report
R3	6 January 2016	Xewkija Tigers	Kerċem Ajax Stadium	3–1	Azzopardi 16', Jhonnattann (2) 33', 38'	Report
R4	20 January 2016	Birkirkara	National Stadium	0–1		Report

== Squad statistics ==
=== First Team ===
No.	Pos.	Name	Premier League		FA Trophy		UEFA Europa League		Total		Discipline	
No.	Pos.	Name	Apps	Goals	Apps	Goals	Apps	Goals	Apps	Goals	Yellow card	Red card
1	GK	(Malta) Henry Bonello	25	0	0	0	0	0	25	0	0	0
2	DF	(Malta) Jonathan Caruana	24	0	2	0	1	0	27	0	3	0
3	DF	(Malta) Ian Azzopardi	19(6)	1	1	1	1	0	21(6)	2	6	2
4	DF	(Brazil) Diego Balbinot	2	0	1	0	0	0	3	0	1	0
5	DF	(Malta) Ryan Camilleri	29(1)	0	2	0	2	0	33(1)	0	9	1
6	MF	(Malta) Dyson Falzon	0	0	0	0	2	0	2	0	0	0
6 (Note: Juan Cruz Gill wore number 15 for the UEFA Europa League.)	DF	(Argentina) Juan Cruz Gill	31	1	1	0	2	0	34	1	5	0
9	FW	(Cameroon) Thierry Fidjeu	0	0	0	0	1	1	1	1	0	0
9 (Note: Jean Pierre Mifsud Triganza wore number 17 for the UEFA Europa League.)	FW	(Malta) Jean Pierre Mifsud Triganza	4(12)	2	0(1)	0	0(2)	0	4(15)	2	1	0
9 (Note: Michael Mifsud wore number 15 for the FA Trophy.)	FW	(Malta) Michael Mifsud	6(8)	4	0(1)	0	0	0	6(9)	4	2	0
10	MF	(Malta) Roderick Briffa	27(1)	2	2	0	1	0	30(1)	2	6	0
11	FW	(Malta) Luke Montebello	0	0	0	0	1	0	1	0	0	0
11	MF	(Ghana) Albert Bruce	6(3)	0	0	0	0	0	6(3)	0	2	0
11	MF	(Brazil) Rafael Ledesma	8(2)	1	0	0	0	0	8(2)	1	1	0
13 (Note: Nicky Vella wore number 28 for the UEFA Europa League.)	GK	(Malta) Nicky Vella	8	0	2	0	2	0	12	0	2	0
14 (Note: Daniel Camilleri wore number 20 for the UEFA Europa League.)	DF	(Malta) Daniel Camilleri	0(3)	0	0	0	0(1)	0	0(4)	0	0	0
15	FW	(Malta) Russell Fenech	0(5)	0	0	0	0	0	0(5)	0	0	0
16	MF	(Malta) Dario Tabone	0	0	0	0	0	0	0	0	0	0
16	DF	(Malta) Jean Borg	3(13)	3	1	0	0	0	4(13)	3	0	0
17	MF	(Cameroon) Njongo Priso	11(2)	8	0(1)	0	0	0	11(3)	8	3	0
17	DF	(Colombia) Luis Miguel Vergara	0	0	0	0	0	0	0	0	0	0
18	MF	(Malta) Shaun Bajada	0(1)	0	0	0	0	0	0(1)	0	0	0
18	MF	(Malta) Jurgen Suda	1(13)	1	0	0	0	0	1(13)	1	1	0
20	FW	(Argentina) Federico Falcone	28(2)	16	2	0	0	0	30(2)	16	5	1
21	MF	(Malta) Llywelyn Cremona	19(8)	3	1	0	2	0	22(8)	3	5	0
22 (Note: Nicholas Pulis wore number 23 for the UEFA Europa League.)	MF	(Malta) Nicholas Pulis	0(4)	0	0(1)	0	0	0	0(5)	0	0	0
22	MF	(Malta) Matthew Spiteri	0	0	0	0	0	0	0	0	0	0
23 (Note: Claudio Pani wore number 13 for the UEFA Europa League.)	MF	(Italy) Claudio Pani	27	1	1	0	2	0	30	1	6	0
24 (Note: Uchenna Umeh wore number 8 for the UEFA Europa League.)	FW	(Nigeria) Uchenna Umeh	16(7)	5	0(1)	0	1(1)	0	17(9)	5	7	0
26	GK	(Malta) Manuel Bartolo	0	0	0	0	0	0	0	0	0	0
27 (Note: Jhonnattann wore number 14 for the UEFA Europa League.)	FW	(Brazil) Jhonnattann	23	7	2	2	1(1)	1	26(1)	10	2	0
29	DF	(Moldova) Maxim Focșa	0	0	0	0	1	0	1	0	0	0
30	MF	(Tunisia) Abdelkarim Nafti	24(4)	11	2	0	2	0	28(4)	11	5	0
34	GK	(Italy) Pietro Marino	0	0	0	0	0	0	0	0	0	0
90	DF	(Brazil) Romeu	21(3)	1	2	0	0	0	23(3)	1	6	2
90	MF	(Malta) Stefan Cassar	0	0	0	0	0	0	0	0	0	0
90	DF	(Malta) Leon Camilleri	0	0	0	0	0	0	0	0	0	0

== Transfers ==
=== In ===
Date	Pos.	Name	From	Fee	Ref.
7 June 2015	MF	(Cameroon) Njongo Priso	(Hungary) Győri ETO	Free	
7 June 2015	DF	(Moldova) Maxim Focșa	(Moldova) FC Dinamo-Auto Tiraspol	Free	
19 June 2015	FW	(Cameroon) Thierry Fidjeu	(France) Saint-Colomban Locminé	Free	
19 June 2015	MF	(Italy) Claudio Pani	(Italy) Campobasso	Free	
19 June 2015	FW	(Nigeria) Uchenna Umeh	(Lithuania) Panevėžio Ekranas	Free	
19 June 2015	FW	(Brazil) Jhonnattann	(Bahrain) Al-Muharraq	Free	
19 June 2015	DF	(Argentina) Juan Cruz Gill	(Chile) Iberia	Free	
19 June 2015	GK	(Ukraine) Oleksandr Musiyenko	(Ukraine) FC Nyva Ternopil	Free	
10 July 2015	DF	(Malta) Jean Borg	(Malta) Attard	Free	
31 July 2015	DF	(Brazil) Romeu	Unattached	Free	
8 August 2015	FW	(Argentina) Federico Falcone	(Chile) Rangers de Talca	Free	
25 August 2015	MF	(Ghana) Albert Bruce	(Malta) Qormi	Free	
5 November 2015	MF	(Namibia) Ennio Hamutenya	Unattached	Free	
20 January 2016	FW	(Malta) Michael Mifsud	(Malta) Sliema Wanderers	Free	
29 January 2016	DF	(Colombia) Luis Miguel Vergara	Unattached	Free	
29 January 2016	GK	(Malta) Henry Bonello	(Malta) Sliema Wanderers	Free	
1 February 2016	MF	(Brazil) Rafael Ledesma	(Malta) Sliema Wanderers	Free	

=== Out ===
Date	Pos.	Name	To	Fee	Ref.
5 July 2015	GK	(Ukraine) Oleksandr Musiyenko	Released	Free	
9 July 2015	GK	(Italy) Pietro Marino	Released	Free	
19 July 2015	FW	(Cameroon) Thierry Fidjeu	Released	Free	
23 July 2015	MF	(Malta) Matthew Thorne	(Malta) St. George's	Free	
20 August 2015	DF	(Malta) Jonathan Francica	(Malta) Luqa	Free	
31 August 2015	MF	(Malta) Shaun Bajada	(Gozo) Għajnsielem	Free	
30 September 2015	DF	(Malta) Tristan Nappa Licari	(Malta) Gudja United	Free	
11 January 2016	MF	(Cameroon) Njongo Priso	Released	Free	
31 May 2016	DF	(Brazil) Diego Balbinot	Released	Free	
31 May 2016	DF	(Colombia) Luis Miguel Vergara	Released	Free	
31 May 2016	MF	(Ghana) Albert Bruce	Released	Free	
31 May 2016	MF	(Tunisia) Abdelkarim Nafti	Released	Free	

=== Loan in ===
Date from	Date to	Pos.	Name	From	Ref.
9 July 2015	28 January 2016	GK	(Malta) Henry Bonello	(Malta) Sliema Wanderers	
1 August 2015	31 May 2016	MF	(Malta) Stefan Cassar	(Malta) Oratory Youths	
1 August 2015	31 May 2016	FW	(Malta) Joshua Buttigieg	(Malta) Qala Saints	

=== Loan out ===
Date from	Date to	Pos.	Name	To	Ref.
20 July 2015	31 May 2016	MF	(Malta) Dyson Falzon	(Malta) Mosta	
29 July 2015	31 May 2016	FW	(Malta) Kurt Borg	(Malta) Żebbuġ Rangers	
1 August 2015	1 April 2016	FW	(Malta) Terence Scerri	(Malta) Senglea Athletic	
1 August 2015	31 May 2016	MF	(Malta) Siraj Arab	(Malta) Pembroke Athleta	
1 August 2015	31 May 2016	DF	(Malta) Miguel Attard	(Malta) Pembroke Athleta	
1 August 2015	31 May 2016	DF	(Malta) Dario Tabone	(Malta) Żebbuġ Rangers	
1 August 2015	31 May 2016	MF	(Malta) Dasser Sammut	(Malta) Qrendi	
3 August 2015	31 May 2016	DF	(Moldova) Maxim Focșa	(Malta) Balzan	
15 August 2015	31 May 2016	MF	(Malta) Cleavon Frendo	(Malta) Marsa	
19 August 2015	1 December 2015	MF	(Malta) Bjorn Bondin	(Malta) Gudja United	
24 August 2015	31 May 2016	FW	(Malta) Luke Montebello	(Malta) Tarxien Rainbows	
24 August 2015	31 May 2016	MF	(Malta) Karl Azzopardi	(Malta) Għargħur	
28 August 2015	31 May 2016	MF	(Malta) Kurt Magro	(Malta) Qormi	
30 August 2015	15 January 2016	MF	(Malta) Isaac McCarthy	(Malta) Naxxar Lions	
31 August 2015	31 May 2016	DF	(Malta) Fabio Muscat	(Malta) Luqa	
1 September 2015	31 May 2016	MF	(Malta) Brandon Grech	(Malta) Mqabba	
1 September 2015	31 May 2016	DF	(Malta) Dean Grech	(Malta) Swieqi United	
2 December 2015	31 May 2016	MF	(Malta) Bjorn Bondin	(Malta) Qrendi	
7 January 2016	31 May 2016	MF	(Namibia) Ennio Hamutenya	(Malta) Naxxar Lions	
12 January 2016	31 May 2016	MF	(Malta) Ian Montanaro	(Malta) Żejtun Corinthians	
20 January 2016	31 May 2016	DF	(Malta) Kieron Grima	(Malta) Żebbuġ Rangers	
21 January 2016	31 May 2016	FW	(Malta) Jean Pierre Mifsud Triganza	(Gozo) Għajnsielem	
1 February 2016	31 May 2016	MF	(Ghana) Albert Bruce	(Malta) Sliema Wanderers	
1 February 2016	31 May 2016	MF	(Malta) Isaac Zammit	(Malta) San Ġwann	
1 February 2016	31 May 2016	MF	(Malta) Isaac McCarthy	(Malta) Lija Athletic	
