= 2017–18 Valletta F.C. season =

Maltese football team season

Valletta
2017–18 season
- Manager: Zoran Popović, Danilo Dončić
- Premier League: 1st
- UEFA Europa League: Second Qualifying Round
- FA Trophy: Winners
- Top goalscorer: League: Matteo Piciollo (8); All: Santiago Malano & Matteo Piciollo (9)

The 2017–18 season was Valletta's twenty-fourth title-winning season in the Maltese Premier League and the 14th as the Maltese FA Trophy winners. They were, however, eliminated in the second qualifying round of the UEFA Europa League, losing out to FC Utrecht, after having already dispatched SS Folgore Falciano Calcio of San Marino in the first qualifying round.

== UEFA Europa League ==
=== First qualifying round ===
29 June 2017 1st leg	Valletta (Malta)	2–0	Folgore (San Marino)	Paola, Malta
	S. Borg 42'; Velasco 48'; J. Zerafa (yellow card) 65'; Je. Borg (yellow card) 87'	Report	Genestreti (yellow card) 33'	Stadium: Hibernians Stadium; Attendance: 1,141; Referee: Denis Scherbakov (Belarus)

6 July 2017 2nd leg	Folgore (San Marino)	0–1	Valletta (Malta)	Serravalle, San Marino
	Sacco (yellow card) 59'; Bezzi (yellow card) 64'	Report	Pani (yellow card) 41'; J. Zerafa (yellow card) 56'; Santiago 65'; Umeh (yellow card) 69'; Briffa (yellow card) 84'	Stadium: San Marino Stadium; Attendance: 437; Referee: Genc Nuza (Kosovo)

Valletta won 3-0 on aggregate.

=== Second qualifying round ===
13 July 2017 1st leg	Valletta (Malta)	0–0	Utrecht (Netherlands)	Paola, Malta
	Romeu (yellow card) 60'; Mifsud (yellow card) 78'; S. Borg (yellow card) 80'; Pani (yellow card) 84'	Report	Hardeveld (yellow card) 60'; Labyad (yellow card) 64'; Klaiber (yellow card) 90+4'	Stadium: Hibernians Stadium; Attendance: 1,795; Referee: Ognjen Valjić (Bosnia and Herzegovina)

20 July 2017 2nd leg	Utrecht (Netherlands)	3–1	Valletta (Malta)	Waalwijk, Netherlands
	Klaiber 18'; Janssen (yellow card) 57', (goal) 76'; Labyad 83'	Report	J. Zerafa (yellow card) 13'; Mifsud (yellow card) 29'; Santiago 88'	Stadium: RKC Waalwijk Stadion; Attendance: 5,550; Referee: Ian McNabb (Northern Ireland)

Utrecht won 3-1 on aggregate.

== BOV Premier League ==
=== Results ===
Match	Date	Opponent	Venue	Result	Attendance	Scorers	Report
1	19 August 2017	Mosta	Centenary Stadium	1–0	712	Pani 45' (pen)	Report
2	25 August 2017	Senglea Athletic	Centenary Stadium	1–0		Mifsud 34'	Report
3	10 September 2017	Naxxar Lions	National Stadium	0–0			Report
4	17 September 2017	Sliema Wanderers	National Stadium	1–0		Ašćerić 14'	Report
5	24 September 2017	Balzan	National Stadium	1–2	979	Santiago 5'	Report
6	29 September 2017	Birkirkara	National Stadium	3–0		Mifsud 12', Nwoko 31', Denni 62'	Report
7	13 October 2017	Lija Athletic	Victor Tedesco Stadium	4–2	879	Piciollo (2) 11', 61', Denni 32', Nwoko 46'	Report
8	21 October 2017	Tarxien Rainbows	Centenary Stadium	6–0	805	Gill 10', Nwoko (2) 34', 83', Santiago 45', Piciollo 51', Fenech 80'	Report
9	28 October 2017	St. Andrews	Centenary Stadium	3–0		Denni 6', Je. Borg 21', Piciollo 33'	Report
10	5 November 2017	Hibernians	National Stadium	0–0	2,087		Report
11	19 November 2017	Ħamrun Spartans	National Stadium	0–0	2,521		Report
12	26 November 2017	Floriana	National Stadium	1–0	3,681	Piciollo 80'	Report
13	10 December 2017	Gżira United	Hibernians Stadium	1–2	914	Denni 66' (pen)	Report
14	16 December 2017	Mosta	Hibernians Stadium	1–0		Denni 4'	Report
15	6 January 2018	Senglea Athletic	Hibernians Stadium	1–0	775	Denni 59' (pen)	Report
16	13 January 2018	Naxxar Lions	Victor Tedesco Stadium	1–0	955	Santiago 23'	Report
17	26 January 2018	Sliema Wanderers	Centenary Stadium	1–1		Prosa 82'	Report
18	4 February 2018	Balzan	National Stadium	0–0	2,023		Report
19	12 February 2018	Lija Athletic	Centenary Stadium	3–1		Prosa 34', Alba (2) 65', 74'	Report
20	25 February 2018	Birkirkara	National Stadium	0–0	4,013		Report
21	3 March 2018	Tarxien Rainbows	National Stadium	2–0	721	Santiago 51', Piciollo 55'	Report
22	11 March 2018	Hibernians	National Stadium	2–1	2,571	Santiago 25', Prosa 30'	Report
23	17 March 2018	St. Andrews	National Stadium	1–0	734	Mifsud 90+4'	Report
24	8 April 2018	Ħamrun Spartans	National Stadium	3–0	2,690	Nwoko (2) 33', 78', Santiago 41'	Report
25	14 April 2018	Floriana	National Stadium	1–1		Piciollo 9'	Report
26	21 April 2018	Gżira United	National Stadium	2–1	3,561	Piciollo 7', Saleh 65'	Report

=== League table ===
Pos	Team	Pld	W	D	L	GF	GA	GD	Pts	Qualification or relegation
1	Valletta (C)	26	17	7	2	40	11	+29	58	Qualification for the Champions League first qualifying round
2	Balzan	26	16	7	3	42	19	+23	55	Qualification for the Europa League first qualifying round
3	Gżira United	26	15	6	5	52	33	+19	51	Qualification for the Europa League preliminary round
4	Birkirkara (Note: Since the winners of 2017–18 Maltese FA Trophy, Valletta, qualified for European competition based on their league position, the spot awarded to the Cup winner (2018–19 UEFA Europa League) was passed to the next best-placed team (in this case, to the fourth-placed team).)	26	15	2	9	44	28	+16	47	Qualification for the Europa League preliminary round
5	Hibernians	26	13	7	6	43	16	+27	46	
6	Floriana	26	12	10	4	48	18	+30	46	
7	Sliema Wanderers	26	11	7	8	35	26	+9	40	
8	Hamrun Spartans	26	10	5	11	39	33	+6	35	
9	Senglea Athletic	26	7	5	14	29	47	−18	26	
10	Mosta	26	7	5	14	28	52	−24	26	
11	St. Andrews	26	6	6	14	21	41	−20	24	
12	Tarxien Rainbows (O)	26	6	5	15	34	56	−22	23	Qualification for the Relegation Play-Offs
13	Naxxar Lions (R)	26	5	7	14	27	41	−14	22	Relegation to the 2018–19 Maltese First Division
14	Lija Athletic (R)	26	1	3	22	23	84	−61	6	Relegation to the 2018–19 Maltese First Division

Source: Malta Football Association, Soccerway
Rules for classification: 1) Points; 2) Play-offs (only if needed to decide champions, teams for relegation or teams for UEFA competitions).
(C) Champions; (O) Play-off winners; (R) Relegated

== The FA Trophy ==
Round	Date	Opponent	Venue	Result	Attendance	Scorers	Report
R3	2 December 2017	Senglea Athletic	Centenary Stadium	2–0		Saleh 27', Mifsud 29'	Report
R4	21 January 2018	Pietà Hotspurs	National Stadium	1–0	1,146	R. Camilleri 2'	Report
Quarter-final	17 February 2018	Żejtun Corinthians	National Stadium	2–0		Nwoko 25', S. Borg 70'	Report
Semi-final	29 April 2018	Balzan	National Stadium	2–1	2,472	Denni 80' (pen), Piciollo 82'	Report
Final	5 May 2018	Birkirkara	National Stadium	2–1	7,011	Nwoko 41', Santiago 79'	Report

== Squad statistics ==
=== First Team ===
No.	Pos.	Name	BOV Premier League		UEFA Europa League		The FA Trophy		Total		Discipline	
No.	Pos.	Name	Apps	Goals	Apps	Goals	Apps	Goals	Apps	Goals	Yellow card	Red card
1	GK	(Malta) Henry Bonello	24	0	4	0	4	0	32	0	3	0
4	DF	(Malta) Steve Borg	22	0	4	1	4	1	30	2	11	2
5	DF	(Malta) Ryan Camilleri	25	0	4	0	3	1	32	1	3	0
6	DF	(Argentina) Juan Cruz Gill	16(2)	1	4	0	2(2)	0	22(4)	1	3	0
8	MF	(Argentina) Santiago Malano	24(2)	6	4	2	4	1	32(2)	9	1	0
9	FW	(Malta) Michael Mifsud	8(10)	3	4	0	2(1)	1	14(11)	4	2	0
9	FW	(Malta) Kenny Spagnol	0	0	0	0	0	0	0	0	0	0
9	FW	(Malta) Ryan Tonna	0	0	0	0	0	0	0	0	0	0
10	MF	(Malta) Roderick Briffa	0	0	0(4)	0	0	0	0(4)	0	1	0
10	FW	(Italy) Matteo Piciollo	19(3)	8	0	0	4	1	23(3)	9	3	0
10	DF	(Malta) Paul Chircop	0	0	0	0	0	0	0	0	0	0
11	FW	(Malta) Orson Mackay	0	0	0	0	0	0	0	0	0	0
11	DF	(Malta) Gianluca Borg	0	0	0	0	0	0	0	0	0	0
11	MF	(Malta) Shaun Dimech	0	0	0	0	0	0	0	0	0	0
11	DF	(Malta) Jake Borg	0	0	0	0	0	0	0	0	0	0
13	GK	(Malta) Nicky Vella	2	0	0	0	1	0	3	0	0	0
13	GK	(Malta) Andre Spiteri	0	0	0	0	0	0	0	0	0	0
14	FW	(Malta) Kyrian Nwoko	14(12)	6	0(4)	0	4	2	18(16)	8	1	0
15	FW	(Malta) Russell Fenech	0(2)	1	0	0	0(1)	0	0(3)	1	1	0
16	DF	(Malta) Jean Borg	16(6)	1	0(4)	0	1(3)	0	17(13)	1	3	0
17	MF	(Nigeria) Uchenna Umeh	7(4)	0	4	0	1(1)	0	12(5)	0	3	0
17	DF	(Malta) Miguel Ghigo	0	0	0	0	0	0	0	0	0	0
18	MF	(Malta) Jurgen Suda	0	0	0	0	0	0	0	0	0	0
18	DF	(Dominican Republic) Enmy Peña	10(1)	0	0	0	4	0	14(1)	0	3	0
19	DF	(Malta) Joseph Zerafa	18(1)	0	4	0	5	0	29(1)	0	14	1
20	MF	(Malta) Matthew Spiteri	0	0	0	0	0	0	0	0	0	0
20	MF	(Oman) Raed Ibrahim Saleh	24	1	0	0	4	1	28	2	1	0
21	MF	(Brazil) Denni	9(9)	6	0	0	1(2)	1	10(11)	7	4	0
22	MF	(Malta) Nicholas Pulis	0(5)	0	0	0	0(2)	0	0(7)	0	0	0
23	MF	(Italy) Claudio Pani	8(4)	1	4	0	3	0	15(4)	1	6	1
23	DF	(Malta) Daniel Camilleri	0	0	0	0	0	0	0	0	0	0
24	MF	(Malta) Rowen Muscat	10(8)	0	0	0	3(1)	0	13(9)	0	3	0
24	MF	(Malta) Jeremy Micallef	0	0	0	0	0	0	0	0	0	0
25	DF	(Malta) Leonard Farrugia	0	0	0	0	0	0	0	0	0	0
27	FW	(Argentina) Maximiliano Velasco	0	0	4	1	0	0	4	1	0	0
27	FW	(Argentina) Miguel Alba	11	2	0	0	4	0	15	2	5	0
29	GK	(Malta) Maverick Buhagiar	0	0	0	0	0	0	0	0	0	0
90	DF	(Brazil) Romeu	5(1)	0	4	0	1	0	10(1)	0	3	0
99	FW	(Serbia) Nikola Ašćerić	5	1	0	0	0	0	5	1	2	0
99	FW	(Estonia) Albert Prosa	8(2)	3	0	0	0(2)	0	8(4)	3	1	0

== Transfers ==
=== In ===
Date	Pos.	Name	From	Fee	Ref.
14 June 2017	FW	(Malta) Kyrian Nwoko	(Malta) St. Andrews	Free	
15 June 2017	GK	(Malta) Henry Bonello	(Malta) Birkirkara	Free	
16 June 2017	DF	(Malta) Joseph Zerafa	(Malta) Birkirkara	Free	
14 July 2017	MF	(Oman) Raed Ibrahim Saleh	(Oman) Fanja	Free	
17 July 2017	MF	(Brazil) Denni	(Malta) Sliema Wanderers	Free	
1 August 2017	MF	(Malta) Benjamin Giles Debrincat	(Malta) Swieqi United	Free	
16 August 2017	FW	(Serbia) Nikola Ašćerić	(Japan) Tokushima Vortis	Free	
24 August 2017	FW	(Italy) Matteo Piciollo	(Malta) Floriana	Free	
6 December 2017	FW	(Estonia) Albert Prosa	(Estonia) FCI Tallinn	Free	
5 January 2018	DF	(Dominican Republic) Enmy Peña	(Malta) St. Andrews	Free	
11 January 2018	FW	(Argentina) Miguel Alba	(Argentina) Gimnasia y Tiro	Free	

=== Out ===
Date	Pos.	Name	To	Fee	Ref.
1 June 2017	FW	(Brazil) Jhonnattann	(Saudi Arabia) Al-Batin	Free	
18 June 2017	FW	(Malta) Luke Montebello	(Malta) Birkirkara	Free	
3 July 2017	MF	(Namibia) Ennio Hamutenya	Unattached	Released	
5 July 2017	MF	(Malta) Llywelyn Cremona	(Malta) Birkirkara	Free	
7 July 2017	DF	(Malta) Leon Camilleri	(Malta) Gudja United	Free	
9 July 2017	GK	(Lithuania) Dziugas Bartkus	(Lithuania) Žalgiris	Free	
10 July 2017	FW	(Lithuania) Tomas Radzinevičius	(Czech Republic) Spartak Chrastava	Free	
11 July 2017	DF	(Malta) Ian Azzopardi	(Malta) Senglea Athletic	Free	
23 July 2017	MF	(Malta) Matthew Spiteri	(Malta) Tarxien Rainbows	Free	
31 July 2017	FW	(Argentina) Maximiliano Velasco	Unattached	Released	
1 August 2017	FW	(Malta) Dasser Sammut	(Malta) Qrendi	Free	
5 August 2017	FW	(Malta) Isaac Zammit	(Malta) Swieqi United	Free	
10 August 2017	FW	(Malta) Kurt Borg	(Malta) Żabbar St. Patrick	Free	
16 August 2017	DF	(Argentina) Leandro Aguirre	(Argentina) Gimnasia y Esgrima	Free	
17 August 2017	MF	(Malta) Roderick Briffa	(Malta) Gżira United	Free	
20 November 2017	FW	(Malta) Kenny Spagnol	(Malta) Żejtun Corinthians	Free	
23 January 2018	DF	(Malta) Daniel Camilleri	(Malta) Swieqi United	Free	
26 January 2018	FW	(Serbia) Nikola Ašćerić	(Greece) PAS Lamia 1964	Free	
8 May 2018	MF	(Brazil) Denni	Unattached	Released	

=== Loan out ===
Date from	Date to	Pos.	Name	To	Ref.
2 July 2017	30 April 2018	MF	(Malta) Bjorn Bondin	(Malta) Qrendi	
8 July 2017	30 April 2018	DF	(Malta) Fabio Muscat	(Malta) Msida St. Joseph	
20 July 2017	30 April 2018	DF	(Malta) Brandon Grech	(Malta) Qormi	
22 July 2017	30 April 2018	DF	(Malta) Miguel Attard	(Malta) Żebbuġ Rangers	
28 July 2017	1 December 2017	DF	(Malta) Kieron Grima	(Malta) Qormi	
31 July 2017	30 April 2018	FW	(Malta) Terence Scerri	(Malta) Senglea Athletic	
11 August 2017	28 December 2017	MF	(Malta) Jurgen Suda	(Malta) Żebbuġ Rangers	
31 August 2017	3 January 2018	MF	(Malta) Cleavon Frendo	(Malta) Fgura United	
28 September 2017	30 April 2018	FW	(Malta) Isaac McCarthy	(Malta) Lija Athletic	
2 January 2018	31 May 2018	DF	(Malta) Leonard Farrugia	(Malta) Mqabba	
4 January 2018	30 April 2018	MF	(Malta) Jurgen Suda	(Malta) Senglea Athletic	
4 January 2018	30 April 2018	MF	(Malta) Dario Tabone	(Malta) Vittoriosa Stars	
19 January 2018	30 April 2018	MF	(Malta) Cleavon Frendo	(Malta) Marsaxlokk	
