= List of Maltese football transfers summer 2018 =

This is a list of Maltese football transfers for the 2018–19 summer transfer window by club. Only transfers of clubs in the Maltese Premier League and Maltese First Division are included.

The summer transfer window opened on 1 July 2018, although a few transfers may take place prior to that date. The window closed at midnight on 31 August 2018. Players without a club may join one at any time, either during or in between transfer windows.

== Maltese Premier League ==
=== Balzan ===
Manager: (Serbia) Marko Micovic

In: Note: Flags indicate national team as defined under FIFA eligibility rules; some limited exceptions apply. Players may hold more than one non-FIFA nationality.

| No. | Pos. | Nation | Player |
|---|---|---|---|
| — | GK | (Malta) MLT | Steve Sultana (from Ħamrun Spartans) |
| — | MF | (Malta) MLT | Dale Camilleri (from Ħamrun Spartans) |

Out: Note: Flags indicate national team as defined under FIFA eligibility rules; some limited exceptions apply. Players may hold more than one non-FIFA nationality.

| No. | Pos. | Nation | Player |
|---|---|---|---|
| — | MF | (Malta) MLT | Terence Agius (to Birkirkara) |
| 8 | MF | (Malta) MLT | Paul Fenech (to Birkirkara) |
| 6 | MF | (Malta) MLT | Ryan Fenech (to Sliema Wanderers) |

=== Birkirkara ===
Manager: (Malta) Paul Zammit

In: Note: Flags indicate national team as defined under FIFA eligibility rules; some limited exceptions apply. Players may hold more than one non-FIFA nationality.

| No. | Pos. | Nation | Player |
|---|---|---|---|
| 4 | DF | (Brazil) BRA | Eduardo Mancha (from (Brazil) Guarani) |
| 5 | DF | (Croatia) CRO | Arian Mršulja (from (Italy) A.S.D. Mezzolara) |
| 23 | MF | (Malta) MLT | Terence Agius (from Balzan) |
| 6 | MF | (Malta) MLT | Paul Fenech (from Balzan) |
| 24 | MF | (Nigeria) NGA | Uchenna Umeh (from Valletta) |
| 17 | FW | (Brazil) BRA | Marcelinho (from (Brazil) Nacional) |
| 14 | FW | (Malta) MLT | Michael Mifsud (from Valletta) |
| — | FW | (Brazil) BRA | Thiago Brito (from (Brazil) Manaus) |

Out: Note: Flags indicate national team as defined under FIFA eligibility rules; some limited exceptions apply. Players may hold more than one non-FIFA nationality.

| No. | Pos. | Nation | Player |

=== Floriana ===
Manager: (Argentina) Nicolas Hernan Chiesa

In: Note: Flags indicate national team as defined under FIFA eligibility rules; some limited exceptions apply. Players may hold more than one non-FIFA nationality.

| No. | Pos. | Nation | Player |
|---|---|---|---|
| 13 | MF | (Malta) MLT | Clayton Failla (from Hibernians) |
| — | MF | (Bosnia and Herzegovina) BIH | Goran Galešić (from (Bosnia and Herzegovina) FK Krupa) |
| — | FW | (Malta) MLT | Terence Vella (from Senglea Athletic) |
| — | DF | (Palestine) PLE | Mohammed Saleh (from (Palestine) Ahli Al-Khaleel) |

Out: Note: Flags indicate national team as defined under FIFA eligibility rules; some limited exceptions apply. Players may hold more than one non-FIFA nationality.

| No. | Pos. | Nation | Player |
|---|---|---|---|
| 89 | FW | (Italy) ITA | Mario Fontanella (to Valletta) |

=== Gżira United ===
Manager: (Malta) Darren Abdilla

In: Note: Flags indicate national team as defined under FIFA eligibility rules; some limited exceptions apply. Players may hold more than one non-FIFA nationality.

| No. | Pos. | Nation | Player |
|---|---|---|---|
| — | DF | (Brazil) BRA | Rodolfo Soares (from Hibernians) |
| — | DF | (Italy) ITA | Thomas Veronese (from Mosta) |
| — | MF | (Brazil) BRA | Jorginho (from Hibernians) |

Out: Note: Flags indicate national team as defined under FIFA eligibility rules; some limited exceptions apply. Players may hold more than one non-FIFA nationality.

| No. | Pos. | Nation | Player |
|---|---|---|---|
| 25 | DF | (England) ENG | Kris Thackray (released) |
| 44 | DF | (Brazil) BRA | Tony (released) |
| 14 | MF | (Spain) ESP | Moises Pérez (released) |
| 9 | FW | (Nigeria) NGA | Haruna Garba (on loan to (Sudan) Al-Hilal Club) |

=== Ħamrun Spartans ===
Manager: (Italy) Giovanni Tedesco

In: Note: Flags indicate national team as defined under FIFA eligibility rules; some limited exceptions apply. Players may hold more than one non-FIFA nationality.

| No. | Pos. | Nation | Player |
|---|---|---|---|
| — | MF | (Italy) ITA | Antonio Monticelli (from (Italy) U.S. Palmese 1912) |
| — | FW | (Brazil) BRA | Caetano Calil (from (Italy) Siracusa) |

Out: Note: Flags indicate national team as defined under FIFA eligibility rules; some limited exceptions apply. Players may hold more than one non-FIFA nationality.

| No. | Pos. | Nation | Player |
|---|---|---|---|
| 1 | GK | (Malta) MLT | Steve Sultana (to Balzan) |
| 4 | MF | (Malta) MLT | Dale Camilleri (to Balzan) |
| 5 | MF | (Brazil) BRA | Tiago Indio (to Nadur Youngsters) |
| 17 | MF | (Brazil) BRA | Arthur Faria (released) |
| 20 | FW | (Brazil) BRA | Chico (to (Brazil) Rio Claro) |

=== Hibernians ===
Manager: (Italy) Stefano Sanderra

In: Note: Flags indicate national team as defined under FIFA eligibility rules; some limited exceptions apply. Players may hold more than one non-FIFA nationality.

| No. | Pos. | Nation | Player |

Out: Note: Flags indicate national team as defined under FIFA eligibility rules; some limited exceptions apply. Players may hold more than one non-FIFA nationality.

| No. | Pos. | Nation | Player |
|---|---|---|---|
| 8 | DF | (Brazil) BRA | Rodolfo Soares (to Gżira United) |
| 13 | MF | (Malta) MLT | Clayton Failla (to Floriana) |
| 23 | MF | (Brazil) BRA | Jorginho (to Gżira United) |

=== Mosta ===
Manager: (Malta) Johann Scicluna

In: Note: Flags indicate national team as defined under FIFA eligibility rules; some limited exceptions apply. Players may hold more than one non-FIFA nationality.

| No. | Pos. | Nation | Player |
|---|---|---|---|
| — | DF | (Brazil) BRA | Romeu (from Valletta) |
| — | FW | (Brazil) BRA | Johnny Dias |
| — | FW | (Senegal) SEN | Falou Samb (from (Italy) Genoa) |

Out: Note: Flags indicate national team as defined under FIFA eligibility rules; some limited exceptions apply. Players may hold more than one non-FIFA nationality.

| No. | Pos. | Nation | Player |
|---|---|---|---|
| 33 | DF | (Italy) ITA | Thomas Veronese (to Gżira United) |

=== Pietà Hotspurs ===
Manager: (Malta) Ramon Zammit

In: Note: Flags indicate national team as defined under FIFA eligibility rules; some limited exceptions apply. Players may hold more than one non-FIFA nationality.

| No. | Pos. | Nation | Player |
|---|---|---|---|
| — | GK | (Malta) MLT | Nicky Vella (on loan from Valletta) |

Out: Note: Flags indicate national team as defined under FIFA eligibility rules; some limited exceptions apply. Players may hold more than one non-FIFA nationality.

| No. | Pos. | Nation | Player |

=== Qormi ===
Manager: (Malta) Brian Spiteri

In: Note: Flags indicate national team as defined under FIFA eligibility rules; some limited exceptions apply. Players may hold more than one non-FIFA nationality.

| No. | Pos. | Nation | Player |

Out: Note: Flags indicate national team as defined under FIFA eligibility rules; some limited exceptions apply. Players may hold more than one non-FIFA nationality.

| No. | Pos. | Nation | Player |

=== Senglea Athletic ===
Manager: (Malta) Steve D'Amato

In: Note: Flags indicate national team as defined under FIFA eligibility rules; some limited exceptions apply. Players may hold more than one non-FIFA nationality.

| No. | Pos. | Nation | Player |

Out: Note: Flags indicate national team as defined under FIFA eligibility rules; some limited exceptions apply. Players may hold more than one non-FIFA nationality.

| No. | Pos. | Nation | Player |
|---|---|---|---|
| 3 | DF | (Malta) MLT | Ian Azzopardi (to Zejtun Corinthians) |
| 10 | FW | (Malta) MLT | Terence Vella (to Floriana) |

=== Sliema Wanderers ===
Manager: (Malta) John Buttigieg

In: Note: Flags indicate national team as defined under FIFA eligibility rules; some limited exceptions apply. Players may hold more than one non-FIFA nationality.

| No. | Pos. | Nation | Player |
|---|---|---|---|
| — | MF | (Malta) MLT | Ryan Fenech (from Balzan) |
| — | MF | (Italy) ITA | Claudio Pani (from Valletta) |

Out: Note: Flags indicate national team as defined under FIFA eligibility rules; some limited exceptions apply. Players may hold more than one non-FIFA nationality.

| No. | Pos. | Nation | Player |

=== St. Andrews ===
Manager: (Malta) Michael Woods

In: Note: Flags indicate national team as defined under FIFA eligibility rules; some limited exceptions apply. Players may hold more than one non-FIFA nationality.

| No. | Pos. | Nation | Player |

Out: Note: Flags indicate national team as defined under FIFA eligibility rules; some limited exceptions apply. Players may hold more than one non-FIFA nationality.

| No. | Pos. | Nation | Player |

=== Tarxien Rainbows ===
Manager: (Malta) Jose Borg

In: Note: Flags indicate national team as defined under FIFA eligibility rules; some limited exceptions apply. Players may hold more than one non-FIFA nationality.

| No. | Pos. | Nation | Player |

Out: Note: Flags indicate national team as defined under FIFA eligibility rules; some limited exceptions apply. Players may hold more than one non-FIFA nationality.

| No. | Pos. | Nation | Player |

=== Valletta ===
Manager: (Serbia) Danilo Dončić

In: Note: Flags indicate national team as defined under FIFA eligibility rules; some limited exceptions apply. Players may hold more than one non-FIFA nationality.

| No. | Pos. | Nation | Player |
|---|---|---|---|
| — | FW | (Italy) ITA | Mario Fontanella (from Floriana) |

Out: Note: Flags indicate national team as defined under FIFA eligibility rules; some limited exceptions apply. Players may hold more than one non-FIFA nationality.

| No. | Pos. | Nation | Player |
|---|---|---|---|
| 28 | GK | (Malta) MLT | Nicky Vella (on loan to Pietà Hotspurs) |
| 6 | DF | (Argentina) ARG | Juan Cruz Gill (released) |
| 90 | DF | (Brazil) BRA | Romeu (to Mosta) |
| 23 | MF | (Italy) ITA | Claudio Pani (to Sliema Wanderers) |
| 24 | MF | (Nigeria) NGA | Uchenna Umeh (to Birkirkara) |
| 9 | FW | (Malta) MLT | Michael Mifsud (to Birkirkara) |
| 99 | FW | (Estonia) EST | Albert Prosa (released) |

== Maltese First Division ==
=== Lija Athletic ===
Manager: (Malta)

In: Note: Flags indicate national team as defined under FIFA eligibility rules; some limited exceptions apply. Players may hold more than one non-FIFA nationality.

| No. | Pos. | Nation | Player |

Out: Note: Flags indicate national team as defined under FIFA eligibility rules; some limited exceptions apply. Players may hold more than one non-FIFA nationality.

| No. | Pos. | Nation | Player |

=== Marsa ===
Manager: (Malta)

In: Note: Flags indicate national team as defined under FIFA eligibility rules; some limited exceptions apply. Players may hold more than one non-FIFA nationality.

| No. | Pos. | Nation | Player |

Out: Note: Flags indicate national team as defined under FIFA eligibility rules; some limited exceptions apply. Players may hold more than one non-FIFA nationality.

| No. | Pos. | Nation | Player |

=== Mqabba ===
Manager: (Malta)

In: Note: Flags indicate national team as defined under FIFA eligibility rules; some limited exceptions apply. Players may hold more than one non-FIFA nationality.

| No. | Pos. | Nation | Player |

Out: Note: Flags indicate national team as defined under FIFA eligibility rules; some limited exceptions apply. Players may hold more than one non-FIFA nationality.

| No. | Pos. | Nation | Player |

=== Naxxar Lions ===
Manager: (Malta)

In: Note: Flags indicate national team as defined under FIFA eligibility rules; some limited exceptions apply. Players may hold more than one non-FIFA nationality.

| No. | Pos. | Nation | Player |

Out: Note: Flags indicate national team as defined under FIFA eligibility rules; some limited exceptions apply. Players may hold more than one non-FIFA nationality.

| No. | Pos. | Nation | Player |

=== Qrendi ===
Manager: (Malta)

In: Note: Flags indicate national team as defined under FIFA eligibility rules; some limited exceptions apply. Players may hold more than one non-FIFA nationality.

| No. | Pos. | Nation | Player |

Out: Note: Flags indicate national team as defined under FIFA eligibility rules; some limited exceptions apply. Players may hold more than one non-FIFA nationality.

| No. | Pos. | Nation | Player |

=== San Gwann ===
Manager: (Malta)

In: Note: Flags indicate national team as defined under FIFA eligibility rules; some limited exceptions apply. Players may hold more than one non-FIFA nationality.

| No. | Pos. | Nation | Player |

Out: Note: Flags indicate national team as defined under FIFA eligibility rules; some limited exceptions apply. Players may hold more than one non-FIFA nationality.

| No. | Pos. | Nation | Player |

=== Sirens ===
Manager: (Malta) Vince Carbonaro

In: Note: Flags indicate national team as defined under FIFA eligibility rules; some limited exceptions apply. Players may hold more than one non-FIFA nationality.

| No. | Pos. | Nation | Player |

Out: Note: Flags indicate national team as defined under FIFA eligibility rules; some limited exceptions apply. Players may hold more than one non-FIFA nationality.

| No. | Pos. | Nation | Player |

=== Vittoriosa Stars ===
Manager: (Malta)

In: Note: Flags indicate national team as defined under FIFA eligibility rules; some limited exceptions apply. Players may hold more than one non-FIFA nationality.

| No. | Pos. | Nation | Player |

Out: Note: Flags indicate national team as defined under FIFA eligibility rules; some limited exceptions apply. Players may hold more than one non-FIFA nationality.

| No. | Pos. | Nation | Player |

=== Żebbuġ Rangers ===
Manager: (Malta)

In: Note: Flags indicate national team as defined under FIFA eligibility rules; some limited exceptions apply. Players may hold more than one non-FIFA nationality.

| No. | Pos. | Nation | Player |

Out: Note: Flags indicate national team as defined under FIFA eligibility rules; some limited exceptions apply. Players may hold more than one non-FIFA nationality.

| No. | Pos. | Nation | Player |

=== Zejtun Corinthians ===
Manager: (Malta)

In: Note: Flags indicate national team as defined under FIFA eligibility rules; some limited exceptions apply. Players may hold more than one non-FIFA nationality.

| No. | Pos. | Nation | Player |
|---|---|---|---|
| — | DF | (Malta) MLT | Ian Azzopardi (from Senglea Athletic) |

Out: Note: Flags indicate national team as defined under FIFA eligibility rules; some limited exceptions apply. Players may hold more than one non-FIFA nationality.

| No. | Pos. | Nation | Player |
