= 2016 Club Universitario de Deportes season =

Universitario de Deportes
2016 season
- Manager: Roberto Chale
- Stadium: Estadio Monumental
- Peruvian Primera División: 3rd
- Copa Sudamericana: First stage
Home colours	Away colours

The 2016 season was Universitario de Deportes' 92nd season since its founding in 1924. The club played the Torneo Descentralizado and the Copa Sudamericana.

== Competitions ==
=== Descentralizado ===
==== Apertura ====
Pos	Team	Pld	W	D	L	GF	GA	GD	Pts	Qualification
1	Universitario	15	11	2	2	31	12	+19	35	Qualification to the 2017 Copa Sudamericana
2	Sporting Cristal	15	7	5	3	21	11	+10	26	
3	Alianza Lima	15	8	2	5	24	18	+6	26	

Results

Home \ Away	AAS	ALI	AYA	COM	MUN	JA	BOC	MEL	RGA	CRI	SHU	UCO	UCV	USM	UTC	UNI
Alianza Atlético																
Alianza Lima																1–2
Ayacucho																2–5
Comerciantes Unidos																
Deportivo Municipal																1–4
Juan Aurich																
Defensor La Bocana																
Melgar																
Real Garcilaso																1–0
Sporting Cristal																0–1
Sport Huancayo																0–0
Unión Comercio																
Universidad César Vallejo																0–2
Universidad San Martín																
UTC																
Universitario	3–1			2–0		2–2	3–0	1–3				1–0		2–0	3–1	

Updated to match(es) played on May 6, 2016. Source: ADFP - official fixture
Legend: Blue = home team win; Yellow = draw; Red = away team win.

==== Clausura ====
Pos	Team	Pld	W	D	L	GF	GA	GD	Pts	Qualification
1	Sporting Cristal	30	14	11	5	46	27	+19	53	
2	Universitario	30	15	6	9	51	39	+12	51	Advance to Liguilla B
3	Melgar	30	13	7	10	48	38	+10	46	

Results

Home \ Away	AAS	ALI	AYA	COM	MUN	JA	BOC	MEL	RGA	CRI	SHU	UCO	UCV	USM	UTC	UNI
Alianza Atlético																2–3
Alianza Lima																
Ayacucho																
Comerciantes Unidos																0–0
Deportivo Municipal																
Juan Aurich																2–0
Defensor La Bocana																2–2
Melgar																5–2
Real Garcilaso																
Sporting Cristal																
Sport Huancayo																
Unión Comercio																2–1
Universidad César Vallejo																
Universidad San Martín																3–1
UTC																2–1
Universitario		1–0	0–2		2–0				4–1	2–2	0–3		1–1			

Updated to match(es) played on 14 August 2016. Source: ADFP - official fixture
Legend: Blue = home team win; Yellow = draw; Red = away team win.

==== Liguilla B ====
Pos	Team	Pld	W	D	L	GF	GA	GD	Pts
1	Universitario	44	20	11	13	73	61	+12	72
2	Alianza Lima	44	19	9	16	56	44	+12	66
3	Comerciantes Unidos	44	17	12	15	64	53	+11	63

Results

Home \ Away	AAS	ALI	AYA	COM	SHU	USM	UTC	UNI
Alianza Atlético								1–3
Alianza Lima								3–0
Ayacucho								1–1
Comerciantes Unidos								1–1
Sport Huancayo								4–0
Universidad San Martín								4–4
UTC								1–1
Universitario	4–0	0–3	4–2	2–0	1–0	0–1	1–1	

Updated to match(es) played on 2016. Source: ADFP - official fixture
Legend: Blue = home team win; Yellow = draw; Red = away team win.

==== Semi-finals ====
November 30, 2016 First Leg	Universitario	1–2	Melgar	Nacional, Lima
20:00	John Galliquio 9'		58' José Carlos Fernández; 86' Bernardo Cuesta	Attendance: 27,438; Referee: Henry Gambetta

December 4, 2016 Second Leg	Melgar	2–2	Universitario	Virgen de Chapi, Arequipa
13:00	Omar Fernández 67'; Alexis Arias 77'		14' Diego Manicero; 33' Andy Polo	Attendance: 28,917; Referee: Diego Haro

==== Third place play-off ====
December 10, 2016	Universitario	3–2	Deportivo Municipal	Mansiche, Trujillo
15:00	Hernán Rengifo 33' 90'; Alexi Gómez 53'		Damián Ísmodes 64'; Velasco 77'	Attendance: 9,177; Referee: Luis Garay

=== Copa Sudamericana ===
==== First stage ====
9 August 2016	Universitario (Peru)	0–3	(Ecuador) Emelec	Estadio Nacional, Lima
21:30 UTC−5		Report	Achilier 52'; Stracqualursi 61', 80'	Referee: Wilson Lamouroux (Colombia)

16 August 2016	Emelec (Ecuador)	3–1	(Peru) Universitario	Estadio Christian Benítez Betancourt, Guayaquil
21:00 UTC−5	Giménez 22'; Stracqualursi 37' (pen.); Mena 68'	Report	Rengifo 32'	Referee: Raúl Orosco (Bolivia)
