= Oleksandr Musiyenko =

Ukrainian footballer

Personal information
- Full name: Oleksandr Oleksandrovych Musiyenko
- Date of birth: 7 April 1987 (age 39)
- Place of birth: Kyiv, Ukrainian SSR
- Height: 1.88 m (6 ft 2 in)
- Position: Goalkeeper

Youth career
- FC Stal Kyiv

Senior career*
Years	Team	Apps	(Gls)
2006	FC Borysfen Boryspil	13	(0)
2007–2008	FC Stal Dniprodzerzhynsk	22	(0)
2008	FC Prykarpattya Ivano-Frankivsk	1	(0)
2009–2010	FC Lviv	15	(0)
2009–2010	→FC Lviv-2	12	(0)
2011	FC Chornomorets Odesa	0	(0)
2011	→FC Chornomorets-2 Odesa	1	(0)
2011–2012	FC Bukovyna Chernivtsi	34	(0)
2012–2013	FC Metalurh Donetsk	0	(0)
2014	FC Obolon-Brovar Kyiv	9	(0)
2015	FC Nyva Ternopil	4	(0)
2015	Valletta F.C.	0	(0)
2015	FC Bukovyna Chernivtsi	5	(0)
2016	FC Poltava	3	(0)
2017–2019	FC Vorkuta	7	(0)
2021–	FC Continentals		
- * Club domestic league appearances and goals as of 17 November 2017

Oleksandr Oleksandrovych Musiyenko (Ukrainian: Олександр Олександрович Мусієнко; born 7 April 1987) is a Ukrainian footballer who plays as a goalkeeper for FC Continentals. He was also a goalkeeping coach for FC Podillya Khmelnytskyi.

== Career ==
=== Europe ===
Musiyenko was a product of the Stal Kyiv Sportive School System. He began his professional career in the Ukrainian First League with FC Borysfen Boryspil in 2006. After the bankruptcy of Boryspil, he signed with league rivals Stal Dniprodzerzhynsk the following season. In 2008, he played in the Western Ukraine region with FC Prykarpattia Ivano-Frankivsk after Stal was relegated.

Musiyenko signed with FC Lviv of the Ukrainian Premier League in 2009 but spent the majority of his time with the reserve team in the Ukrainian Second League. After a short stint in Lviv, he returned to the second division to play with Chornomorets Odesa. Odesa was promoted to the top tier but Musiyenko remained in the First League and signed with Bukovyna Chernivtsi in 2011. In 2012, he returned to the Premier League when he signed a contract with Metalurh Donetsk.

After failing to break into the first team with Donetsk he played in the third division in 2013 with FC Obolon Kyiv. He signed with Nyva Ternopil the following season. In 2015, he played abroad in the Maltese Premier League with Valletta F.C. Following a brief stint abroad he returned to his former club Bukovyna Chernivtsi for the remainder of the 2015 season. He was released from his contract following the conclusion of the season and returned to the second division in 2016 to play with FC Poltava.

=== Canada ===
He went abroad for the second time in his career in 2017 to play in the Canadian Soccer League with FC Vorkuta. In his debut season with Vorkuta, he assisted the club in clinching the First Division title. In his second season with Vorkuta, he assisted in securing the CSL Championship by defeating Scarborough SC in a penalty shootout. Musiyenko re-signed with Vorkuta for his third season in 2019 and assisted in securing the First Division title along with an undefeated streak throughout the regular season. In the opening round of the 2019 playoffs, the club was defeated by Kingsman SC in a penalty shootout.

In 2022, Vorkuta was renamed FC Continentals and he returned to the organization after a brief hiatus. His return match was against the Serbian White Eagles on May 29, 2022.

== Managerial career ==
Musiyenko was named the goalkeeping coach for FC Podillya Khmelnytskyi in 2021.

== Honors ==
FC Vorkuta

- CSL Championship: 2018
- Canadian Soccer League First Division: 2017, 2019
