= Nikola Ašćerić =

Serbian footballer

Personal information
- Full name: Nikola Ašćerić
- Date of birth: 19 April 1991 (age 35)
- Place of birth: Belgrade, SFR Yugoslavia
- Height: 1.96 m (6 ft 5 in)
- Position: Striker

Team information
- Current team: TWL Elektra
- Number: 14

Youth career
- Radnički Beograd
- Rad
- Red Star Belgrade

Senior career*
Years	Team	Apps	(Gls)
2009–2010	Radnički Beograd		
2010	Slavija Sarajevo	1	(0)
2011	SV Lackenbach	13	(5)
2011	Zemun	7	(1)
2012	Donji Srem	8	(0)
2012	Kastrioti Krujë	1	(0)
2013–2014	Grbalj	44	(17)
2015–2016	Radnički Niš	32	(5)
2016	Vojvodina	26	(6)
2017	Tokushima Vortis	6	(0)
2017	Valletta	5	(1)
2018	Lamia	4	(0)
2018	Al-Qaisumah		
2019	GAIS	14	(4)
2019	Mačva Šabac	16	(1)
2020	Persik Kediri	2	(0)
2020–2021	Masfout	7	(1)
2021	Bačka	8	(2)
2021	Radnički Beograd	2	(0)
2022–2023	USC Muckendorf/Zeiselmauer	29	(14)
2023	Grafenwörth USC	2	(1)
2024	SV Gablitz		(0)
2024	ASV Schrems	15	(7)
2025	ASV Siegendorf	14	(1)
2025	SV Stockerau	12	(0)
2026–	TWL Elektra	7	(1)
- * Club domestic league appearances and goals as of 28 June 2026

Nikola Ašćerić (Serbian Cyrillic: Никола Ашћерић; born 19 April 1991) is a Serbian professional footballer who plays as a striker for TWL Elektra.
