= Rodolfo Soares =

Brazilian footballer

Personal information
- Full name: Rodolfo dos Santos Soares
- Date of birth: May 20, 1985 (age 41)
- Place of birth: Rio de Janeiro, Brazil
- Height: 1.87 m (6 ft 1 1/2 in)
- Position: Defender

Team information
- Current team: St. Andrews
- Number: 8

Youth career
- 2001–2002: Fluminense

Senior career*
Years	Team	Apps	(Gls)
2003–2006	Fluminense	6	(0)
2006–2007	→ Joinville (loan)	1	(0)
2007	Vejle	5	(0)
2007–2009	Al Kharaitiyat		
2009–2010	Al-Ahed		
2010	Canoas	9	(1)
2011	São Raimundo		(2)
2011–2018	Hibernians	178	(17)
2014	→ Al-Ahed (loan)	10	(0)
2018–2020	Gżira United	42	(2)
2020–2021	Nadur Youngsters	0	(0)
2021-2022	Gudja United	23	(0)
2022–2023	Hibernians	12	(0)
2023	St Lucia	9	(1)
2023–2024	Żabbar St. Patrick	22	(1)
2024–	St. Andrews	37	(1)
- * Club domestic league appearances and goals as of 21 April 2026

Rodolfo dos Santos Soares, or simply Rodolfo Soares (born May 20, 1985) is a Brazilian football who plays as a defender for Maltese club St. Andrews.

== Club career ==
On 12 May 2018, he signed a two-year contract with Gżira United.
