= Thomas Veronese =

Italian footballer

Personal information
- Date of birth: 2 November 1986 (age 40)
- Place of birth: Mestre, Italy
- Height: 1.78 m (5 ft 10 in)
- Position: Left-back

Team information
- Current team: Mqabba
- Number: 21

Youth career
- –2004: Venezia

Senior career*
Years	Team	Apps	(Gls)
2004–2005	Belluno	18	(0)
2005–2006	Trento	24	(0)
2006–2009	Südtirol	86	(0)
2009–2011	Bassano Virtus	44	(0)
2012	Montichiari		
2012–2013	St. Georgen	26	(2)
2013	Mezzocorona	15	(0)
2013–2014	Calcio Marano	11	(0)
2015–2016	Trento		
2016–2017	Mestre	19	(0)
2017–2018	Mosta	25	(0)
2018–2019	Gzira United	11	(0)
2019–2020	Tarxien Rainbows	21	(2)
2021	Gudja United	5	(0)
2021–	Mqabba	19	(0)

International career
2006	Italy U20 C	3	(0)
- * Club domestic league appearances and goals as of 15:50, 26 February 2022 (UTC)

Thomas Veronese (born 2 November 1986) is an Italian professional footballer playing for Mqabba in the Maltese BOV Challenge League.

== Club career ==
Veronese played youth football with Venezia F.C.

He joined St. Georgen in 2012. In 2013 he signed for A.C. Mezzocorona.

It has been reported that Veronese once moved without advising his previous club, with the A.C. Trento S.C.S.D. management learning about his departure from his new club's website, A.C. Mestre. Mestre is Veronese's hometown team.

Thomas Veronese joined Mosta in 2017. Veronese was an important player for Mosta throughout season 2017–18. He showed excellent displays and was already targeted by clubs such as Gzira United F.C. half-way through the season in January 2018. He was eventually signed by Gzira United F.C. in their bid to bolster their defence prior to Europa League commitments.

Veronese debuted for Gzira in the UEFA Europa League against Andorran UE Sant Julià.

== International career ==
Veronese has appeared for the Italy U20 C.
