= Maxim Focșa =

Moldovan footballer

Personal information
- Date of birth: 21 April 1992 (age 34)
- Place of birth: Chișinău, Moldova
- Height: 1.80 m (5 ft 11 in)
- Position: Centre-back

Team information
- Current team: Bălți
- Number: 4

Senior career*
Years	Team	Apps	(Gls)
2010–2012	Sheriff-2 Tiraspol	42	(9)
2012	Dinamo-Auto Tiraspol	15	(1)
2013–2014	Academia Chișinău	50	(3)
2015	Dinamo-Auto Tiraspol	7	(0)
2015–2016	Valletta	0	(0)
2015–2016	→ Balzan (loan)	20	(1)
2016–2017	Petrocub Hîncești	16	(0)
2017–2018	Zaria Bălți	23	(0)
2018–2019	Pembroke Athleta	10	(0)
2019–2020	Sfântul Gheorghe	21	(1)
2020	Ma'an	1	(0)
2020–2021	Sfântul Gheorghe	23	(0)
2021	Slutsk	4	(0)
2022	Dordoi Bishkek	10	(2)
2022–2023	Dacia Buiucani	13	(2)
2023–2024	Afif		
2024–2026	Dacia Buiucani	46	(8)
2026–	Bălți	10	(1)

International career
2019	Moldova	1	(0)
- * Club domestic league appearances and goals as of 1 June 2026

Maxim Focșa (born 21 April 1992) is a Moldovan footballer who plays as a defender for Moldovan Liga club Bălți.

== Club career ==
In 2018, Focșa played for Maltese club Pembroke Athleta.

On 4 March 2022, Dordoi Bishkek announced the signing of Focșa.

On 24 May 2023, Afif announced the signing of Focșa.

== International career ==
He made his debut for the Moldova national team on 17 November 2019 in a Euro 2020 qualifier against Iceland.
