= Luxol Stadium =

Stadium in Pembroke, Malta

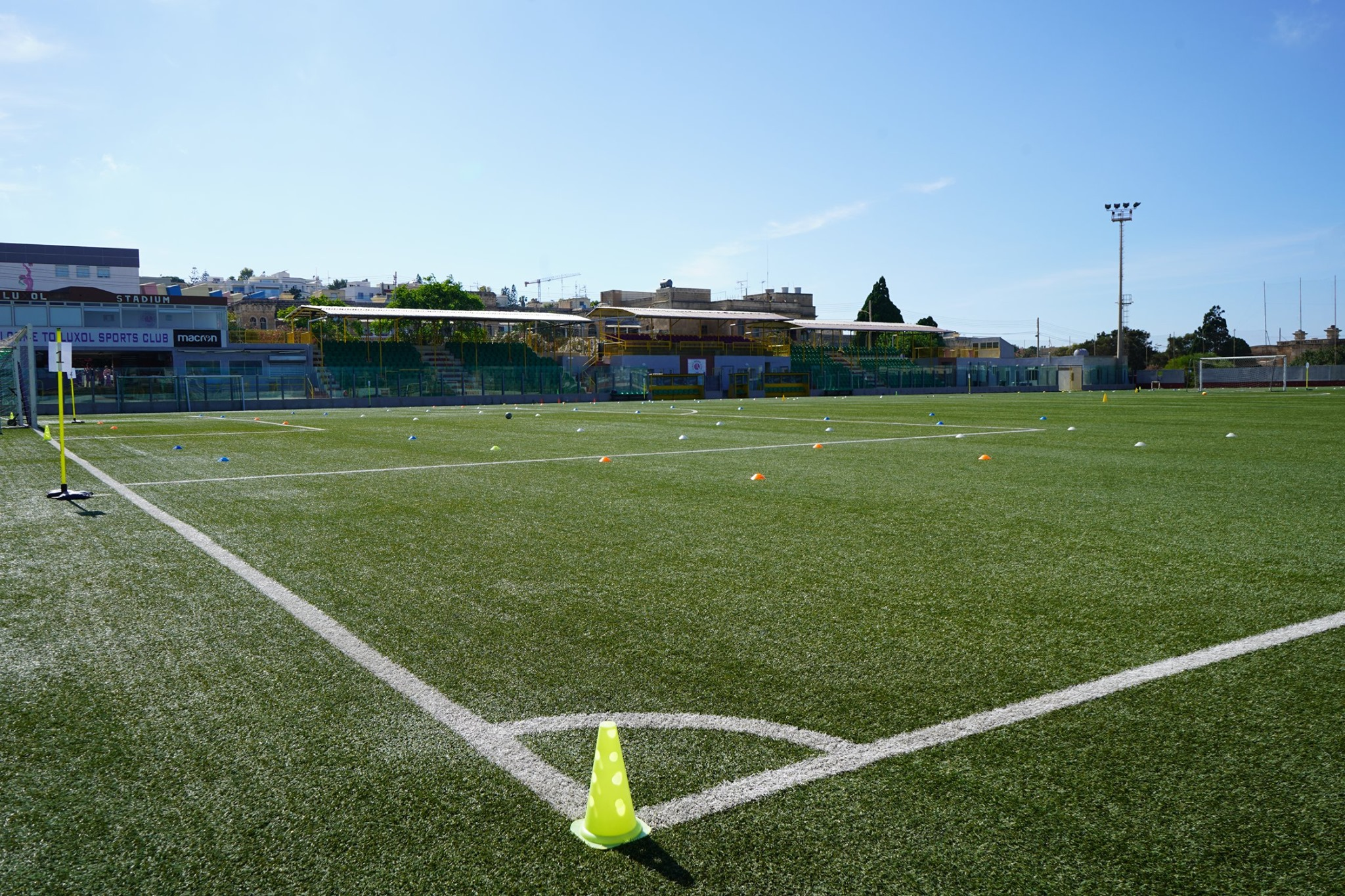
- Interactive map of Luxol Stadium
- Location: Pembroke, Malta
- Coordinates: 35°55′26″N 14°28′31″E
- Owner: St. Andrews F.C.
- Operator: St. Andrews F.C.
- Capacity: 702
- Surface: Artificial Turf

Construction
- Opened: May 2006 (Artificial Turf)

Tenants
- St. Andrews F.C. (Not in the Maltese Premier League and Maltese Challenge League); Maltese National Amateur League

Website
- https://www.luxolsportsclub.com/

The Luxol Stadium is a stadium in Pembroke, Malta, opened on 26 May 2006. It was built at a cost of Lm 350,000 with an artificial turf surface and floodlighting. It is the home ground of Maltese football club St. Andrews F.C., who currently play in the Maltese FA Trophy, Maltese Second Division and Maltese Third Division. It is used for matches from the Maltese FA Trophy, Maltese Third Division, Maltese Second Division and even Exhibition game. It is also used by all the St. Andrews F.C. teams from the youth teams up until the senior teams for training. It holds 800 people on the stadium.
