= Santiago Malano =

Argentine footballer

Personal information
- Full name: Santiago Malano
- Date of birth: 29 January 1987 (age 39)
- Place of birth: Mercedes, Buenos Aires, Argentina
- Height: 1.78 m (5 ft 10 in)
- Position: Forward

Youth career
- Estudiantes de Mercedes
- Racing Club

Senior career*
Years	Team	Apps	(Gls)
2005–2010	Racing Club	23	(1)
2008–2009	→ Atlético Rafaela (loan)	30	(5)
2011	Cúcuta Deportivo	14	(4)
2011–2013	Audax Italiano	30	(1)
2013	Audax Italiano B	14	(5)
2013–2015	Deportes Temuco	64	(26)
2015–2016	Rangers	32	(8)
2016–2021	Valletta	84	(13)
2021–2022	Nuova Florida	32	(1)

International career
2005	Argentina U20		
- * Club domestic league appearances and goals as of 24 April 2024

Santiago Malano (born 29 January 1987) is an Argentinian footballer.

== Career ==
A product of Racing Club de Avellaneda, Malano played for them and Atlético Rafaela in his homeland.

In Colombia, he played for Cúcuta Deportivo in 2011.

In Chile he played for Audax Italiano, Audax Italiano B, Deportes Temuco and Rangers.

In the Maltese Premier League, he played for Valletta.

His last club was Nuova Florida in the 2021–22 Serie D.

As a youth player of Racing Club, he represented the Argentina national U20 team.

== Personal life ==
Malano holds Italian citizenship.
