= Dyson Falzon =

Maltese footballer

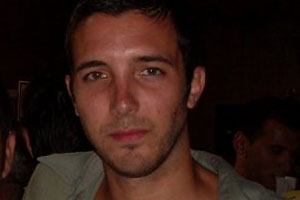

Personal information
- Full name: Dyson Falzon Bugeja
- Date of birth: 9 March 1986 (age 40)
- Place of birth: Buġibba, Malta
- Position: Midfielder

Youth career
- Mosta

Senior career*
Years	Team	Apps	(Gls)
2001–2006	Mosta	44	(5)
2006–2016	Valletta	106	(14)
2010–2011	→ Hamrun Spartans (loan)	12	(4)
2012	→ Mosta (loan)	10	(0)
2014	→ Mosta (loan)	2	(0)
2014–2015	→ Mosta (loan)	24	(0)
2015–2016	→ Mosta (loan)	23	(2)
2016–2017	Gżira United	9	(0)
2017–2018	Mqabba	6	(0)

International career
- Malta U17
- Malta U19
- Malta U21
2006	Malta	1	(0)
- * Club domestic league appearances and goals

Dyson Falzon (born 9 March 1986) is a professional footballer who plays as a midfielder.

Falzon has also earned one cap for Malta, appearing in a 3–0 loss to Slovakia on 15 August 2006.

== Honours ==
Valletta

- Maltese Premier League: 2007–08
