= Federico Falcone =

Argentine footballer (born 1990)

Personal information
- Full name: Federico Matías Falcone
- Date of birth: 21 February 1990 (age 36)
- Place of birth: Rosario, Argentina
- Height: 1.85 m (6 ft 1 in)
- Position: Centre forward

Team information
- Current team: Hibernians
- Number: 20

Youth career
- 2005–2009: Newell's Old Boys

Senior career*
Years	Team	Apps	(Gls)
2009–2012	Newell's Old Boys	10	(0)
2012	→ La Serena (loan)	13	(4)
2012–2013	Huachipato	24	(3)
2014	Barnechea	3	(0)
2014–2015	Rangers	32	(8)
2015–2016	Valletta	42	(21)
2016–2017	Terengganu	12	(3)
2017–2018	Aves	7	(1)
2018–2019	Boavista	23	(4)
2019–2022	Birkirkara	71	(25)
2022–2024	Valletta	32	(11)
2024–	Hibernians	26	(6)
- * Club domestic league appearances and goals as of 26 June 2025

Federico Matías Falcone (born 21 February 1990 in Rosario, Santa Fe) is an Argentine professional footballer who plays for Maltese club Hibernians as a centre forward.
