= Henry Bonello =

Maltese international footballer

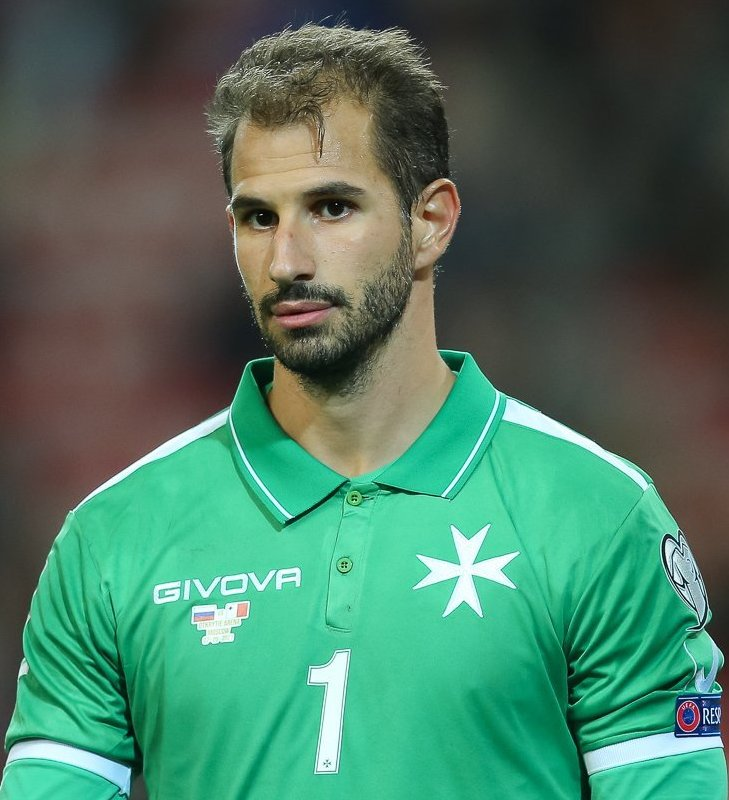
- Bonello with Malta in 2021

Personal information
- Date of birth: 13 October 1988 (age 38)
- Place of birth: Pietà, Malta
- Height: 1.86 m (6 ft 1 in)
- Position: Goalkeeper

Team information
- Current team: Sliema Wanderers

Senior career*
Years	Team	Apps	(Gls)
2006–2014	Sliema Wanderers	100	(0)
2009–2010	→ Vittoriosa Stars (loan)	1	(0)
2014–2015	Hibernians	30	(0)
2015–2017	Valletta	32	(0)
2017	Birkirkara	17	(0)
2017–2021	Valletta	84	(0)
2021–2026	Ħamrun Spartans	119	(1)
2026–	Sliema Wanderers	6	(0)

International career^{‡}
2012–	Malta	78	(0)
- * Club domestic league appearances and goals as of 17:24, 20 October 2026 (UTC) ‡ National team caps and goals as of 19:35, 18 November 2026 (UTC)

Henry Bonello (born 13 October 1988) is a Maltese professional footballer who plays as a goalkeeper for Sliema Wanderers and the Malta national team.

== Club career ==
Born in Pietà, Bonello has played club football for Sliema Wanderers, Vittoriosa Stars, Hibernians and Valletta. In a match for Sliema Wanderers on 29 January 2012, Bonello was described as a "hero" for his performance. He signed for Birkirkara in January 2017, with Rowen Muscat making the move in the opposite direction. He returned to Valletta in June 2017. He signed for Ħamrun Spartans in July 2021. He then rejoined the club that started his career, Sliema Wanderers in July 2026.

== International career ==
He made his senior international debut for Malta on 29 February 2012, in the 2–1 win over Liechtenstein. On 23 March 2019, he saved a penalty in the 2–1 win over Faroe Islands in a UEFA Euro 2020 qualifier, as Malta won their first competitive home match in 13 years.

== Personal life ==
His father John was an international player as well and was the national team's goalkeeper in the infamous December 1983 European Championship qualification defeat by Spain, which Malta lost 1–12.
