= St. Andrews F.C. (Malta) =

Association football club in Malta

St. Andrews
- Full name: St. Andrews Football Club
- Nicknames: Luxol, The Saints
- Founded: 1968; 58 years ago (as Luxol St. Andrews)
- Ground: Luxol Stadium
- Capacity: 800
- Chairman: Jason Falzon
- President: Nigel Dunkerley
- Manager: Marko Rajic
- League: Maltese Challenge League
- 2022–23: Maltese Challenge League, 9th
Home colours	Away colours

St. Andrews Football Club - commonly known as Luxol, are a Maltese football club from the town of St. Andrew's, Pembroke, which currently plays in the Maltese Challenge League.

== History ==
St. Andrews F.C was founded in 1968 as Luxol St. Andrew's. It is reputed for its highly organised football nursery, which has produced a number of talented players over the years. The senior team competes in the Maltese Premier League, after promotion from the First Division. The club is part of a multi-sports club, called Luxol Sports Club. Their former coaches include Ally Dawson, who was an ex-Rangers captain. The Luxol St. Andrews futsal team is one of the top futsal teams in Malta at the moment, and plays in Malta's top futsal division. St. Andrews currently play out of the newly refurbished Luxol Stadium, one of the most modern grounds on the island.

== Players ==
=== Current squad ===
As of 1 March 2026

Note: Flags indicate national team as defined under FIFA eligibility rules; some limited exceptions apply. Players may hold more than one non-FIFA nationality.

No.	Pos.	Nation	Player
1	GK	MLT	Sebastian Mifsud
2	DF	MLT	Matthew Muscat
3	DF	MLT	Clay Tanti
4	MF	MLT	Dale Camilleri
5	DF	MLT	Matthew Bonnici
7	FW	BRA	Taylon Correa
8	DF	BRA	Rodolfo Soares
9	DF	MLT	Marcelo Dias
10	FW	MLT	Gianluca Cauchi
11	MF	BRA	Cauã
13	MF	GHA	Michael Zuo
14	MF	MLT	Jack Camilleri
15	DF	MLT	Liam Scicluna

No.	Pos.	Nation	Player
16	MF	MLT	Nicholas Galea
17	MF	MLT	Kurt Briffa
18	FW	MKD	Andrej Nakov
19	MF	MLT	Bradley Sciberras
20	FW	ENG	Addis Dore
21	DF	MLT	Ben Gaerty
22	MF	BRA	Elizeu
23	MF	MLT	Ethan Brincat Winters
24	FW	GHA	Jeff Sowah
26	GK	MLT	Jake Pisani
32	DF	MLT	Michael Johnson
-	GK	MLT	Nicholas Grima

=== Under-19 squad ===
Managing the under-19 squad will be Michael Woods and with his Assistant Liam Mangion.

Note: Flags indicate national team as defined under FIFA eligibility rules; some limited exceptions apply. Players may hold more than one non-FIFA nationality.

No.	Pos.	Nation	Player
2	DF	MLT	Luca Zammit
3	DF	MLT	Miguel Dean Xuereb
4	DF	MLT	Sebastian Agius
10	MF	MLT	Luca Spiteri
7	MF	MLT	Andy Borg
14	FW	MLT	Matteo Fenech
15	DF	MLT	Nick Galea

No.	Pos.	Nation	Player
9	FW	MLT	Zane Falzon
6	MF	MLT	Kane Arpa
14	MF	MLT	Liam Cutajar
12	MF	MLT	Jake Parnis
17	FW	MLT	Matthias Ellul
—	DF	MLT	Ruslan Borg
11	MF	MLT	Sean Ellul
—	MF	MLT	Liam Hudson
—	MF	MLT	Jordan Kelly
