= Ryan Camilleri =

Maltese international footballer

Personal information
- Date of birth: 22 May 1988 (age 38)
- Place of birth: Pietà, Malta
- Height: 1.78 m (5 ft 10 in)
- Position: Right back

Senior career*
Years	Team	Apps	(Gls)
2004–2009	Pietà Hotspurs	31	(1)
2009–2014	Hibernians	107	(1)
2014–2023	Valletta	185	(1)

International career^{‡}
2012–2018	Malta	39	(0)
- * Club domestic league appearances and goals as of 25 June 2023 ‡ National team caps and goals as of 14:10, 1 January 2020 (UTC)

Ryan Camilleri (born 22 May 1988) is a Maltese international footballer who plays for as a right back.

== Career ==
Born in Pietà, Camilleri has played club football for Pietà Hotspurs, Hibernians and Valletta.

He made his international debut for Malta in 2012.
