= Jean Borg =

Maltese footballer

Personal information
- Date of birth: 8 January 1998 (age 28)
- Position: Left back

Team information
- Current team: Sliema Wanderers
- Number: 2

Senior career*
Years	Team	Apps	(Gls)
2014–2023	Valletta	142	(5)
2023	Fidelis Andria	14	(0)
2023–	Sliema Wanderers	86	(1)

International career^{‡}
2014	Malta U17	6 (Note: Appearances in UEFA matches only)	(0)
2014–2016	Malta U19	9	(0)
2016–2018	Malta U21	12	(1)
2018–	Malta	34	(0)
- * Club domestic league appearances and goals as of 18 May 2026 ‡ National team caps and goals as of 17:54, 27 September 2026 (UTC)

Jean Borg (born 8 January 1998) is a Maltese footballer who plays as a left back for Maltese Premier League club Sliema Wanderers and the Malta national team.

== Club career ==
He has played club football for Valletta.

On 20 January 2023, Borg signed with Fidelis Andria in the Italian third-tier Serie C.

== International career ==
He made his international debut for Malta in 2018.
