= Maximiliano Velasco =

Argentine footballer

Personal information
- Full name: Maximiliano Alejandro Velasco
- Date of birth: 19 June 1990 (age 36)
- Place of birth: Villa María, Argentina
- Height: 1.79 m (5 ft 10 in)
- Position: Forward

Team information
- Current team: Deportivo Llacuabamba
- Number: 32

Youth career
- –2010: Newell's Old Boys

Senior career*
Years	Team	Apps	(Gls)
2010–2012	Newell's Old Boys	4	(0)
2012–2013	Talleres	18	(6)
2013–2014	Sportivo Belgrano	31	(4)
2014	San Martín Tucumán	11	(5)
2015	Universidad San Martín	26	(9)
2016–2017	Deportivo Municipal	40	(14)
2017	Valletta	11	(9)
2018	Sport Boys	35	(10)
2019	Guabirá	21	(2)
2019	César Vallejo	12	(0)
2020–	Deportivo Llacuabamba	20	(3)
- * Club domestic league appearances and goals as of 20:19, 11 November 2020 (UTC)

Maximiliano Alejandro Velasco (born 19 June 1990) is an Argentine football player. He plays for Deportivo Llacuabamba in the Peruvian Primera División.

== Club career ==
He made his Argentine Primera División debut for Newell's Old Boys on 11 June 2011 in a game against Olimpo.
