= Llywelyn Cremona =

Maltese footballer (born 1995)

Personal information
- Date of birth: 7 May 1995 (age 31)
- Place of birth: Pietà, Malta
- Position: Attacking midfielder

Team information
- Current team: Valletta
- Number: 30

Youth career
- 1999–2011: Valletta

Senior career*
Years	Team	Apps	(Gls)
2011–2017	Valletta	97	(7)
2017–2020	Birkirkara	9	(0)
2019–2020	→ Gudja United (loan)	36	(0)
2020–2022	Gudja United	24	(3)
2022–	Valletta	11	(0)

International career^{‡}
	Malta U17	3	(0)
	Malta U19	7	(0)
2014	Malta U21	1	(0)
2015–	Malta	2	(0)
- * Club domestic league appearances and goals as of 15:03, 4 June 2023 (UTC) ‡ National team caps and goals as of 15:03, 4 June 2023 (UTC)

Llywelyn Cremona (born 7 May 1995) is a Maltese professional footballer who plays as an attacking midfielder or second striker for Maltese Premier League side Valletta.

== Club career ==
Cremona was part of the Valletta F.C. youth nursery from 1999 to 2011, playing important part in the capital city youth sides. He made his debut in 2011 for the senior Valletta side, however he was part of the senior squad as from 2007.

During his time as part of the senior Valletta squad, he won 5 honours, 2 of which were a Double, in 2013–14. These were 4 Maltese Premier League trophies in (2007-08, 2011-12, 2013-14, 2015-16) and 1 Maltese FA Trophy: 2013-14.

On 4 July 2017, Birkirkara made a signed Cremona from rivals Valletta. Valletta F.C. also confirmed the news on their website. Cremona signed for The Stripes for 3 seasons. Cremona was banned for match-fixing in January 2018 for one year.

When Cremona went back from the suspension in January 2019, he was loaned out to Gudja United for the rest of the season.

== International career ==
Cremona featured in the Malta national under-17 football team and the Malta national under-19 football team. He also featured in the Malta national under-21 football team under Silvio Vella, making his debut on 5 September 2014.

Cremona was called up to the Malta senior national team for the first time on 29 September 2014. He made his official debut on 12 November 2015 under Pietro Ghedin.

== Honours ==
=== Club ===
- Maltese Premier League: 2007-08, 2011-12, 2013-14, 2015-16
- Maltese FA Trophy: 2013-14
