= Ian Azzopardi =

Maltese footballer

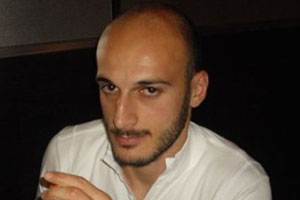

Personal information
- Full name: Ian Azzopardi
- Date of birth: 12 August 1982 (age 44)
- Place of birth: Zejtun, Malta
- Height: 6 ft 0 in (1.83 m)
- Position: Left back

Team information
- Current team: Senglea Athletic
- Number: 3

Senior career*
Years	Team	Apps	(Gls)
2000–2007	Floriana	112	(4)
2007–2010	Sliema Wanderers	73	(3)
2010–2017	Valletta	148	(5)
2017	→ Gżira United (loan)	13	(1)
2017–	Senglea Athletic	5	(0)

International career
- Malta U16
- Malta U18
- Malta U21
2003–2009	Malta	41	(1)
- * Club domestic league appearances and goals as of 29 December 2017

Ian Azzopardi (born 12 August 1982 in Zejtun, Malta) is a Maltese footballer who currently plays for Maltese Premier League side Senglea Athletic, where he plays as a defender.

== Playing career ==
=== Floriana ===
Ian Azzopardi began his career with Floriana as a trainee, and made his debut for Floriana during the 2000–01 season. Azzopardi notched up just two appearances, but failed to score any goals, as he helped his side to a 5th-place finish in the Maltese Premier League.

Ian went into the 2001–02 season in search of more first team football, as he hoped to break into the first team; however the season turned out to be a carbon copy of the previous one, with Azzopardi again making two appearances and scoring no goals, as Floriana finished in 6th position in the Maltese Premier League.

For the 2002–03 season, Azzopardi established himself as the club's first-team left back, and even forced his way into the Maltese international football team. Ian made a total of 20 appearances during the season, but again failed to find the net, as Floriana recorded a 7th-place finish in the Maltese Premier League.

During the 2003–04 season, Azzopardi made 26 league appearances without scoring as Floriana finished fifth in the Maltese Premier League.

For the 2004–05 season, Azzopardi had firmly cemented the left back position as his own, as he made 22 appearances and even scored his first league goal, but Floriana finished one worse than the previous season with a 6th-place finish in the Maltese Premier League.

Azzopardi went into the 2005–06 season looking to try to achieve some glory with Floriana, but the team went on to finish in 7th position. Ian made 18 appearances, but managed to notch two goals to help the team's cause.

For the 2006–07 season, Azzopardi continued his good form, but again Floriana could only manage another 7th-place finish, with Azzopardi making 22 appearances and scoring one goal.

=== Sliema Wanderers ===
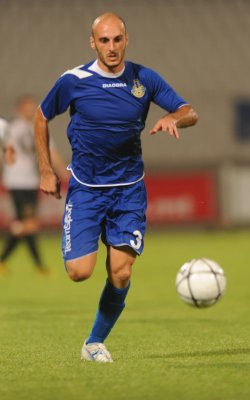
Ian Azzopardi in action for Sliema Wanderers.

With Floriana continually failing to seriously challenge some of their biggest rivals in Maltese football, Ian Azzopardi decided in June 2007, to move onto Sliema Wanderers following the end of his Floriana contract.

Azzopardi began his Sliema Wanderers career at the start of the 2007–08 season. Ian very quickly established himself as the club's regular first team left back. In his first season Ian made a total of 21 appearances but failed to score any goals, as Sliema Wanderers recorded a 3rd-place finish in the Maltese Premier League.

Ian's second season (2008–09) with Sliema Wanderers was even more productive, as Ian made 24 appearances and scored his first goal for the club, and although Sliema Wanderers finished one position lower in 4th, than the previous season, Azzopardi got his hands on his first piece of silverware as Sliema Wanderers defeated Valletta to win the U*Bet FA Trophy.

For the 2009–10 season, Ian had competition in the left back position, following the signing of Clayton Failla from Hibernians. Ian scored his first goal of the season on 24 January 2010, as he added his team's third goal, in a 3–1 victory over Dingli Swallows.

–

== International career ==
=== Malta ===
Azzopardi received his first cap for Malta on 14 December 2003 in a match against Poland.

Ian scored his first goal, and the opening goal on 20 August 2008, in a 1–2 defeat to Estonia in a Friendly match.

On 9 September 2009, Azzopardi scored an own goal in the 2010 FIFA World Cup qualifier against Sweden, which Malta went on to lose 1–0.

== Career statistics ==
=== Club ===
Statistics accurate as of match played 1 August 2009.

Club performance			League		Cup		League Cup		Continental		Total	
Season	Club	League	Apps	Goals	Apps	Goals	Apps	Goals	Apps	Goals	Apps	Goals
Malta			League		Maltese FA Trophy		League Cup		Europe		Total	
2000–01	Floriana	Maltese Premier League	2	0	0	0	0	0	0	0	2	0
2001–02	Floriana	Maltese Premier League	2	0	0	0	0	0	0	0	2	0
2002–03	Floriana	Maltese Premier League	20	0	0	0	0	0	0	0	20	0
2003–04	Floriana	Maltese Premier League	26	0	0	0	0	0	0	0	26	0
2004–05	Floriana	Maltese Premier League	22	1	0	0	0	0	0	0	22	1
2005–06	Floriana	Maltese Premier League	18	2	0	0	0	0	0	0	18	2
2006–07	Floriana	Maltese Premier League	22	1	0	0	0	0	0	0	22	1
2007–08	Sliema Wanderers	Maltese Premier League	21	0	0	0	0	0	0	0	21	0
2008–09	Sliema Wanderers	Maltese Premier League	24	1	0	0	0	0	0	0	24	1
2009–10	Sliema Wanderers	Maltese Premier League	28	2	0	0	0	0	0	0	28	2
2010–11	Valletta	Maltese Premier League	0	0	0	0	0	0	0	0	0	0
Total	Malta		185	7	0	0	0	0	0	0	185	7
Career total			185	7	0	0	0	0	0	0	185	7

=== International ===
Appearances and goals by national team and year
National team	Year	Apps	Goals
Malta	2003	1	0
Malta	2004	9	0
Malta	2005	3	0
Malta	2006	6	0
Malta	2007	11	0
Malta	2008	6	1
Malta	2009	5	0
Total		41	1

Scores and results list Malta's goal tally first, score column indicates score after each Azzopardi goal.

List of international goals scored by Ian Azzopardi
No.	Date	Venue	Opponent	Score	Result	Competition
1	20 August 2008	A. Le Coq Arena, Tallinn, Estonia	Estonia	1–1	1–2	Friendly

== Honours ==
=== Sliema Wanderers ===
Winner

- 2009 Maltese FA Trophy
