= Michael Mifsud =

Maltese footballer

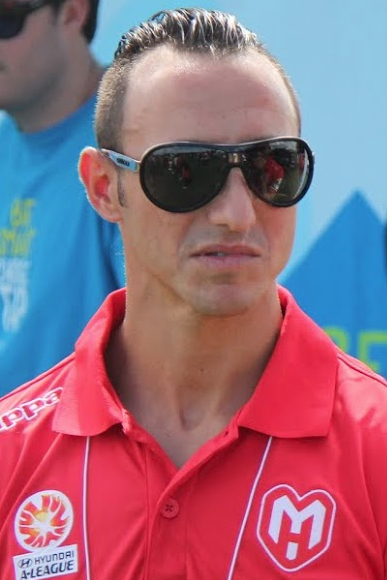
- Mifsud with Melbourne Heart in 2013

Personal information
- Full name: Michael Mifsud
- Date of birth: 17 April 1981 (age 45)
- Place of birth: Pietà, Malta
- Height: 1.64 m (5 ft 5 in)
- Position: Striker

Youth career
- Sliema Wanderers

Senior career*
Years	Team	Apps	(Gls)
1997–2001	Sliema Wanderers	80	(60)
2001–2004	Kaiserslautern	21	(2)
2001–2004	→ Kaiserslautern II	47	(27)
2004	Sliema Wanderers	12	(8)
2004–2007	Lillestrøm	48	(17)
2007–2009	Coventry City	86	(16)
2009	→ Barnsley (loan)	15	(2)
2010	Valletta	7	(7)
2011	Qormi	5	(7)
2011–2013	Valletta	49	(28)
2013–2014	Melbourne Heart	14	(1)
2014–2016	Sliema Wanderers	32	(5)
2016–2018	Valletta	55	(11)
2018–2020	Birkirkara	36	(7)
2020–2021	Sirens	9	(1)
2021–2022	Mosta	24	(3)
Total		540	(202)

International career
2000–2020	Malta	143	(42)
- * Club domestic league appearances and goals

Michael Mifsud (born 17 April 1981) is a Maltese former professional footballer. He scored 42 goals in 143 games for the Malta national team between 2000 and 2020, and also captained the side. He was voted Maltese Sportsperson of the Year in 2001 and 2003. He played for Kaiserslautern, Lillestrom and Coventry City, as well as several teams in the Maltese Premier League.

== Playing career ==
=== Sliema Wanderers ===
Born in Pietà, Mifsud is a youth product of Sliema Wanderers. He made his debut during the 1997–98 season. In his first season, Mifsud made six appearances and scored once, helping Sliema Wanderers to a third-place finish in the Maltese Premier League.

The 1998–99 season saw Mifsud make the breakthrough and become a first-team regular. He was quickly becoming one of the hottest properties in Maltese football. He made 23 appearances and scored eight goals, as Sliema Wanderers again recorded a third-place finish in the Maltese Premier League.

Mifsud's form the previous season led to a trial with English giants Manchester United in July 1999. However, the trial did not lead to a permanent move and Mifsud returned to Sliema Wanderers for the 1999–2000 season. The failure to secure the move to Manchester United did not affect Mifsud, who was in fine goalscoring form for Sliema Wanderers, netting 21 times in 28 outings. The club finished in fourth position in the Maltese Premier League that season.

With interest in Mifsud growing, the 2000–01 season proved to be his last with the club. Mifsud helped the club to a second-place finish in the Maltese Premier League, making 25 appearances and scoring an impressive 20 goals.

=== Kaiserslautern ===
His form earned him his first call-up to the national team, and this alerted the Bundesliga club 1. FC Kaiserslautern to his potential and he signed for the club in the summer of 2001. He was a regular scorer with the B team in the Regionalliga which was the third league in Germany back then, he also made some appearances for the senior team in the Bundesliga, scoring two goals.

=== Sliema Wanderers (second spell) ===
Mifsud failed to make the grade with Kaiserslautern A team and his wish for regular first-team football meant he was released in the winter of 2004. He re-signed for Sliema Wanderers for the remainder of the 2004–05 season. Mifsud went on to make 12 appearances and score eight goals, helping Sliema Wanderers to retain the Maltese Premier League title.

=== Lillestrøm ===
In the summer of 2005, he was snapped up by Norwegian Premier League club Lillestrøm, where he was at one stage voted the best foreign player in the league. He was the club's top scorer in the 2006 season with 11 goals in 19 appearances.

On 5 November 2006, the last day of the Norwegian League, he declared that he had set his heart on a move to one of the top European leagues. The previous summer, Lillestrøm had turned down an offer for Mifsud from English club Coventry City despite knowing that the striker would be able to move for free in January 2007 as his contract was due to run out at the end of December.

He declined to renew his contract with Lillestrøm to fulfil his wish to turn out for a club in a major European league.

=== Coventry City ===
Mifsud was spotted by the ex-manager of Coventry City, Micky Adams, as he was looking for new strikers in Norway. On 10 January 2007, Mifsud signed a two-and-a-half-year deal with Coventry City in the Football League Championship in England. However, Adams was sacked two days later. Mifsud made his début for Coventry City on 13 January 2007 in a Football League Championship match at home to Crystal Palace.

Mifsud scored his first goal for Coventry City on 22 January 2007, after coming on as a substitute in an away game against Plymouth Argyle. He then scored his second goal for Coventry in 4–1 defeat of Barnsley. He also scored at Turf Moor on 6 May 2007 against Burnley. During another impressive display, he scored a goal against Sheffield Wednesday and won the goal of the season for Coventry City.

In the third round of the 2007–08 League Cup, on 26 September 2007, Mifsud scored two goals to give Coventry City an unexpected 2–0 victory over Premier League champions Manchester United, his boyhood team, at Old Trafford. La Gazzetta dello Sport nicknamed him as Il Messi di Malta after the match.

After this success, Mifsud continued to excel. He was instrumental in Coventry City's draw with Charlton Athletic on 29 September 2007, scoring his third goal in two games. On 2 October 2007, Coventry City secured a 3–1 league win against Blackpool, the second goal again coming from Mifsud. In this same match, Mifsud was fouled in the box and the resultant penalty was scored by Coventry City's Michael Doyle. Furthermore, Blackpool's Kaspars Gorkšs was shown the red card for a foul on Dele Adebola, after a Mifsud through ball.

On 12 November, Mifsud was sent off after 11 minutes of a Midlands derby against West Bromwich Albion, after elbowing Carl Hoefkens in the face. Mifsud later apologised for the elbow on Hoefkens. On 4 December, Mifsud returned from his three-match ban to face West Bromwich Albion again. Mifsud scored two goals and increasing his tally to 15 goals for the season with the Sky Blues.

On 5 January 2008, Mifsud scored two goals in the FA Cup in Coventry City's defeat of Premier League Blackburn Rovers at Ewood Park. For his performance, Mifsud was named as the player of the third round by visitors to the Football Association's website, for which he was made a guest of the FA at the 2008 FA Cup Final. On 26 January, Mifsud scored Coventry's second goal in their FA Cup fourth round win against Millwall.

On 23 April 2008, Mifsud was named as the runner-up for the Coventry City player of the year award by the clubs' fans. The winner was Jay Tabb, who scored 84% of the votes. However, Mifsud got most of the remaining 16%.

On 23 July 2008, Coventry City accepted an undisclosed bid for Mifsud from Bristol City. On 29 July 2008, Bristol City announced that, following negotiations, in which manager Gary Johnson questioned Mifsud's commitment, they would not be proceeding with his signing. After a string of good performances, Mifsud eventually worked his way back into the Coventry City side. Mifsud failed to hit the back of the net regularly during his last season, as he was mostly played as a winger. On 30 June 2009, Mifsud's Coventry City contract expired and he was subsequently released after becoming surplus to requirements by manager Chris Coleman.

=== Barnsley ===
Mifsud joined Barnsley on loan until the end of the season on 2 February 2009 on the same day as Andranik Teymourian and Adam Hammill joining fellow Malta teammate Daniel Bogdanovic at Oakwell. On 10 March 2009, Mifsud scored his first goal for his new club in a 1–1 draw at Oakwell against Birmingham City. Mifsud scored his second goal for Barnsley on 18 March 2009, scoring the third goal in a 3–1 win against Crystal Palace.

=== Return to Malta (2009–13) ===
==== Valletta (first spell) ====
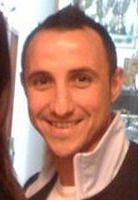
Mifsud in 2010

Mifsud remained a free agent for the last half of 2009 and the start of 2010, even though he was still an automatic choice for the national team. He finally joined Maltese club Valletta until the end of the 2009–10 season.

He made his debut for Valletta on 19 March 2010, against Qormi leaving his mark in the Citizens' 3–0 win. Mifsud scored the third goal with a placed first timer. He failed to score in what would prove to be the decisive game against Birkirkara in the following round, but then scored consecutive hat-tricks against Tarxien Rainbows in the league and against fierce rivals Floriana in the 100 Anniversary Cup Final. He scored a goal in each of the following three Premier Division games, before again failing to score against Birkirkara. He finished the season with seven goals in seven Premier Division games, two goals in three MFA Trophy games, four goals in two MFA Anniversary Cup games – a total of 13 goals in 12 games.

After his brief stint with Valletta at the end of the 2009–10 season, Mifsud once again became a free agent. There was speculation that he wanted to resume his career in England or another country. Mifsud reportedly received interest from Chicago Fire of Major League Soccer in America, Benfica, from various clubs in the Italian Serie B and was even offered a contract by AEK Larnaca, besides being linked with a possible return to Valletta.

==== Qormi ====
Mifsud was to sign with Floriana on 30 January 2010. This move did not materialise and led to the resignation of Floriana's president, Johann Said. However, the player finally reached an agreement with Qormi with whom he played until the end of the Maltese football season. Mifsud debuted for Qormi with a hat trick and a man of the match performance against Birkirkara. The match finished 4–1 for Qormi. The following round saw him failing to score in Qormi's 2–2 draw against Marsaxlokk, a result that meant Qormi would have to play in the relegation pool.

==== Valletta (second spell) ====
On 5 July 2011, after much speculation about his future, Mifsud signed for Valletta, penning a four-year contract. He won the 2011–2012 season of the Maltese Premier League with Valletta, scoring 12 goals in 24 appearances. Included in this was a strike in Valletta's 3–0 defeat of former club Sliema Wanderers on 29 April, to secure his side's 21st national championship. On 3 July 2012, he scored four goals in an 8–0 defeat of Lusitanos in the first qualifying round of the Champions League.

Mifsud left the club in June 2013 to seek a move abroad.

=== Melbourne Heart ===
On 18 September 2013, it was reported that Mifsud had signed for A-League club Melbourne Heart on a one-year deal. Mifsud scored his first goal for the club in round 10 against Sydney FC in a 2–1 loss. Melbourne Heart released Mifsud on 21 March 2014, allowing him to return home to Malta with his family.

=== Career in Malta (2014–21) ===
On 15 June 2014, Mifsud signed for Sliema Wanderers for the third time. On 22 November 2014, Mifsud re-opened his scoring account with Sliema Wanderers with a 63rd-minute goal against Tarxien at Victor Tedesco Stadium.

On 20 January 2016, it was announced that Mifsud would be returning to Valletta on a free transfer after signing a two-and-a-half-year contract with the club. After two years spent with the Liliwhites, in which he had the chance to win one Maltese Premier League title and one Maltese FA Trophy, Mifsud agreed to sign a one-year contract with Birkirkara, that was renewed in 2019

In August 2020, Mifsud signed a one-year deal with Maltese Premier League side Sirens. His spell with the San Pawl il-Baħar's side only lasted few months: in January 2021 Mifsud parted way with Sirens for personal reasons. After a few days, he signed a contract with Mosta F.C. until June.

== International career ==
Mifsud made his first appearance under Josip Ilić's Malta national team on 10 February 2000 against Albania in the National Stadium, Ta' Qali.

He is considered as one of the most prominent players Malta has ever produced. He was instrumental in Malta's victory against Hungary in the Euro 2008 qualifiers, the country's first competitive home victory since 1982.

On 27 March 2008, Mifsud scored five goals for Malta in a 7–1 friendly win over Liechtenstein, completing a hat-trick within just 21 minutes of the kickoff. On 3 March 2010, he surpassed Carmel Busuttil's goalscoring record with the national team, as Mifsud hit the back of the net for Malta in an exhibition match against Finland, which finished in a 1–2 loss for the locals. Mifsud also scored the winning goal (1–0) in Malta's first away win in a World Cup qualifier in many years, against Armenia, on 7 June 2013.

On 11 October 2013, Mifsud gained his 100th cap for Malta, in a match against the Czech Republic. The Czech Republic won 4–1, with Mifsud scoring Malta's only goal.

On 11 November 2020, Mifsud played his last match and scored his last goal in Malta's victory in a friendly against Liechtenstein.

== Career statistics ==
=== Club ===
As of 5 August 2021

Appearances and goals by club, season and competition
Club	Season	League			National cup		League cup		Continental		Other		Total	
Club	Season	Division	Apps	Goals	Apps	Goals	Apps	Goals	Apps	Goals	Apps	Goals	Apps	Goals
1. FC Kaiserslautern	2001–02	Bundesliga	5	0	0	0	–		–		–		5	0
1. FC Kaiserslautern	2002–03	Bundesliga	16	2	2	0	–		1 (Note: Appearance in UEFA Intertoto Cup)	0	–		19	2
1. FC Kaiserslautern	2003–04	Bundesliga	0	0	0	0	–		–		0	0	0	0
1. FC Kaiserslautern	Total		21	2	2	0	–		1	0	–		24	2
1. FC Kaiserslautern II	2001–02	3. Liga	23	13	–		–		–		–		23	13
1. FC Kaiserslautern II	2002–03	3. Liga	13	8	–		–		–		–		13	8
1. FC Kaiserslautern II	2003–04	3. Liga	11	6	–		–		–		–		13	8
1. FC Kaiserslautern II	Total		47	27	–		–		–		–		47	27
Sliema Wanderers	2004–05	Maltese Premier League	12	8	0	0	–		1	0	0	0	13	8
Lillestrøm	2004	Tippeligaen	9	0	1	0	–		–		–		10	0
Lillestrøm	2005	Tippeligaen	15	6	0	0	–		–		–		15	6
Lillestrøm	2006	Tippeligaen	24	11	0	0	–		3	0	–		27	11
Lillestrøm	Total		48	17	1	0	–		3	0	–		52	17
Coventry	2006–07	Championship	19	4	0	0	0	0	–		–		19	4
Coventry	2007–08	Championship	41	10	3	3	3	4	–		–		47	17
Coventry	2008–09	Championship	26	2	1	0	2	0	–		–		29	2
Coventry	Total		86	16	4	3	5	4	–		–		95	23
Barnsley (loan)	2008–09	Championship	15	2	0	0	0	0	–		–		15	2
Valletta	2009–10	Maltese Premier League	7	7	3	2	–		0	0	–		10	9
Qormi	2010–11	Maltese Premier League	6	7	1	0	–		–		–		7	7
Valletta	2011–12	Maltese Premier League	21	10	3	2	–		2 (Note: Appearances in UEFA Champions League)	1	1 (Note: Appearance in Maltese Super Cup)	3	27	16
Valletta	2012–13	Maltese Premier League	28	18	3	0	–		4	6	1	1	36	25
Valletta	Total		49	28	6	2	–		6	7	2	4	63	41
Melbourne Heart	2013–14	A-League	14	1	–		–		–		–		14	1
Sliema Wanderers	2014–15	Maltese Premier League	20	2	1	0	–		2 (Note: Appearance(s) in UEFA Europa League)	0	–		23	2
Sliema Wanderers	2015–16	Maltese Premier League	15	8	1	0	–		–		–		16	8
Sliema Wanderers	Total		35	10	2	0	–		2	0	–		39	10
Valletta	2015–16	Maltese Premier League	14	4	1	0	–		0	0	–		15	4
Valletta	2016–17	Maltese Premier League	24	4	0	0	–		3	0	1	0	28	4
Valletta	2017–18	Maltese Premier League	19	3	3	1	–		4	0	–		26	4
Valletta	Total		57	11	4	1	–		7	0	1	0	68	12
Birkirkara	2018–19	Maltese Premier League	20	7	4	3	–		2	1	–		26	11
Birkirkara	2019–20	Maltese Premier League	16	0	1	0	–		–		–		17	0
Birkirkara	Total		36	7	5	3	–		2	1	–		43	11
Sirens	2020–21	Maltese Premier League	9	1	0	0	–		1	0	–		10	1
Mosta	2020–21	Maltese Premier League	8	2	2	0	–		–		–		10	2
Mosta	2021–22	Maltese Premier League	0	0	0	0	–		2 (Note: Appearances in UEFA Europa Conference League)	0	–		2	0
Mosta	Total		8	2	2	0	–		2	0	–		12	2
Career total			452	146	30	11	5	4	25	8	3	4	515	173

=== International ===
Scores and results list Malta's goal tally first, score column indicates score after each Mifsud goal.

List of international goals scored by Michael Mifsud
No.	Date	Venue	Opponent	Score	Result	Competition
1	25 April 2001	Ta' Qali National Stadium, Ta' Qali, Malta	Iceland	1–0	1–4	2002 FIFA World Cup qualifying
2	14 November 2001	Ta' Qali National Stadium, Ta' Qali, Malta	Canada	2–1	2–1	Friendly
3	9 February 2002	Ta' Qali National Stadium, Ta' Qali, Malta	Jordan	1–0	2–1	2002 Malta Tournament
4	13 February 2002	Ta' Qali National Stadium, Ta' Qali, Malta	Moldova	3–0	3–0	2002 Malta Tournament
5	17 April 2002	Ta' Qali National Stadium, Ta' Qali, Malta	Azerbaijan	1–0	1–0	Friendly
6	20 November 2002	GSP Stadium, Nicosia, Cyprus	Cyprus	1–2	1–2	UEFA Euro 2004 qualifying
7	30 April 2003	Ta' Qali National Stadium, Ta' Qali, Malta	Slovenia	1–3	1–3	UEFA Euro 2004 qualifying
8	10 September 2003	Atatürk Olympic Stadium, Istanbul, Turkey	Israel	1–1	2–2	UEFA Euro 2004 qualifying
9	31 March 2004	Ta' Qali National Stadium, Ta' Qali, Malta	Finland	1–2	1–2	Friendly
10	18 August 2004	Tórsvøllur, Tórshavn, Faroe Islands	Faroe Islands	2–2	2–3	Friendly
11	13 October 2004	Vasil Levski Stadium, Sofia, Bulgaria	Bulgaria	1–0	1–4	2006 FIFA World Cup qualifying
12	2 September 2006	Ta' Qali National Stadium, Ta' Qali, Malta	Bosnia and Herzegovina	2–5	2–5	UEFA Euro 2008 qualifying
13	17 October 2007	Ta' Qali National Stadium, Ta' Qali, Malta	Moldova	2–3	2–3	UEFA Euro 2008 qualifying
14	21 November 2007	Ta' Qali National Stadium, Ta' Qali, Malta	Norway	1–3	1–4	UEFA Euro 2008 qualifying
15	26 March 2008	Ta' Qali National Stadium, Ta' Qali, Malta	Liechtenstein	1–0	7–1	Friendly
16	26 March 2008	Ta' Qali National Stadium, Ta' Qali, Malta	Liechtenstein	2–0	7–1	Friendly
17	26 March 2008	Ta' Qali National Stadium, Ta' Qali, Malta	Liechtenstein	3–0	7–1	Friendly
18	26 March 2008	Ta' Qali National Stadium, Ta' Qali, Malta	Liechtenstein	5–1	7–1	Friendly
19	26 March 2008	Ta' Qali National Stadium, Ta' Qali, Malta	Liechtenstein	6–1	7–1	Friendly
20	30 May 2008	Ernst-Happel-Stadion, Vienna, Austria	Austria	1–2	1–5	Friendly
21	12 August 2009	Ta' Qali National Stadium, Ta' Qali, Malta	Georgia	1–0	2–0	Friendly
22	12 August 2009	Ta' Qali National Stadium, Ta' Qali, Malta	Georgia	2–0	2–0	Friendly
23	18 November 2009	Ta' Qali National Stadium, Ta' Qali, Malta	Bulgaria	1–1	1–4	Friendly
24	3 March 2010	Ta' Qali National Stadium, Ta' Qali, Malta	Finland	1–0	1–2	Friendly
25	11 August 2010	Ta' Qali National Stadium, Ta' Qali, Malta	North Macedonia	1–1	1–1	Friendly
26	4 June 2011	Karaiskakis Stadium, Piraeus, Greece	Greece	1–2	1–3	UEFA Euro 2012 qualifying
27	10 August 2011	Ta' Qali National Stadium, Ta' Qali, Malta	Central African Republic	1–0	2–1	Friendly
28	10 August 2011	Ta' Qali National Stadium, Ta' Qali, Malta	Central African Republic	2–1	2–1	Friendly
29	2 September 2011	Ta' Qali National Stadium, Ta' Qali, Malta	Croatia	1–2	1–3	UEFA Euro 2012 qualifying
30	6 September 2011	Ta' Qali National Stadium, Ta' Qali, Malta	Georgia	1–1	1–1	UEFA Euro 2012 qualifying
31	29 February 2012	Ta' Qali National Stadium, Ta' Qali, Malta	Liechtenstein	1–1	2–1	Friendly
32	29 February 2012	Ta' Qali National Stadium, Ta' Qali, Malta	Liechtenstein	2–1	2–1	Friendly
33	2 June 2012	Stade Josy Barthel, Route d'Arlon, Luxembourg	Luxembourg	1–0	2–0	Friendly
34	2 June 2012	Stade Josy Barthel, Route d'Arlon, Luxembourg	Luxembourg	2–0	2–0	Friendly
35	14 August 2012	Stadio Olimpico, Sarravalle, San Marino	San Marino	1–1	3–2	Friendly
36	14 August 2012	Stadio Olimpico, Sarravalle, San Marino	San Marino	3–1	3–2	Friendly
37	7 June 2013	Republican Stadium, Yerevan, Armenia	Armenia	1–0	1–0	2014 FIFA World Cup qualification
38	11 October 2013	Ta' Qali National Stadium, Ta' Qali, Malta	Czech Republic	1–2	1–4	2014 FIFA World Cup qualification
39	19 November 2013	Ta' Qali National Stadium, Ta' Qali, Malta	Faroe Islands	2–0	3–2	Friendly
40	6 September 2015	Ta' Qali National Stadium, Ta' Qali, Malta	Azerbaijan	1–1	2–2	UEFA Euro 2016 qualifying
41	7 September 2018	Tórsvøllur, Tórshavn, Faroe Islands	Faroe Islands	1–2	1–3	2018–19 UEFA Nations League D
42	11 November 2020	Ta' Qali National Stadium, Ta' Qali, Malta	Liechtenstein	1–0	3–0	Friendly

== Honours ==
Valletta

- Maltese Premier League: 2011–12, 2015–16, 2017–18
- Maltese FA Trophy: 2009–10
- Maltese Super Cup: 2011, 2012

== See also ==
- List of top international men's football goalscorers by country
- List of men's footballers with 100 or more international caps
