= Juan Cruz Gill =

Argentine professional footballer

Personal information
- Full name: Juan Cruz Gill
- Date of birth: 18 July 1983 (age 43)
- Place of birth: Villa María, Argentina
- Height: 1.79 m (5 ft 10 1/2 in)
- Position: Defender

Team information
- Current team: Alianza Lima (assistant)

Youth career
- Talleres

Senior career*
Years	Team	Apps	(Gls)
2004–2008	Talleres	79	(2)
2008	Deportes Melipilla	18	(1)
2009–2011	Ermis Aradippou	56	(0)
2011	Estudiantes de Mérida	13	(0)
2012–2013	Unión Temuco	37	(1)
2013–2014	Deportes Temuco	25	(2)
2015	Iberia	7	(0)
2015–2019	Valletta	57	(2)
2019	→ Tarxien Rainbows (loan)	10	(2)
2019–2020	Sliema Wanderers	12	(1)
2020–2021	Lija Athletic	20	(0)
2021–2022	Marsaxlokk	–	(–)
Total		334	(11)

Managerial career
- 2023–2024: Valletta (assistant)
- 2024: Valletta (caretaker)
- 2024–: Alianza Lima (assistant)
- * Club domestic league appearances and goals

Juan Cruz Gill (born 18 July 1983) is an Argentine former professional footballer who played as a defender.

== Playing career ==
He began as a professional footballer for Talleres de Córdoba of the Argentine Primera División during the 2004 season. His first match was on 20 June 2004, a 3–2 win over River Plate. After four seasons in the team Córdoba, Cruz Gill moved to Chilean Primera División club Deportes Melipilla, where he had a successful spell personally .However, although his club was relegated to the second tier. In January 2009, he joined Cypriot club Ermis Aradippou, champions of the Cypriot Second Division in the 2008-09 season.

In 2011, he moved to Venezuelan club Estudiantes de Mérida. The following year, Gill returned to Chile and joined to the Primera B side Unión Temuco.

In the second half of 2015, Gill moved to Malta and signed with Valletta FC.

On 28 July 2020, Gill signed with Lija Athletic. Gill signed for Maltese Challenge League side Marsaxlokk on 23 June 2021.

== Personal life ==
Gill also obtained Italian citizenship, due to his ancestry.

== Coaching career ==
Following his retirement, Gill started his coaching career in Malta. In August 2024, he returned to South America and joined the technical staff of Mariano Soso in Alianza Lima as an assistant coach.

== Honours ==
=== Player ===
Ermis Aradippou

- Cypriot Second Division (1): 2008-09

Valletta

- Maltese Premier League (3): 2015–16, 2017–18, 2018–19
- Maltese FA Trophy (1): 2017–18
