= Claudio Pani =

Italian footballer (born 1986)

Personal information
- Full name: Claudio Pani
- Date of birth: 11 March 1986 (age 40)
- Place of birth: Cagliari, Italy
- Position: Midfielder

Team information
- Current team: Sliema Wanderers F.C.
- Number: 23

Youth career
- 1999–2006: Cagliari

Senior career*
| Years | Team | Apps | (Gls) |
| 2004–2006 | Cagliari | 2 | (0) |
| 2006–2007 | → Pistoiese (loan) | 26 | (0) |
| 2007–2008 | → Modena (loan) | 25 | (0) |
| 2008–2009 | Cagliari | 1 | (0) |
| 2009–2011 | Triestina | 38 | (0) |
| 2011 | → Lucchese (loan) | 8 | (0) |
| 2011 | Triestina | 0 | (0) |
| 2011–2012 | Piacenza | 24 | (2) |
| 2012–2013 | Casale | 18 | (0) |
| 2013 | Piacenza | 10 | (0) |
| 2014 | Savona | 0 | (0) |
| 2015–2018 | Valletta | 34 | (1) |
| 2018– | Sliema Wanderers | | |

International career
| 2004 | Italy U19 | 1 | (0) |
- * Club domestic league appearances and goals as of January 2014

Claudio Pani (born 11 March 1986) is an Italian former football midfielder.
