= 2015–16 Pafos FC season =

Pafos
2015–16 season
- Manager: Sofoklis Sofokleous (until 9 November); José Manuel Roca (17 November - 14 December); Apostolos Makrides (from 16 December)
- Stadium: Pafiako Stadium
- Cyta Championship: 12th
- Cypriot Cup: Quarterfinal vs Omonia
- Top goalscorer: League: Nassir Maachi (11); All: Nassir Maachi (13)
Home colours	Away colours

The 2015–16 season was Pafos's first season in the Cypriot First Division and second season in existence. They finished the League season in 14th position, and where relegated back to the Cypriot Second Division. Whilst in the Cypriot Cup they reached the Quarterfinals where they were defeated by Omonia, 8–0 on aggregate.

== Season review ==
On 25 May 2015, Pafos announced that Nassir Maachi had signed from Birkirkara for the upcoming season, whilst Carlos Marques joined from Doxa Katokopias on 29 May 2015.

On 10 June, Pafos announced the signing of Hugues Ayivi from Vendée Poiré-sur-Vie. The following day, 11 June, Pafos announced that signing of Nikoloz Gelashvili and Jānis Krūmiņš.

On 3 July, Pafos announced then signing of Rasheed Alabi for the upcoming season.

On 7 July, Pafos announced then signing of Emmanuel Okoye.

On 9 July, Pafos announced the signing of Elgujja Grigalashvili for the upcoming season, whilst fellow Georgian Gia Grigalava signed a one-year contract two days later on 11 July.

On 30 December, Pafos announced then signing of Miguel Alba from Guaraní on a contract until the end of the season.

On 7 January, Jordi Codina joined Pafos on loan for the remainder of the season from APOEL. Whilst Éric Matoukou also joined in January from Inter Turku, signing a contract with Pafos until the end of the season.

== Squad ==
As of match played 15 May 2016

No.	Name	Nationality	Position	Date of birth (age)	Signed from	Signed in	Contract ends	Apps.	Goals
Goalkeepers
1	Jānis Krūmiņš	(Latvia)	GK	9 January 1992 (aged 24)	Akritas Chlorakas	2015	2016	7	0
46	Jordi Codina	(Spain)	GK	27 April 1982 (aged 34)	on loan from APOEL	2016	2016	18	0
86	Charalambos Kyriakides	(Cyprus)	GK	30 November 1998 (aged 17)	Akritas Chlorakas	2015		0	0
90	Andreas Vassiliou	(Cyprus)	GK	6 June 1996 (aged 19)	Academy	2015		1	0
Defenders
2	Rasheed Alabi	(Nigeria)	DF	9 January 1986 (aged 30)	Leixões	2015		28	0
13	Carlos Marques	(Portugal)	DF	6 February 1993 (aged 23)	Doxa Katokopias	2015		17	0
14	Éric Matoukou	(Cameroon)	DF	8 July 1983 (aged 32)	Inter Turku	2016	2016	13	1
21	Thomas Ioannou	(Cyprus)	DF	19 July 1995 (aged 20)	AEP Paphos	2014			
33	Rolandos Michael	(Cyprus)	DF	17 January 1997 (aged 19)	Academy	2015		1	0
44	Jurica Grgec	(Croatia)	DF	1 September 1992 (aged 23)	NK Zelina	2014			
97	Stefanos Miller	(Cyprus)	DF	14 January 1997 (aged 19)	Academy	2014			
Midfielders
3	Joël Damahou	(Ivory Coast)	MF	28 January 1987 (aged 29)	Tours	2015		35	5
7	Ivan Forbes	(Portugal)	MF	1 December 1986 (aged 29)	AEK Kouklia	2014			
8	Giorgos Sielis	(Cyprus)	MF	23 October 1986 (aged 29)	AEK Kouklia	2014			
10	Hugo Moutinho	(Portugal)	MF	1 January 1981 (aged 35)	AEK Kouklia	2014			
14	Anastasis Makris	(Cyprus)	MF	29 July 1992 (aged 23)	AEK Kouklia	2014			
17	Panagiotis Zachariou	(Cyprus)	MF	26 February 1996 (aged 20)	AEP Paphos	2014			
23	Hervé Bodiong	(Cameroon)	MF	17 June 1997 (aged 18)	on loan from Tours	2015	2916	11	2
77	Fotis Sofokleous	(Cyprus)	MF	7 April 1998 (aged 18)	Finikas Ayias	2015		1	0
88	Levan Khmaladze	(Georgia (country))	MF	6 April 1985 (aged 31)	Othellos Athienou	2015		34	2
Forwards
11	Miguel Alba	(Argentina)	FW	14 August 1988 (aged 27)	Guaraní	2015	2016	16	4
16	Nassir Maachi	(Netherlands)	FW	9 September 1985 (aged 30)	Birkirkara	2015		32	13
31	Emmanuel Okoye	(Nigeria)	FW	4 April 1991 (aged 25)	Unattached	2015		36	5
32	Charalambos Charalambous	(Cyprus)	FW	4 April 2002 (aged 14)	Academy	2015		1	0
56	Charalambos Demosthenous	(Cyprus)	FW	6 April 1985 (aged 31)	Aris Limassol	2015			
95	Ibson Melo	(Brazil)	FW	8 October 1989 (aged 26)	Ayia Napa	2016		21	1
99	Hugues Ayivi	(France)	FW	6 April 1985 (aged 31)	Vendée Poiré-sur-Vie	2015		35	2
Out on loan
Left during the season
5	Gia Grigalava	(Georgia (country))	DF	5 August 1989 (aged 26)	Unattached	2015	2016	16	1
9	Nikoloz Gelashvili	(Georgia (country))	FW	5 August 1985 (aged 30)	Flamurtari	2015		14	4
30	Elgujja Grigalashvili	(Georgia (country))	MF	30 December 1989 (aged 26)	Othellos Athienou	2015		13	2
89	Roin Kvaskhvadze	(Georgia (country))	GK	9 January 1992 (aged 24)	Othellos Athienou	2015		15	0

== Transfers ==
=== In ===
Date	Position	Nationality	Name	From	Fee	Ref.
25 May 2015	FW	(Netherlands)	Nassir Maachi	Birkirkara	Undisclosed	
29 May 2015	DF	(Portugal)	Carlos Marques	Doxa Katokopias	Undisclosed	
10 June 2015	FW	(France)	Hugues Ayivi	Vendée Poiré-sur-Vie	Undisclosed	
11 June 2015	GK	(Latvia)	Jānis Krūmiņš	Akritas Chlorakas	Undisclosed	
11 June 2015	FW	(Georgia (country))	Nikoloz Gelashvili	Flamurtari	Undisclosed	
3 July 2015	DF	(Nigeria)	Rasheed Alabi	Leixões	Undisclosed	
7 July 2015	FW	(Nigeria)	Emmanuel Okoye	Unattached	Free	
9 July 2015	MF	(Georgia (country))	Elgujja Grigalashvili	Othellos Athienou	Undisclosed	
11 July 2015	DF	(Georgia (country))	Gia Grigalava	Unattached	Free	
1 July 2015	GK	(Georgia (country))	Roin Kvaskhvadze	Othellos Athienou	Undisclosed	
1 July 2015	MF	(Cameroon)	Hervé Bodiong	Tours	Undisclosed	
1 July 2015	MF	(Georgia (country))	Levan Khmaladze	Othellos Athienou	Undisclosed	
1 July 2015	MF	(Ivory Coast)	Joël Damahou	Tours	Undisclosed	
30 December 2015	FW	(Argentina)	Miguel Alba	Guaraní	Undisclosed	
4 January 2016	FW	(Brazil)	Ibson Melo	Ayia Napa	Undisclosed	
12 January 2016	DF	(Cameroon)	Éric Matoukou	Inter Turku	Undisclosed	

=== Loans in ===
Start date	Position	Nationality	Name	From	End date	Ref.
7 January 2016	GK	(Spain)	Jordi Codina	APOEL	30 June 2016	

=== Out ===
Date	Position	Nationality	Name	To	Fee	Ref.
7 January 2016	MF	(Georgia (country))	Elgujja Grigalashvili	Ethnikos Achna	Undisclosed	
17 January 2016	GK	(Georgia (country))	Roin Kvaskhvadze	Torpedo Kutaisi	Undisclosed	
19 January 2016	FW	(Georgia (country))	Nikoloz Gelashvili	Dinamo Tbilisi	Undisclosed	

=== Released ===
Date	Position	Nationality	Name	Joined	Date	Ref
1 January 2016	DF	(Georgia (country))	Gia Grigalava	Ethnikos Achna	25 August 2016	

== Competitions ==
=== Overview ===
Competition	First match	Last match	Starting round	Final position	Record							
Competition	First match	Last match	Starting round	Final position	Pld	W	D	L	GF	GA	GD	Win %
Cyta Championship	22 August 2015	15 May 2016	Matchday 1	14th	36	8	12	16	41	58	−17	22.22
Cypriot Cup	6 January 2016	17 February 2016	Second round	Quarterfinal	4	2	0	2	5	8	−3	50.00
Total					40	10	12	18	46	66	−20	25.00

Last updated: 15 May 2016
Source: Competitions

=== Cyta Championship ===
==== Regular season ====
===== League table =====
Pos	Team	Pld	W	D	L	GF	GA	GD	Pts	Qualification or relegation
1	APOEL	26	20	2	4	72	18	+54	62	Qualification for the championship round
2	AEK Larnaca	26	19	4	3	47	17	+30	61	Qualification for the championship round
3	Anorthosis Famagusta	26	15	7	4	48	22	+26	52	Qualification for the championship round
4	Omonia	26	14	7	5	46	24	+22	49 (Note: Head-to-head record: Omonia 0–0 Apollon, Apollon 0–0 Omonia.)	Qualification for the championship round
5	Apollon Limassol	26	14	7	5	41	24	+17	49	Qualification for the championship round
6	Nea Salamis Famagusta	26	8	9	9	37	52	−15	33	Qualification for the championship round
7	Aris Limassol	26	8	7	11	29	31	−2	31 (Note: Head-to-head record: AEL 1–2 Aris, Aris 0–1 AEL.)	Qualification for the relegation round
8	AEL Limassol	26	9	4	13	22	32	−10	31	Qualification for the relegation round
9	Doxa Katokopias	26	7	9	10	31	41	−10	30	Qualification for the relegation round
10	Pafos FC	26	6	9	11	35	47	−12	27	Qualification for the relegation round
11	Ethnikos Achna	26	5	9	12	27	43	−16	24 (Note: Head-to-head record: Ethnikos 2–2 Ermis, Ermis 1–2 Ethnikos.)	Qualification for the relegation round
12	Ermis Aradippou	26	6	6	14	22	40	−18	24	Qualification for the relegation round
13	Enosis Neon Paralimni (R)	26	4	8	14	28	47	−19	20	Relegation to the Cypriot Second Division
14	Ayia Napa (R)	26	0	6	20	17	64	−47	6	Relegation to the Cypriot Second Division

Source: UEFA, CFA, Soccerway
Rules for classification: 1) Points; 2) Head-to-head points; 3) Head-to-head goal difference; 4) Head-to-head goals scored; 5) Head-to-head away goals scored (only if two teams); 6) Goal difference; 7) Goals scored; 8) Play-off (only if deciding championship round, relegation round or relegation).
(R) Relegated

===== Results summary =====
Overall								Home						Away					
Pld	W	D	L	GF	GA	GD	Pts	W	D	L	GF	GA	GD	W	D	L	GF	GA	GD
26	6	9	11	35	47	−12	27	5	5	3	23	15	+8	1	4	8	12	32	−20

Last updated: 2 March 2016.
Source: Results

===== Results =====
22 August 2015 1	Pafos	0−2	AEK Larnaca	Pafos
19:00 EEST (UTC+3)	Forbes (yellow card) 30'; Khmaladze (yellow card) 41' (yellow-red card) 70'; Damahou (yellow card) 55'	Report	Ortiz (yellow card) 11'; Tomàs (yellow card) 21' (goal) 71', 79'; Tete (yellow card) 56'; Boljević (yellow card) 73'	Stadium: Pafiako Stadium; Referee: Demetris Masias

30 August 2015 2	APOEL	6−2	Pafos	Nicosia
20:00 EEST (UTC+3)	De Vincenti (yellow card) 14' (goal) 40'; Vinícius 32', 71'; Charalambidis 61'; Alexandrou (yellow card) 67'; Cavenaghi 86', 90+1'	Report	Damahou 38'; Grigalava (yellow card) 45+1' (goal) 88'	Stadium: GSP Stadium; Referee: Yiannis Anastasiou

12 September 2015 3	Pafos	3−0	Aris Limassol	Pafos
19:00 EEST (UTC+3)	Marques (yellow card) 42'; Gelashvili 45+1'; Maachi 48'; Kvaskhvadze (yellow card) 65'; Damahou 84' (pen.)	Report	Efstathiou (yellow card) 24'; Theophilou (yellow card) 84'	Stadium: Pafiako Stadium; Referee: Neofytos Neofytou

20 September 2015 4	Enosis Neon Paralimni	2−1	Pafos	Paralimni
18:00 EEST (UTC+3)	Azmy (yellow card) 14'; Budimir (yellow card) 29' (goal) 62'; Bojović 74'	Report	Kvaskhvadze (yellow card) 29'; Gelashvili (yellow card) 33'; Maachi 42'	Stadium: Tasos Markou Stadium; Referee: Andreas Orthodoxou

27 September 2015 5	Pafos	0−0	AEL Limassol	Pafos
19:00 EEST (UTC+3)	Moutinho (yellow card) 5'; Alabi (yellow card) 82'	Report	Airosa (yellow card) 26'; Soares (yellow card) 27'; Feltscher (yellow card) 44'; Eleftheriou (yellow card) 86'	Stadium: Pafiako Stadium; Referee: Loukas Soteriou

3 October 2015 6	Nea Salamis Famagusta	1−1	Pafos	Larnaca
16:00 EEST (UTC+3)	Čurjurić 90+2' (yellow card) 90+2'	Report	Maachi 56' (yellow card) 84'	Stadium: Ammochostos Stadium; Referee: Andreas Orthodoxou

18 October 2015 7	Pafos	3−0	Ethnikos Achna	Pafos
18:00 EEST (UTC+3)	Gelashvili 20'; Moutinho (yellow card) 25'; Maachi 58'; Forbes (yellow card) 62'; Okoye (yellow card) 68'; Damahou (yellow card) 72'; Grigalashvili 89'	Report	Ogungbe (yellow card) 39'; Iacob (yellow card) 51'; Eduardo (yellow card) 70'	Stadium: Pafiako Stadium; Referee: Avraam Tsoukkas

24 October 2015 8	AC Omonia	6−0	Pafos	Nicosia
18:00 EEST (UTC+3)	Assis 13' (pen.); Economides 32'; Kirm 54'; Schembri 76', 90+1'; Okeuhie 84'	Report	Kvaskhvadze (red card) 9'; Gelashvili (yellow card) 19'; Ayivi (yellow card) 80'	Stadium: GSP Stadium; Referee: Charalambos Skapoullis

1 November 2015 9	Pafos	1−2	Anorthosis Famagusta	Pafos
16:00 EET (UTC+2)	Maachi 60'	Report	Avraam 42'; João Victor (yellow card) 58'; Nuhu (yellow card) 73' (yellow-red card) 90+2'; Tzanakakis (yellow card) 87'; Koulouris 89'	Stadium: Pafiako Stadium; Referee: Nikolas Neokleous

7 November 2015 10	Ayia Napa	1−1	Pafos	Ayia Napa
17:00 EET (UTC+2)	Mguni 7'; Felgate (yellow card) 11'; Maatsen (yellow card) 63'; Fusco (yellow card) 90+3'	Report	Forbes (yellow card) 31'; Grigalashvili 75'	Stadium: Paralimni Stadium; Referee: Vasilis Demetriou

22 November 2015 11	Pafos	0−0	Apollon Limassol	Pafos
16:00 EET (UTC+2)	Moutinho (yellow card) 51'; Okoye (yellow card) 68'; Grigalava (yellow card) 80'	Report	Alex (yellow card) 35'; Gullón (yellow card) 64'	Stadium: Pafiako Stadium; Referee: Avraam Tsoukkas

28 November 2015 12	Ermis Aradippou	2−1	Pafos	Aradippou
19:00 EET (UTC+2)	Keita 13'; Christofi (yellow card) 47'; Misidjan (yellow card) 51'; Ndong (yellow card) 77'; Mayele 86'; Stylianou (yellow card) 88'	Report	Gelashvili (yellow card) 33' (goal) 50'; Makris (yellow card) 46'; Maachi (yellow card) 61' Alabi (red card) 80'	Stadium: Ammochostos Stadium; Referee: Christos Elia

6 December 2015 13	Pafos	3−3	Doxa Katokopias	Pafos
16:00 EET (UTC+2)	Okoye (yellow card) 4'; Maachi 46' (yellow card) 55'; Grgec (yellow card) 54'; Khmaladze (yellow card) 60' (goal) 74'; Gelashvili (yellow card) 74' (goal) 90' (pen.)	Report	Lobo 55' (pen.); Carlitos 70' (yellow card) 70'; Fofana (yellow card) 74' (goal) 84'; Negri (yellow card) 74'; Garai (yellow card) 89'	Stadium: Pafiako Stadium; Referee: Kostas Nikolaou

12 December 2015 14	AEK Larnaca	3−0	Pafos	Larnaca
18:00 EET (UTC+2)	Alves 29', 46'; Englezou 39'	Report	Grgec (yellow card) 15'; Gelashvili (yellow card) 33'	Stadium: GSZ Stadium; Referee: Andreas Orthodoxou

19 December 2015 15	Pafos	0−1	APOEL	Pafos
17:00 EET (UTC+2)	Okoye (yellow card) 38'; Khmaladze (yellow card) 66'; Marques (yellow card) 79'	Report	Vander 14'; Artymatas (yellow card) 21'; Efrem (yellow card) 28'	Stadium: Pafiako Stadium; Referee: Charalambos Skapoullis

22 December 2015 16	Aris Limassol	1−0	Pafos	Limassol
18:00 EET (UTC+2)	Randy (yellow card) 4'; Douglas 11'; Boniface (yellow card) 56'; Panagi (yellow card) 68'	Report	Forbes (yellow card) 18'	Stadium: Tsirio Stadium; Referee: Yiannis Anastasiou

2 January 2016 17	Pafos	3−3	Enosis Neon Paralimni	Pafos
17:00 EET (UTC+2)	Khmaladze 9'; Ioannou (yellow card) 35'; Sielis (yellow card) 61'; Damahou 62'; Bodiong (yellow card) 82'; Bojović 90+1' (o.g.)	Report	Svojić 5'; Papadopoulos 20'; Froxylias 63'; Budimir (yellow card) 75'; Tsiaklis (yellow card) 80'	Stadium: Pafiako Stadium; Referee: Nikolas Neokleous

9 January 2016 18	AEL Limassol	0−0	Pafos	Limassol
17:00 EET (UTC+2)	Paulo (yellow card) 20'; Ohene (yellow card) 44'	Report	Khmaladze (yellow card) 37'; Alabi (yellow card) 49' (yellow-red card) 61'; Marques (yellow card) 81'	Stadium: Tsirio Stadium; Referee: Kostas Psevdiotis

18 January 2016 19	Pafos	2−2	Nea Salamis Famagusta	Pafos
19:00 EET (UTC+2)	Ayivi 47'; Matoukou (yellow card) 63'; Ioannou (yellow card) 66'; Forbes (yellow card) 90+3'; Sielis (yellow card) 90+3'; Damahou 90+7'	Report	Čurjurić (yellow card) 33'; Makriev 67' (pen.), 90+2' (pen.)	Stadium: Pafiako Stadium; Referee: Charalambos Skapoullis

23 January 2016 20	Ethnikos Achna	1−1	Pafos	Achna
17:00 EET (UTC+2)	Arrabal (yellow card) 21'; Eduardo 26' (pen.) (yellow card) 74'; Prager (yellow card) 33'	Report	Matoukou (yellow card) 15'; Maachi 39'; Grgec (yellow card) 61'; Damahou (yellow card) 73'	Stadium: Dasaki Stadium; Referee: Loukas Soteriou

31 January 2016 21	Pafos	2−1	AC Omonia	Pafos
16:00 EET (UTC+2)	Melo (l), 28'; Grgec (yellow card) 50'; Maachi 89'	Report	Sheridan 25'; Assis (yellow card) 63'	Stadium: Pafiako Stadium; Referee: Christos Nikolaides

8 February 2016 22	Anorthosis Famagusta	5−1	Pafos	Larnaca
19:00 EET (UTC+2)	Ndlovu 14', 71' (pen.); Orlandi 58'; Maisuradze (yellow card) 78'; Koulouris 89', 90+3'	Report	Forbes (yellow card) 53'; Matoukou 54'; Maachi (yellow card) 70'; Okoye (yellow card) 74'	Stadium: Antonis Papadopoulos Stadium; Referee: Demetris Masias

14 February 2016 21	Pafos	4−1	Ayia Napa	Pafos
16:00 EET (UTC+2)	Okoye 17', 38'; Ayivi 29'; Damahou 75' (pen.)	Report	Moulazimis 2'; Slowe (yellow card) 74'	Stadium: Pafiako Stadium; Referee: Nikolas Athanasiou

20 February 2016 22	Apollon Limassol	3−1	Pafos	Limassol
18:00 EET (UTC+2)	Vasiliou (yellow card) 8'; João Pedro (yellow card) 36'; Maglica 55', 59', 71'	Report	Alba (yellow card) 35'; Matoukou (yellow card) 58'; Alabi (yellow card) 88'; Maachi 89'	Stadium: Tsirio Stadium; Referee: Neofytos Neofytou

27 February 2016 23	Pafos	2−0	Ermis Aradippou	Pafos
16:00 EET (UTC+2)	Matoukou (yellow card) 17'; Alba (yellow card) 69' (goal) 80'; Okoye 90+4' (yellow card) 90+5'	Report	Yiangoudakis (yellow card) 66'	Stadium: Pafiako Stadium; Referee: Kostas Psevdiotis

2 March 2016 24	Doxa Katokopias	1−3	Pafos	Peristerona
16:00 EET (UTC+2)	León 88'	Report	Alba 18' (yellow card) 70'; Marques (yellow card) 26'; Maachi 47' (yellow card) 90+4'; Ioannou (yellow card) 52'; Khmaladze (yellow card) 84'; Bodiong 85'	Stadium: Makario Stadium; Referee: Demetris Masias

==== Relegation round ====
===== League table =====
Pos	Team	Pld	W	D	L	GF	GA	GD	Pts	Relegation
7	AEL Limassol (Note: On 8 April 2016, AEL Limassol were deducted two points by Cyprus Football Association after failing to meet the financial criteria of UEFA.)	36	14	7	15	38	43	−5	47	
8	Ermis Aradippou	36	11	9	16	36	52	−16	42	
9	Doxa Katokopias	36	10	11	15	46	59	−13	41 (Note: Doxa ahead of Aris on head-to-head away goals scored: Doxa–Aris 2–1, Aris–Doxa 1–1, Doxa–Aris 1–1, Aris–Doxa 4–3.)	
10	Aris Limassol	36	10	11	15	43	46	−3	41	
11	Ethnikos Achna	36	9	12	15	43	57	−14	39	
12	Pafos FC (R)	36	8	12	16	41	58	−17	36	Relegation to the Cypriot Second Division

Source: UEFA, CFA, Soccerway
Rules for classification: 1) Points; 2) Head-to-head points; 3) Head-to-head goal difference; 4) Head-to-head goals scored; 5) Head-to-head away goals scored (only if two teams); 6) Goal difference; 7) Goals scored; 8) Play-off (only if deciding relegation).
(R) Relegated

===== Results summary =====
Overall								Home						Away					
Pld	W	D	L	GF	GA	GD	Pts	W	D	L	GF	GA	GD	W	D	L	GF	GA	GD
10	2	3	5	6	11	−5	9	2	2	1	5	3	+2	0	1	4	1	8	−7

Last updated: 15 May 2016.
Source: Results

===== Results =====
6 March 2016 23	Pafos	2−0	Doxa Katokopias	Pafos
16:00 EET (UTC+2)	Alba 34'; Maachi 81'	Report	Silva (yellow card) 40'; Chatzifrangiskos (yellow card) 71'	Stadium: Pafiako Stadium; Referee: Andreas Orthodoxou

11 March 2016 24	Aris Limassol	0−0	Pafos	Limassol
18:00 EET (UTC+2)	Kyriacou (yellow card) 86'; Theofilou (yellow card) 90+2'	Report	Codina (yellow card) 44'; Ioannou (yellow card) 88'	Stadium: Tsirio Stadium; Referee: Avraam Tsoukkas

20 March 2016 25	Ermis Aradippou	1−0	Pafos	Larnaca
16:00 EET (UTC+2)	Sîrghi (yellow card) 16'; Dickson 32'	Report	Alba (yellow card) 15'	Stadium: Ammochostos Stadium; Referee: Charalambos Skapoullis

3 April 2016 26	Pafos	1−1	AEL Limassol	Pafos
16:00 EEST (UTC+3)	Matoukou (yellow card) 6'; Alba (yellow card) 43'; Okoye (yellow card) 52'; Grgec 62' (yellow card) 82'; Ioannou (yellow card) 80'	Report	Piech 11'; Stjepanović (yellow card) 12'; Airosa (yellow card) 44'; Ohene (yellow card) 90+1'	Stadium: Pafiako Stadium; Referee: Kostas Psevdiotis

10 April 2016 27	Ethnikos Achna	3−0	Pafos	Achna
16:00 EEST (UTC+3)	Chadjivasilis 26', 30'; Eduardo (yellow card) 68'; Iacob 77'	Report	Grgec (yellow card) 50'; Alabi (yellow card) 80'	Stadium: Dasaki Stadium; Referee: Demetris Masias

17 April 2016 28	Doxa Katokopias	3−1	Pafos	Nicosia
16:00 EEST (UTC+3)	Aguinaldo 21'; Carlitos 25'; López (yellow card) 29'; Fofana 82'; Aresti (yellow card) 90'	Report	Damahou (yellow card) 67'; Okoye 86'	Stadium: Makario Stadium; Referee: Giorgos Nikolaou

24 April 2016 29	Pafos	1−0	Aris Limassol	Pafos
17:00 EEST (UTC+3)	Forbes (yellow card) 31'; Okoye 62'; Khmaladze (yellow card) 83'	Report	Kyprou (yellow card) 90'	Stadium: Pafiako Stadium; Referee: Vasilis Demetriou

27 April 2016 30	Pafos	0−1	Ermis Aradippou	Pafos
16:00 EEST (UTC+3)	Alabi (yellow card) 45+2'; Alba (yellow card) 64' (yellow-red card) 90+4'; Ayivi (yellow card) 90+2'	Report	Sîrghi (yellow card) 24'; Moulazimis (yellow card) 39'; Yiangoudakis 45+1' (yellow card) 70'; Weeks (yellow card) 63'; Vasilogiannis (yellow card) 74'	Stadium: Pafiako Stadium; Referee: Avraam Tsoukkas

8 May 2016 31	AEL Limassol	1−0	Pafos	Limassol
17:00 EEST (UTC+3)	Mesca 41'; Mavrou (yellow card) 53'; Kyriakou (yellow card) 90+3'	Report	Grgec (yellow card) 51'	Stadium: Tsirio Stadium; Referee: Leontios Trattos

15 May 2016 32	Pafos	1−1	Ethnikos Achna	Pafos
17:00 EEST (UTC+3)	Demosthenous 20' (yellow card) 33'; Khmaladze (yellow card) 64'; Alba (yellow card) 66'; Damahou (yellow card) 70'; Ioannou (yellow card) 83'	Report	Chadjivasilis 4'; Grigalashvili (yellow card) 6'; Iacob (yellow card) 29'; Arrabal (yellow card) 78'; Pincelli (yellow card) 83'	Stadium: Pafiako Stadium; Referee: Vasilis Demetriou

=== Cypriot Cup ===
6 January 2016 Second round 1st leg	Pafos	3−0	ASIL Lysi	Pafos
15:00 EET (UTC+2)	Maachi 5', 23'; Sielis 38'; Grgec (yellow card) 90'	Report	Andreou (yellow card) 76'	Stadium: Pafiako Stadium; Attendance: 150; Referee: Iakovos Tokkari

26 January 2016 Second round 2nd leg	ASIL Lysi	0−2 (0–5 agg.)	Pafos	Larnaca
15:00 EET (UTC+2)		Report	Alba 41'; Grgec (yellow card) 58'; Bodiong 70'	Stadium: Ammochostos Stadium; Attendance: 19; Referee: Andreas Argyrou

3 February 2016 Quarterfinal 1st leg	Omonia	4−0	Pafos	Nicosia
17:00 EET (UTC+2)	Schembri (yellow card) 22' (goal) 26'; Badibanga 29', 64'; Fylaktou (yellow card) 50'; Christofi 79'	Report	Bodiong (yellow card) 34'; Alabi (red card) 45'; Khmaladze (yellow card) 82'	Stadium: GSP Stadium; Attendance: 3,529; Referee: Giorgos Nicolaou

17 February 2016 Quarterfinal 1st leg	Pafos	0−4 (0–8 agg.)	Omonia	Pafos
17:00 EET (UTC+2)	Kasmi 40'; Okeuhie 42'; Hafez 64'; Kirm 68'	Report		Stadium: Pafiako Stadium; Attendance: 300; Referee: Avraam Tsoukkas

== Squad statistics ==
As of match played 15 May 2016

=== Appearances and goals ===
No.	Pos	Nat	Player	Total		Cyta Championship		Cypriot Cup	
No.	Pos	Nat	Player	Apps	Goals	Apps	Goals	Apps	Goals
1	GK	(Latvia) LAT	Jānis Krūmiņš	7	0	5+1	0	1	0
2	DF	(Nigeria) NGR	Rasheed Alabi	28	0	24	0	4	0
3	MF	(Ivory Coast) CIV	Joël Damahou	35	5	32+2	5	0+1	0
7	FW	(Portugal) POR	Ivan Forbes	35	0	29+3	0	3	0
8	MF	(Cyprus) CYP	Giorgos Sielis	8	3	1+6	2	0+1	1
10	MF	(Portugal) POR	Hugo Moutinho	21	3	13+7	3	0+1	0
11	FW	(Argentina) ARG	Miguel Alba	16	4	14	3	2	1
12	MF	(Cyprus) CYP	Tasos Makris	17	1	9+4	1	3+1	0
13	DF	(Portugal) POR	Carlos Marques	17	0	9+5	0	2+1	0
14	DF	(Cameroon) CMR	Éric Matoukou	13	1	13	1	0	0
16	FW	(Netherlands) NED	Nassir Maachi	32	13	29+2	11	0+1	2
17	MF	(Cyprus) CYP	Panagiotis Zachariou	8	0	4+4	0	0	0
21	DF	(Cyprus) CYP	Thomas Ioannou	37	0	33	0	2+2	0
23	MF	(Cameroon) CMR	Hervé Bodiong	11	2	0+7	1	3+1	1
31	FW	(Nigeria) NGR	Emmanuel Okoye	36	5	9+23	5	4	0
32	FW	(Cyprus) CYP	Charalambos Charalambous	1	0	0	0	0+1	0
33	DF	(Cyprus) CYP	Rolandos Michael	1	0	0	0	1	0
44	DF	(Croatia) CRO	Jurica Grgec	31	1	25+2	1	4	0
46	GK	(Spain) ESP	Jordi Codina	18	0	16	0	2	0
56	FW	(Cyprus) CYP	Charalambos Demosthenous	31	1	21+7	1	2+1	0
77	MF	(Cyprus) CYP	Fotis Sofokleous	1	0	0	0	0+1	0
88	MF	(Georgia (country)) GEO	Levan Khmaladze	34	2	29+2	2	1+2	0
90	GK	(Cyprus) CYP	Andreas Vassiliou	1	0	0	0	1	0
97	DF	(Cyprus) CYP	Stefanos Miller	4	0	1+1	0	2	0
95	FW	(Brazil) BRA	Ibson Melo	21	1	17+2	1	1+1	0
99	FW	(France) FRA	Hugues Ayivi	35	2	14+18	2	2+1	0
Players away on loan:
Players who appeared for Pafos but left during the season:
5	DF	(Georgia (country)) GEO	Gia Grigalava	16	1	16	1	0	0
9	FW	(Georgia (country)) GEO	Nikoloz Gelashvili	14	4	12+2	4	0	0
30	MF	(Georgia (country)) GEO	Elgujja Grigalashvili	13	2	6+7	2	0	0
89	GK	(Georgia (country)) GEO	Roin Kvaskhvadze	15	0	15	0	0	0

=== Goal scorers ===
Place	Position	Nation	Number	Name	Cyta Championship	Cypriot Cup	Total
1	FW	(Netherlands)	16	Nassir Maachi	11	2	13
2	MF	(Ivory Coast)	3	Joël Damahou	5	0	5
2	FW	(Nigeria)	31	Emmanuel Okoye	5	0	5
4	FW	(Georgia (country))	9	Nikoloz Gelashvili	4	0	4
4	FW	(Argentina)	11	Miguel Alba	3	1	4
6	MF	(Portugal)	10	Hugo Moutinho	3	0	3
6	MF	(Cyprus)	8	Giorgos Sielis	2	1	3
8	MF	(Georgia (country))	30	Elgujja Grigalashvili	2	0	2
8	MF	(Georgia (country))	88	Levan Khmaladze	2	0	2
8	FW	(France)	99	Hugues Ayivi	2	0	2
8	MF	(Cameroon)	23	Hervé Bodiong	1	1	2
13	DF	(Georgia (country))	5	Gia Grigalava	1	0	1
13	MF	(Cyprus)	12	Tasos Makris	1	0	1
13	DF	(Cameroon)	14	Éric Matoukou	1	0	1
13	DF	(Croatia)	44	Jurica Grgec	1	0	1
13	FW	(Cyprus)	56	Charalambos Demosthenous	1	0	1
13	FW	(Brazil)	95	Ibson Melo	1	0	1
Total					41	5	46

=== Clean sheets ===
Place	Position	Nation	Number	Name	Cyta Championship	Cypriot Cup	Total
1	GK	(Spain)	46	Jordi Codina	4	1	5
2	GK	(Georgia (country))	89	Roin Kvaskhvadze	4	0	4
3	GK	(Latvia)	1	Jānis Krūmiņš	1	1	2
Total					9	2	11

=== Disciplinary record ===
Number	Nation	Position	Name	Cyta Championship		Cypriot Cup		Total	
Number	Nation	Position	Name	Yellow card	Red card	Yellow card	Red card	Yellow card	Red card
2	(Nigeria)	DF	Rasheed Alabi	6	2	0	1	6	3
3	(Ivory Coast)	MF	Joël Damahou	5	0	0	0	5	0
7	(Portugal)	FW	Ivan Forbes	7	0	0	0	7	0
8	(Cyprus)	MF	Giorgos Sielis	2	0	0	0	2	0
10	(Portugal)	MF	Hugo Moutinho	3	0	0	0	3	0
11	(Argentina)	FW	Miguel Alba	8	1	0	0	8	1
12	(Cyprus)	DF	Tasos Makris	1	0	0	0	1	0
13	(Portugal)	DF	Carlos Marques	4	0	0	0	4	0
14	(Cameroon)	DF	Éric Matoukou	5	0	0	0	5	0
16	(Netherlands)	FW	Nassir Maachi	5	0	0	0	5	0
21	(Cyprus)	DF	Thomas Ioannou	6	0	0	0	6	0
23	(Cameroon)	MF	Hervé Bodiong	1	0	1	0	2	0
31	(Nigeria)	FW	Emmanuel Okoye	7	0	0	0	7	0
44	(Croatia)	DF	Jurica Grgec	7	0	2	0	9	0
46	(Spain)	GK	Jordi Codina	1	0	0	0	1	0
56	(Cyprus)	FW	Charalambos Demosthenous	1	0	0	0	1	0
88	(Georgia (country))	MF	Levan Khmaladze	8	1	1	0	9	1
99	(France)	FW	Hugues Ayivi	2	0	0	0	2	0
Players away on loan:
Players who left Pafos during the season:
5	(Georgia (country))	DF	Gia Grigalava	2	0	0	0	2	0
9	(Georgia (country))	FW	Nikoloz Gelashvili	5	0	0	0	5	0
89	(Georgia (country))	GK	Roin Kvaskhvadze	2	1	0	0	2	1
Total				88	5	4	1	92	6
