= 2018–19 Valletta F.C. season =

Professional football team's season

Valletta
2018–19 season
- Manager: Danilo Dončić, Gilbert Agius
- Premier League: 1st
- Champions League: First Qualifying Round
- Europa League: Second Qualifying Round
- FA Trophy: Runners-up
- BOV Super Cup: Winners
- Top goalscorer: League: Mario Fontanella (17); All: Mario Fontanella (23)

The 2018–19 season was Valletta's twenty-fifth title-winning season in the Maltese Premier League. With only four games remaining in the league and Valletta in a vital title race run-in, head coach Danilo Dončić stepped down from his role, citing personal reasons for his resignation. Assistant manager and former club captain Gilbert Agius was soon appointed as interim head coach for the remainder of the season. At the end of the season, Valletta and Hibernians finished off equal on 58 points; in the last matchday, Valletta were only a few minutes away from winning the title as they were leading 1–0 against Ħamrun Spartans, but a goal in stoppage time levelled the match. Hibernians had a convincing 5–1 win over Balzan to force a championship decider to be played between the two. Valletta also won their twelfth Super Cup and finished runners-up in the FA Trophy.

== UEFA Champions League ==
=== First qualifying round ===
| 11 July 2018 1st leg | Kukësi (Albania) | 0–0 | Valletta (Malta) | Shkodër, Albania |
| | | Report | Peña (yellow card) 21'; J. Zerafa (yellow card) 59'; R. Muscat (yellow card) 61'; Bonello (yellow card) 89' | Stadium: Loro Boriçi Stadium; Attendance: 350; Referee: Þóroddur Hjaltalín (Iceland) |

| 17 July 2018 2nd leg | Valletta (Malta) | 1–1 | Kukësi (Albania) | Ta' Qali, Malta |
| | J. Zerafa (yellow card) 8'; Santiago 67'; Alba (yellow card) 70' | Report | Zguro (yellow card) 39' (yellow-red card) 87'; Rumbullaku (yellow card) 78'; Dzaria 84'; Shameti (yellow card) 90+3' | Stadium: Centenary Stadium; Attendance: 1,307; Referee: Igor Pajač (Croatia) |

1–1 on aggregate; Kukësi won on away goals.

== UEFA Europa League ==
=== Second qualifying round ===
| 29 July 2018 1st leg | Zrinjski Mostar (Bosnia and Herzegovina) | 1–1 | Valletta (Malta) | Mostar, Bosnia and Herzegovina |
| | Todorović (yellow card) 43'; Bilbija 51'; Galić (yellow card) 52'; Barišić (yellow card) 81' | Report | Fontanella (yellow card) 35', (goal) 90'; Alba (yellow card) 60'; Gill (yellow card) 82'; Santiago (yellow card) 83' | Stadium: Stadion pod Bijelim Brijegom; Attendance: 3,100; Referee: Neil Doyle (Republic of Ireland) |

| 2 August 2018 2nd leg | Valletta (Malta) | 1–2 | Zrinjski Mostar (Bosnia and Herzegovina) | Ta' Qali, Malta |
| | S. Borg 56', (yellow card) 77'; Alba (yellow card) 76'; Zerafa (yellow card) 90+5' | Report | Barišić 31'; Galić (yellow card) 38' (yellow-red card) 50'; Jakovljević (yellow card) 55'; Filipović 66' | Stadium: Centenary Stadium; Attendance: 1,310; Referee: Rade Obrenovič (Slovenia) |

Zrinjski Mostar won 3–2 on aggregate.

== BOV Premier League ==
=== Results ===
| Match | Date | Opponent | Venue | Result | Attendance | Scorers | Report |
|---|---|---|---|---|---|---|---|
| 1 | 18 August 2018 | Sliema Wanderers | National Stadium | 0–3 | | | Report |
| 2 | 25 August 2018 | Hibernians | National Stadium | 2–1 | 1,486 | Alba 56' | Report |
| 3 | 16 September 2018 | Birkirkara | National Stadium | 3–0 | 2,567 | Kaljević 56', Fontanella 79', Gavrilă 84' | Report |
| 4 | 21 September 2018 | Qormi | National Stadium | 6–0 | 981 | Kaljević (2) 14', 72', Alba 58' (pen), Fontanella (2) 60', 81', Gavrilă 88' | Report |
| 5 | 28 September 2018 | Senglea Athletic | Victor Tedesco Stadium | 5–1 | 839 | Fontanella (2) 6', 26', Kaljević (3) 12', 14', 54' | Report |
| 6 | 5 October 2018 | Balzan | National Stadium | 4–1 | 1,124 | Fontanella (2) 44', 47', Kaljević 73', Peña 89' | Report |
| 7 | 20 October 2018 | Pietà Hotspurs | Centenary Stadium | 4–0 | | Fontanella (2) 11', 23', Kaljević 28', Alba 33' (pen) | Report |
| 8 | 27 October 2018 | Mosta | Victor Tedesco Stadium | 5–0 | | Fontanella 39', Alba (2) 45', 80', Piciollo 76' (pen), Gavrilă 85' | Report |
| 9 | 4 November 2018 | Floriana | National Stadium | 1–0 | | Alba 81' | Report |
| 10 | 9 November 2018 | Gżira United | National Stadium | 0–0 | 2,003 | | Report |
| 11 | 24 November 2018 | St. Andrews | Centenary Stadium | 1–0 | | Peña 75' | Report |
| 12 | 8 December 2018 | Tarxien Rainbows | Centenary Stadium | 7–0 | | Kaljević (2) 8', 59' (pen), Fontanella (3) 13', 41', 87', Piciollo 25', Saleh 35' | Report |
| 13 | 17 December 2018 | Ħamrun Spartans | National Stadium | 0–1 | 1,917 | | Report |
| 14 | 13 January 2019 | Sliema Wanderers | National Stadium | 2–1 | | S. Borg 34', Piciollo 90+4' | Report |
| 15 | 20 January 2019 | Hibernians | National Stadium | 2–1 | 2,722 | Santiago 48', Alba 84' (pen) | Report |
| 16 | 3 February 2019 | Birkirkara | National Stadium | 2–0 | 3,113 | Santiago 61', Gavrilă 90+2' | Report |
| 17 | 8 February 2019 | Qormi | National Stadium | 2–1 | 536 | Alba 24', Kaljević 28' | Report |
| 18 | 16 February 2019 | Senglea Athletic | Hibernians Stadium | 3–3 | | Piciollo 4', Mido 37' (o.g.), Nwoko 89' | Report |
| 19 | 1 March 2019 | Balzan | National Stadium | 2–1 | 671 | Fontanella 80', Caruana 86' | Report |
| 20 | 9 March 2019 | Pietà Hotspurs | National Stadium | 3–0 | | Fontanella 28', Santiago 36', Gavrilă 42' | Report |
| 21 | 13 March 2019 | Mosta | Centenary Stadium | 1–0 | 555 | Alba 6' | Report |
| 22 | 31 March 2019 | Floriana | National Stadium | 0–2 | 3,674 | | Report |
| 23 | 7 April 2019 | Gżira United | National Stadium | 1–1 | 1,402 | S. Borg 4' (pen) | Report |
| 24 | 14 April 2019 | St. Andrews | National Stadium | 4–0 | 983 | Fontanella 46', Nwoko 68', Calleja Cremona (2) 78' (o.g.), 84' (o.g.) | Report |
| 25 | 20 April 2019 | Tarxien Rainbows | National Stadium | 1–0 | 1,419 | Alba 28' | Report |
| 26 | 20 April 2019 | Ħamrun Spartans | National Stadium | 1–1 | 5,590 | Fontanella 30' | Report |

=== Championship play-off ===
| 4 May 2019 | Valletta (Malta) | 2–2 (a.e.t.) (4–2 p) | Hibernians (Malta) | Ta' Qali, Malta |
| 16:30 CEST | Alba (yellow card) 1'; Muscat (yellow card) 28'; Caruana 59'; Fontanella 98' | Report | N'Tow (yellow card) 2'; Taylon 12', (yellow card) 13'; Tiago Adan (yellow card) 13'; Agius (yellow card) 117'; Sahanek 120' | Stadium: National Stadium; Attendance: 9,544; Referee: Malcolm Spiteri (Malta) |
| | Penalties |
| | Miguel Alba (penalty scored); Santiago Malano (penalty scored); Bogdan Gavrilă (penalty scored); Mario Fontanella (penalty scored) | | (penalty missed) Marco Sahanek; (penalty scored) Jake Grech; (penalty scored) Tiago Adan; (penalty missed) Taylon |

=== League table ===
| Pos | Team | Pld | W | D | L | GF | GA | GD | Pts | Qualification or relegation |
|---|---|---|---|---|---|---|---|---|---|---|
| 1 | Valletta (Note: Valletta and Hibernians finished equal on points, and a championship play-off to determine the winner was won by Valletta) (C) | 26 | 18 | 4 | 4 | 61 | 18 | +43 | 58 | Qualification for the 2019–20 UEFA Champions League |
| 2 | Hibernians | 26 | 18 | 4 | 4 | 54 | 27 | +27 | 58 | Qualification for the 2019–20 UEFA Europa League |
| 3 | Gżira United | 26 | 13 | 11 | 2 | 42 | 21 | +21 | 50 | Qualification for the 2019–20 UEFA Europa League |
| 4 | Ħamrun Spartans | 26 | 12 | 10 | 4 | 35 | 20 | +15 | 46 | |
| 5 | Sliema Wanderers | 26 | 13 | 6 | 7 | 37 | 26 | +11 | 45 | |
| 6 | Balzan | 26 | 12 | 7 | 7 | 41 | 31 | +10 | 43 | Qualification for the 2019–20 UEFA Europa League (Note: Balzan qualified for the 2019–20 UEFA Europa League as the 2018–19 Maltese FA Trophy winners) |
| 7 | Birkirkara | 26 | 12 | 3 | 11 | 33 | 26 | +7 | 39 | |
| 8 | Floriana | 26 | 9 | 5 | 12 | 28 | 25 | +3 | 32 | |
| 9 | Mosta | 26 | 7 | 8 | 11 | 30 | 45 | −15 | 29 | |
| 10 | Tarxien Rainbows | 26 | 8 | 2 | 16 | 29 | 58 | −29 | 26 | |
| 11 | Senglea Athletic | 26 | 7 | 5 | 14 | 33 | 46 | −13 | 26 | |
| 12 | St. Andrews (R) | 26 | 7 | 3 | 16 | 25 | 45 | −20 | 24 | Qualification for the Relegation Play-Offs |
| 13 | Qormi (R) | 26 | 6 | 2 | 18 | 25 | 51 | −26 | 20 | Relegation to the 2019–20 Maltese First Division |
| 14 | Pietà Hotspurs (R) | 26 | 3 | 4 | 19 | 25 | 59 | −34 | 13 | Relegation to the 2019–20 Maltese First Division |

Source: Malta Football Association
Rules for classification: 1) Points; 2) Play-offs (only if needed to decide champions, teams for relegation or teams for UEFA competitions).
(C) Champions; (R) Relegated

== The FA Trophy ==
| Round | Date | Opponent | Venue | Result | Attendance | Scorers | Report |
|---|---|---|---|---|---|---|---|
| R3 | 2 December 2018 | Marsa | Centenary Stadium | 3–0 | | Borg 17', Alba 52' (pen), Piciollo 58' | Report |
| R4 | 27 January 2019 | Lija Athletic | Centenary Stadium | 7–1 | 551 | Caruana 10', Fontanella (2) 17' 67', Piciollo 19', Kaljević 50', Alba (2) 60', 71' | Report |
| Quarter-final | 8 May 2019 | Hibernians | National Stadium | 3–2 (a.e.t.) | 2,914 | Kaljević (2) 74', 103', Pulis 84' | Report |
| Semi-final | 12 May 2019 | Gżira United | National Stadium | 2–0 | 1,642 | Muscat 78', Gavrilă 90+1' | Report |
| Final | 18 May 2019 | Balzan | National Stadium | 4–4 (a.e.t.); 5-4 (p) | 4,024 | Peña (2) 41', 72', Fontanella 115' (pen), Muscat 119' | Report |

== BOV Super Cup ==
| 13 December 2018 | Valletta (Malta) | 2–1 | Balzan (Malta) | National Stadium |
| | Johnson 9' (o.g.); Kaljević (yellow card) 25'; Muscat (yellow card) 54'; Fontanella 79', (yellow card) 79'; Piciollo (yellow card) 90+4' | Report | Lecão 37', (yellow card) 37'; Cadú (yellow card) 63'; Božović (yellow card) 90+3'; Serrano (yellow card) 90+4' | Attendance: 2,241; Referee: Trustin Farrugia Cann (Malta) |

== Squad statistics ==
=== First Team ===
| No. | Pos. | Name | BOV Premier League | | UEFA Champions League | | UEFA Europa League | | The FA Trophy | | BOV Super Cup | | Championship Decider | | Total | | Discipline | |
| No. | Pos. | Name | Apps | Goals | Apps | Goals | Apps | Goals | Apps | Goals | Apps | Goals | Apps | Goals | Apps | Goals | Yellow card | Red card |
|---|---|---|---|---|---|---|---|---|---|---|---|---|---|---|---|---|---|---|
| 1 | GK | (Malta) Henry Bonello | 24 | 0 | 2 | 0 | 2 | 0 | 3 | 0 | 1 | 0 | 1 | 0 | 33 | 0 | 2 | 0 |
| 2 | DF | (Malta) Jonathan Caruana | 13(9) | 1 | 0 | 0 | 0 | 0 | 3 | 1 | 1 | 0 | 1 | 1 | 18(9) | 3 | 3 | 0 |
| 3 | DF | (Malta) Miguel Attard | 0 | 0 | 0 | 0 | 0 | 0 | 0 | 0 | 0 | 0 | 0 | 0 | 0 | 0 | 0 | 0 |
| 3 | FW | (Malta) Miguel Micallef | 0 | 0 | 0 | 0 | 0 | 0 | 0 | 0 | 0 | 0 | 0 | 0 | 0 | 0 | 0 | 0 |
| 4 | DF | (Malta) Steve Borg | 21(2) | 2 | 2 | 0 | 2 | 1 | 3 | 0 | 1 | 0 | 1 | 0 | 30(2) | 3 | 10 | 0 |
| 5 | DF | (Malta) Ryan Camilleri | 20(1) | 0 | 2 | 0 | 2 | 0 | 2 | 0 | 0 | 0 | 0(1) | 0 | 26(2) | 0 | 2 | 0 |
| 6 | DF | (Argentina) Juan Cruz Gill | 1 | 0 | 0(2) | 0 | 0(2) | 0 | 0 | 0 | 0 | 0 | 0 | 0 | 1(4) | 0 | 2 | 0 |
| 6 | - | (Malta) George Scerri | 0 | 0 | 0 | 0 | 0 | 0 | 0 | 0 | 0 | 0 | 0 | 0 | 0 | 0 | 0 | 0 |
| 6 | MF | (Italy) Antonio Monticelli | 1(3) | 0 | 0 | 0 | 0 | 0 | 1(1) | 0 | 0 | 0 | 0(1) | 0 | 2(5) | 0 | 2 | 0 |
| 8 | MF | (Argentina) Santiago Malano | 25 | 3 | 2 | 1 | 2 | 0 | 5 | 0 | 1 | 0 | 1 | 0 | 36 | 4 | 4 | 0 |
| 9 | FW | (Malta) Russell Fenech | 0 | 0 | 0 | 0 | 0 | 0 | 0(1) | 0 | 0 | 0 | 0 | 0 | 0(1) | 0 | 0 | 0 |
| 9 | MF | (Malta) Jeremy Micallef | 0 | 0 | 0 | 0 | 0 | 0 | 0(2) | 0 | 0 | 0 | 0 | 0 | 0(2) | 0 | 0 | 0 |
| 10 | FW | (Italy) Matteo Piciollo | 15(3) | 4 | 2 | 0 | 2 | 0 | 2 | 2 | 1 | 0 | 0 | 0 | 22(3) | 6 | 2 | 0 |
| 11 | MF | (Malta) Shaun Dimech | 0(1) | 0 | 0 | 0 | 0 | 0 | 0(4) | 0 | 0 | 0 | 0 | 0 | 0(5) | 0 | 0 | 0 |
| 14 | FW | (Malta) Kyrian Nwoko | 7(13) | 2 | 0(2) | 0 | 1(1) | 0 | 3(1) | 0 | 0(1) | 0 | 1 | 0 | 12(18) | 2 | 2 | 0 |
| 16 | DF | (Malta) Jean Borg | 9(12) | 0 | 0(1) | 0 | 0(2) | 0 | 4 | 1 | 0(1) | 0 | 1 | 0 | 14(16) | 1 | 1 | 0 |
| 18 | DF | (Dominican Republic) Enmy Peña | 23(1) | 2 | 2 | 0 | 0 | 0 | 5 | 2 | 1 | 0 | 1 | 0 | 32(1) | 4 | 5 | 0 |
| 19 | DF | (Malta) Joseph Zerafa | 21(1) | 0 | 2 | 0 | 2 | 0 | 0(1) | 0 | 0 | 0 | 0 | 0 | 25(2) | 0 | 11 | 1 |
| 20 | MF | (Oman) Raed Ibrahim Saleh | 14(2) | 1 | 2 | 0 | 2 | 0 | 5 | 0 | 1 | 0 | 0 | 0 | 24(2) | 1 | 5 | 1 |
| 22 | MF | (Malta) Nicholas Pulis | 0(8) | 0 | 0 | 0 | 0 | 0 | 1(4) | 1 | 0(1) | 0 | 0 | 0 | 1(13) | 1 | 2 | 0 |
| 23 | FW | (Malta) Ryan Tonna | 0 | 0 | 0 | 0 | 0 | 0 | 0 | 0 | 0 | 0 | 0 | 0 | 0 | 0 | 0 | 0 |
| 24 | MF | (Malta) Rowen Muscat | 19 | 0 | 2 | 0 | 2 | 0 | 3 | 2 | 1 | 0 | 1 | 0 | 28 | 2 | 8 | 0 |
| 27 | FW | (Argentina) Miguel Alba | 23(1) | 10 | 2 | 0 | 2 | 0 | 2 | 3 | 1 | 0 | 1 | 0 | 31(1) | 13 | 11 | 0 |
| 32 | GK | (Malta) Andre Spiteri | 0 | 0 | 0 | 0 | 0 | 0 | 0 | 0 | 0 | 0 | 0 | 0 | 0 | 0 | 0 | 0 |
| 33 | DF | (Malta) Kurt Desira | 0 | 0 | 0 | 0 | 0 | 0 | 0 | 0 | 0 | 0 | 0 | 0 | 0 | 0 | 0 | 0 |
| 35 | MF | (Malta) Joshua Micallef | 0 | 0 | 0 | 0 | 0 | 0 | 0 | 0 | 0 | 0 | 0 | 0 | 0 | 0 | 0 | 0 |
| 35 | MF | (Malta) Kenley Scerri | 0 | 0 | 0 | 0 | 0 | 0 | 0 | 0 | 0 | 0 | 0 | 0 | 0 | 0 | 0 | 0 |
| 41 | GK | (Malta) Yenz Cini | 2(1) | 0 | 0 | 0 | 0 | 0 | 2 | 0 | 0 | 0 | 0 | 0 | 4(1) | 0 | 0 | 0 |
| 77 | FW | (Romania) Bogdan Gavrilă | 6(11) | 5 | 0(1) | 0 | 1(1) | 0 | 1(2) | 1 | 0 | 0 | 0(1) | 0 | 8(16) | 6 | 3 | 1 |
| 77 | FW | (Tunisia) Zied Soussi | 0(1) | 0 | 0 | 0 | 0 | 0 | 1 | 0 | 0 | 0 | 0 | 0 | 1(1) | 0 | 0 | 0 |
| 86 | FW | (Montenegro) Bojan Kaljević | 16(2) | 11 | 0 | 0 | 0 | 0 | 4 | 3 | 1 | 0 | 1 | 0 | 22(2) | 14 | 6 | 0 |
| 89 | FW | (Italy) Mario Fontanella | 26 | 17 | 2 | 0 | 2 | 1 | 5 | 3 | 1 | 1 | 1 | 1 | 37 | 23 | 3 | 0 |

== Transfers ==
=== In ===
| Date | Pos. | Name | From | Fee | Ref. |
|---|---|---|---|---|---|
| 12 May 2018 | FW | (Italy) Mario Fontanella | (Malta) Floriana | Free | |
| 14 June 2018 | GK | (Malta) Yenz Cini | (Malta) St. Andrews | Free | |
| 5 July 2018 | FW | (Romania) Bogdan Gavrilă | (Romania) CSM Poli Iași | Free | |
| 15 July 2018 | MF | (Malta) Joshua Micallef | (Malta) Msida St. Joseph | Free | |
| 1 August 2018 | DF | (Malta) Kurt Desira | (Malta) San Ġwann | Free | |
| 20 August 2018 | FW | (Albania) Ildi Gruda | (Albania) KF Vllaznia | Free | |
| 31 August 2018 | FW | (Montenegro) Bojan Kaljević | (Malta) Balzan | Free | |
| 15 October 2018 | FW | (Tunisia) Zied Soussi | (Tunisia) US Monastir | Free | |
| 17 January 2019 | MF | (Italy) Antonio Monticelli | (Malta) Ħamrun Spartans | Free | |

=== Out ===
| Date | Pos. | Name | To | Fee | Ref. |
|---|---|---|---|---|---|
| 6 June 2018 | MF | (Nigeria) Uchenna Umeh | (Malta) Birkirkara | Free | |
| 10 June 2018 | FW | (Malta) Michael Mifsud | (Malta) Birkirkara | Free | |
| 18 June 2018 | MF | (Italy) Claudio Pani | (Malta) Sliema Wanderers | Free | |
| 12 July 2018 | MF | (Malta) Dario Tabone | (Malta) Vittoriosa Stars | Free | |
| 20 July 2018 | DF | (Brazil) Romeu | (Malta) Mosta | Free | |
| 1 August 2018 | DF | (Malta) Leonard Farrugia | (Malta) Mqabba | Free | |
| 8 August 2018 | FW | (Estonia) Albert Prosa | (Finland) TPS | Free | |
| 30 January 2019 | FW | (Tunisia) Zied Soussi | Unattached | Released | |
| 31 May 2019 | MF | (Romania) Bogdan Gavrilă | Unattached | Released | |
| 31 May 2019 | FW | (Albania) Ildi Gruda | Unattached | Released | |
| 31 May 2019 | GK | (Malta) Andre Spiteri | Unattached | Released | |

=== Loan in ===
| Date from | Date to | Pos. | Name | To | Ref. |
|---|---|---|---|---|---|
| 10 September 2018 | 31 May 2020 | DF | (Malta) Matthias Ablett | (Malta) Qormi | |

=== Loan out ===
| Date from | Date to | Pos. | Name | To | Ref. |
|---|---|---|---|---|---|
| 3 June 2018 | 30 April 2019 | GK | (Malta) Nicky Vella | (Malta) Pietà Hotspurs | |
| 1 July 2018 | 30 April 2019 | MF | (Malta) Cleavon Frendo | (Malta) Marsaxlokk | |
| 27 July 2018 | 30 April 2019 | FW | (Malta) Terence Scerri | (Malta) Żurrieq | |
| 1 August 2018 | 30 April 2019 | MF | (Malta) Bjorn Bondin | (Malta) Qrendi | |
| 1 August 2018 | 31 May 2019 | MF | (Malta) Jurgen Suda | (Malta) Santa Lucia | |
| 13 August 2018 | 30 April 2019 | DF | (Malta) Brandon Grech | (Malta) Mqabba | |
| 20 August 2018 | 30 April 2019 | GK | (Malta) Maverick Buhagiar | (Malta) Tarxien Rainbows | |
| 24 August 2018 | 30 April 2019 | DF | (Malta) Fabio Muscat | (Malta) Msida St. Joseph | |
| 1 September 2018 | 30 April 2019 | DF | (Malta) Jake Borg | (Malta) Mellieħa | |
| 25 September 2018 | 30 April 2019 | DF | (Malta) Paul Chircop | (Malta) Pembroke Athleta | |
| 2 October 2018 | 31 May 2019 | DF | (Malta) Miguel Attard | (Malta) Gudja United | |
| 9 January 2019 | 30 April 2019 | FW | (Malta) Russell Fenech | (Malta) Sirens | |
| 17 January 2019 | 30 April 2019 | DF | (Argentina) Juan Cruz Gill | (Malta) Tarxien Rainbows | |
| 22 January 2019 | 31 May 2019 | DF | (Malta) Clivert Sciberras | (Malta) Mqabba | |
