= 2018–19 Maltese Premier League =

Maltese Premier League
- Season: 2018–19
- Dates: 17 August 2018 – 5 May 2019
- Champions: Valletta (25th title)
- Relegated: St. Andrews; Qormi; Pietà Hotspurs
- Champions League: Valletta
- Europa League: Hibernians; Gżira United; Balzan
- Matches: 182
- Goals: 495 (2.72 per match)
- Top goalscorer: Taylon Nicolas Correa (18 goals)
- Biggest home win: Valletta 6–0 Qormi (21 September 2018)
- Biggest away win: Tarxien Rainbows 0–7 Valletta (8 December 2018)
- Highest scoring: Tarxien Rainbows 0–7 Valletta (8 December 2018)
- All statistics correct as of 4 May 2019.

The 2018–19 Maltese Premier League was the 104th season of top-flight league football in Malta. The season began on 17 August 2018 and ended in April 2019. Defending champions Valletta won their 25th title, following a penalty shootout win against Hibernians in a championship decider match.

== Teams ==
Location of teams in 2018–19 Maltese Premier League

Lija Athletic and Naxxar Lions were relegated after they finished thirteenth and fourteenth the previous season. They are replaced by Qormi and Pietà Hotspurs, the 2017–18 Maltese First Division champions and runners-up respectively. Tarxien Rainbows retained Premiership status by defeating Żejtun Corinthians in a play-off decider.

Team	In league since	City	Training Stadium	Capacity
Balzan	2011–12	Balzan	St. Aloysius Sports and Recreational Complex	100
Birkirkara	1990–91	Birkirkara	Mġarr Ground	0
Floriana	1986–87	Floriana	Independence Arena	0
Gżira United	2016–17	Gżira	Gżira Football Ground	0
Ħamrun Spartans	2016–17	Ħamrun	Victor Tedesco Stadium	6,000
Hibernians	1945–46	Paola	Hibernians Ground	2,968
Mosta	2011–12	Mosta	Charles Abela Memorial Stadium	600
Pietà Hotspurs	2018–19	Pietà	Trinity Stadium	
Qormi	2018–19	Qormi	Thomaso Ground	500
Senglea Athletic	2017–18	Senglea	Ta' Qali National Stadium	17,797
Tarxien Rainbows	2008–09	Tarxien	Tony Cassar Sports Ground	1,000
Sliema Wanderers	1984–85	Sliema	Tigne Sports Complex	1,000
St. Andrews	2015–16	St. Andrew's	Luxol Stadium	800
Valletta	1944–45	Valletta	Sirens Stadium	600

=== Personnel and kits ===
Team	Manager	Kit manufacturer	Shirt sponsor
Balzan	(Malta) Jacques Scerri	Joma	Investors Mutual Limited
Birkirkara	(Malta) John Buttigieg	Adidas	McDonald's
Floriana	(Italy) Guido Ugolotti	Joma	Scotts Supermarket, Guess?
Gżira United	(Malta) Jesmond Zerafa	Joma	Jeep
Ħamrun Spartans	(Italy) Giovanni Tedesco	Sportika SA	
Hibernians	(Italy) Stefano Sanderra	Joma	Bezzina
Mosta	(England) Mark Miller	Macron	Dimbros, Nilmar
Pietà Hotspurs	(Malta) Ramon Zammit	Nike	Famalco.net
Qormi	(Malta) Matthew Psaila	Macron	
Senglea Athletic	(Italy) Enzo Potenza	Macron	Palumbo
Sliema Wanderers	(Italy) Stefano Maccoppi	Adidas	DIZZ, DSM Sports
St. Andrews	(Malta) Michael Woods	Macron	
Tarxien Rainbows	(Malta) Jose Borg	Erreà	Cassar Ship Repairs
Valletta	(Malta) Gilbert Agius (caretaker)	Joma	Iniala

- Additionally, referee kits are made by Adidas, sponsored by TeamSports and FXDD, and Nike has a new match ball.

== Venues ==
2018–19 Maltese Premier League is located in Malta	Ta' Qali	Ta' Qali	Paola	Hamrun
2018–19 Maltese Premier League is located in Malta	Ta' Qali National Stadium	Centenary Stadium	Tony Bezzina Stadium	Victor Tedesco Stadium
2018–19 Maltese Premier League is located in Malta	Capacity: 16,997	Capacity: 3,000	Capacity: 2,968	Capacity: 1,962

=== Managerial changes ===
Team	Outgoing manager	Manner of departure	Date of vacancy	Position in table	Replaced by	Date of appointment
Ħamrun Spartans	(Malta) Jacques Scerri	Mutual consent	31 May 2018	Pre-season	(Italy) Giovanni Tedesco	31 May 2018
Hibernians	(Malta) Mario Muscat (Malta) Neil Zarb Cousin	End of caretaker	4 July 2018	Pre-season	(Italy) Stefano Sanderra	4 July 2018
Senglea Athletic	(Malta) Steve D'Amato	End of contract	30 June 2018	Pre-season	(Italy) Bruno Russo	17 July 2018
Floriana	(Argentina) Nicolás Chiesa	Sacked	27 August 2018	12th	(Belgium) Luís Oliveira	29 August 2018
Senglea Athletic	(Italy) Bruno Russo	Sacked	15 September 2018	13th	(Italy) Enzo Potenza	20 September 2018
Qormi	(Malta) Brian Spiteri	Resigned	6 November 2018	13th	(Malta) Matthew Psaila	
Floriana	(Belgium) Luís Oliveira	Sacked	14 November 2018	9th	(Italy) Guido Ugolotti	14 November 2018
Mosta	(Italy) Enrico Piccioni	Sacked	16 November 2018	12th	(England) Mark Miller	22 November 2018
Sliema Wanderers	(Malta) John Buttigieg	Sacked	26 January 2019	6th	(Italy) Stefano Maccoppi	11 February 2019
Balzan	(Serbia) Marko Mićović	Resigned	3 February 2019	6th	(Malta) Jacques Scerri	5 February 2019
Gżira United	(Malta) Darren Abdilla	Resigned	12 February 2019	3rd	(Malta) Jesmond Zerafa	12 February 2019
Birkirkara	(Malta) Paul Zammit	Resigned	26 March 2019	7th	(Malta) John Buttigieg	18 April 2019
Valletta	(Serbia) Danilo Dončić	Resigned	8 April 2019	1st	(Malta) Gilbert Agius (caretaker)	8 April 2019

== League table ==
Pos	Team	Pld	W	D	L	GF	GA	GD	Pts	Qualification or relegation
1	Valletta (Note: Valletta and Hibernians finished equal on points, and a championship play-off to determine the winner was won by Valletta) (C)	26	18	4	4	61	18	+43	58	Qualification for the 2019–20 UEFA Champions League
2	Hibernians	26	18	4	4	54	27	+27	58	Qualification for the 2019–20 UEFA Europa League
3	Gżira United	26	13	11	2	42	21	+21	50	Qualification for the 2019–20 UEFA Europa League
4	Ħamrun Spartans	26	12	10	4	35	20	+15	46	
5	Sliema Wanderers	26	13	6	7	37	26	+11	45	
6	Balzan	26	12	7	7	41	31	+10	43	Qualification for the 2019–20 UEFA Europa League (Note: Balzan qualified for the 2019–20 UEFA Europa League as the 2018–19 Maltese FA Trophy winners)
7	Birkirkara	26	12	3	11	33	26	+7	39	
8	Floriana	26	9	5	12	28	25	+3	32	
9	Mosta	26	7	8	11	30	45	−15	29	
10	Tarxien Rainbows	26	8	2	16	29	58	−29	26	
11	Senglea Athletic	26	7	5	14	33	46	−13	26	
12	St. Andrews (R)	26	7	3	16	25	45	−20	24	Qualification for the Relegation Play-Offs
13	Qormi (R)	26	6	2	18	25	51	−26	20	Relegation to the 2019–20 Maltese First Division
14	Pietà Hotspurs (R)	26	3	4	19	25	59	−34	13	Relegation to the 2019–20 Maltese First Division

Source: Malta Football Association
Rules for classification: 1) Points; 2) Play-offs (only if needed to decide champions, teams for relegation or teams for UEFA competitions).
(C) Champions; (R) Relegated

== Results ==
Home \ Away	BAL	BIR	FLO	GŻI	ĦAM	HIB	MOS	PIE	QOR	SEN	SLI	STA	TAR	VAL
Balzan	—	0–0	2–0	0–0	2–2	2–2	3–1	1–0	4–2	1–2	2–1	0–2	2–0	1–2
Birkirkara	1–0	—	0–0	1–2	0–1	2–3	1–2	3–0	2–1	2–3	2–0	2–0	2–0	0–3
Floriana	0–0	0–2	—	0–1	1–1	0–1	1–0	1–2	0–1	4–1	0–1	0–1	4–0	2–0
Gżira United	3–0	1–1	1–0	—	0–0	3–2	3–3	5–2	1–0	3–1	1–1	2–1	1–1	0–0
Ħamrun Spartans	1–1	2–1	2–0	1–1	—	1–1	0–1	3–2	2–1	1–0	0–0	1–0	3–0	1–1
Hibernians	5–1	2–1	0–2	1–0	2–1	—	1–1	2–1	1–3	2–0	2–2	2–0	5–0	1–2
Mosta	0–0	0–3	3–3	1–1	0–0	0–4	—	3–2	2–0	0–3	1–2	1–3	3–1	0–1
Pietà Hotspurs	0–3	1–2	0–2	1–1	0–2	0–2	3–1	—	0–2	1–1	0–3	3–1	0–3	0–4
Qormi	1–3	1–0	1–3	1–4	0–2	1–2	1–1	2–2	—	1–0	2–3	0–2	1–2	1–2
Senglea Athletic	0–5	0–2	0–1	0–1	2–2	0–2	0–2	2–1	4–0	—	0–2	5–0	1–2	1–5
Sliema Wanderers	1–3	0–1	1–1	0–2	2–1	0–1	3–1	2–1	2–0	0–0	—	1–1	3–1	3–0
St. Andrews	0–1	2–0	3–0 (Note: St. Andrew's were awarded a 3–0 win after the Malta Football Association's Protests Board upheld their protest as Floriana didn't have 11 homegrown players in their squad. Originally, the match ended in a 0–0 draw.)	1–0	0–3	1–2	1–1	3–3	0–2	1–2	0–2	—	1–5	0–4
Tarxien Rainbows	1–3	0–2	0–3	1–4	2–1	2–4	0–2	2–0	1–0	2–2	1–2	2–1	—	0–7
Valletta	4–1	2–0	1–0	1–1	0–1	1–2	5–0	3–0	6–0	3–3	2–0	1–0	1–0	—

Source: Malta Football Association
Legend: Blue = home team win; Yellow = draw; Red = away team win.
For upcoming matches, an "a" indicates there is an article about the rivalry between the two participants.

=== Positions by round ===
The table lists the positions of teams after each week of matches. In order to preserve chronological evolvements, any postponed matches are not included to the round at which they were originally scheduled, but added to the full round they were played immediately afterwards.

Leader and 2019–20 UEFA Champions League first qualifying round
2019–20 UEFA Europa League first qualifying round
2019–20 UEFA Europa League preliminary round
Relegation play-offs
Relegation to First Division

Team ╲ Round	1	2	3	4	5	6	7	8	9	10	11	12	13	14	15	16	17	18	19	20	21	22	23	24	25	26
Valletta	14	14	10	6	4	3	3	2	2	3	3	2	3	3	1	1	1	2	2	1	1	1	2	1	1	1
Hibernians	6	2	6	9	5	5	5	3	3	2	2	1	2	1	2	2	2	1	1	2	2	2	1	2	2	2
Gżira United	1	4	1	1	1	1	1	1	1	1	1	3	1	2	3	3	3	3	3	3	3	3	3	3	3	3
Ħamrun Spartans	3	5	2	5	7	7	7	6	5	6	6	6	5	4	6	4	4	4	5	6	5	4	4	4	4	4
Sliema Wanderers	2	1	5	3	3	2	2	4	4	4	4	5	4	6	7	7	7	6	4	4	4	6	5	5	5	5
Balzan	8	7	3	2	2	4	4	5	6	5	5	4	7	7	5	6	6	5	7	7	7	7	6	6	5	6
Birkirkara	5	3	7	4	6	8	6	7	7	7	7	7	6	5	4	5	5	7	6	5	6	5	7	7	7	7
Floriana	11	12	11	11	9	6	8	8	10	9	10	10	8	9	9	9	9	10	9	8	8	8	8	8	8	8
Mosta	12	8	4	8	9	9	10	12	12	12	12	12	11	11	11	11	12	8	8	9	9	9	9	9	9	9
Tarxien Rainbows	13	6	9	7	10	10	11	10	9	10	8	8	9	10	8	8	8	9	10	10	10	10	10	10	10	10
Senglea Athletic	10	13	14	14	14	14	14	14	14	14	14	14	14	13	13	12	11	12	12	12	11	11	11	11	11	11
St. Andrews	4	10	12	12	12	11	9	9	8	8	9	9	10	8	10	10	10	11	11	11	12	12	12	12	12	12
Qormi	7	9	8	10	11	13	13	13	13	13	13	13	13	14	14	14	14	13	14	13	13	13	14	13	13	13
Pietà Hotspurs	9	11	13	13	13	12	12	11	11	11	11	11	12	12	12	13	13	14	13	14	14	14	13	14	14	14

Updated to match(es) played on 27 April 2019. Source: Scoresway

== Championship play-off ==
At the end of the season, Valletta and Hibernians finished off equal on 58 points; in the last matchday, Valletta were few minutes away from winning the title as they were leading 1–0 against Ħamrun Spartans, but a goal in stoppage time levelled the match. Hibernians had a convincing 5–1 win over Balzan to force a championship decider to be played between the two on 4 May.

4 May 2019	Valletta	2–2 (a.e.t.) (4–2 p)	Hibernians	Ta' Qali
16:30 CEST	Jonathan Caruana 59'; Mario Fontanella 98'	Report	Taylon Correa 12'; Marco Sahanek 118'	Stadium: Ta' Qali National Stadium; Attendance: 9,544; Referee: Malcolm Spiteri; Man of the Match: Taylon Nicolas Correa (Hibernians)
	Penalties
	Miguel Alba (penalty scored); Santiago Malano (penalty scored); Bogdan Gavrila (penalty scored); Mario Fontanella (penalty scored)		(penalty missed) Marco Sahanek; (penalty scored) Jake Grech; (penalty scored) Tiago Fonseca; (penalty missed) Taylon Nicolas Correa

- Valletta qualified for the 2019–20 UEFA Champions League First qualifying round.
- Hibernians qualified for the 2019–20 UEFA Europa League First qualifying round.

== Relegation play-offs ==
A play-off match took place between the twelfth-placed team from the Premier League, St. Andrews, and the third-placed team from the First Division, St. Lucia, for a place in the 2019–20 Maltese Premier League. St. Lucia became the first First Division club to win a Premier League play-off, thereby booking a place in next season's Premier League for the first time in their history.

5 May 2019	St. Andrews (1)	1–4	St. Lucia (2)	Paola
16:00 CEST	Martin Davis 12'	Report	Patrick Jean 10', 75' (pen.); Jackson Mendonza 17', 60'	Stadium: Hibernians Stadium; Referee: Etienne Antoine Mangion

== Season statistics ==
=== Top goalscorers ===
As of 5 May 2019

Rank	Player	Club	Goals
1	(Brazil) Taylon Nicolas Correa	Hibernians	18
2	(Italy) Mario Fontanella	Valletta	17
3	(Nigeria) Haruna Garba	Gżira United	12
4	(Montenegro) Bojan Kaljević	Valletta	11
4	(Brazil) Tiago Adan	Hibernians	11
4	(Malta) Jake Grech	Hibernians	11
7	(Serbia) Andrija Majdevac	Balzan	10
7	(Argentina) Miguel Alba	Valletta	10
9	(Malta) Alfred Effiong	Balzan	9
10	(Morocco) Younes Bnou Marzouk	Sliema Wanderers	8
10	(Italy) Kevin Tulimieri	Ħamrun Spartans	8
10	(Argentina) Augusto Cáseres	Senglea Athletic	8

=== Hat-tricks ===
Player	For	Against	Result	Date
(Jamaica) Kevaun Atkinson	St. Andrews	Mosta	3–1	18 August 2018
(Montenegro) Bojan Kaljević	Valletta	Senglea Athletic	5–1	28 September 2018
(Nigeria) Haruna Garba	Gżira United	Balzan	3–0	27 October 2018
(Italy) Mario Fontanella	Valletta	Tarxien Rainbows	7–0	8 December 2018
(Brazil) Diego Venancio	Senglea Athletic	St. Andrews	5–0	14 March 2019
(Cameroon) Justin Mengolo	Gżira United	Pietà Hotspurs	5–2	30 March 2019
(Brazil) Taylon Nicolas Correa	Hibernians	Balzan	5–1	27 April 2019

== Awards ==
=== Monthly awards ===
Month	Player of the Month	
Month	Player	Club
August	(Italy) Michele Paolucci	Tarxien Rainbows
September	(Montenegro) Bojan Kaljević	Valletta
October	(Italy) Mario Fontanella	Valletta
November	(Jamaica) Martin Davis	St. Andrews
December	(Brazil) Taylon Correa	Hibernians
January	(Argentina) Augusto Cáseres	Senglea Athletic
February	(France) Wilfried Domoraud	Ħamrun Spartans
March	(Morocco) Younes Bnou Marzouk	Sliema Wanderers
April/May	(Malta) Jake Grech	Hibernians

=== Annual awards ===
Award	Winner	Club
MFA Footballer of the Year	(Malta) Andrei Agius	Hibernians
Coach of the Year	(Italy) Stefano Sanderra	Hibernians
Young Player of the Year	(Malta) Matthew Guillaumier	Birkirkara
Foreign Player of the Year	(Argentina) Miguel Alba	Valletta
Best Goal Award	(Malta) Jurgen Degabriele (vs Floriana)	Hibernians
Best Fans Award		Valletta
