= Kaljević =

Kaljević is a surname. Notable people with the surname include:

- Bojan Kaljević (born 1986), Montenegrin footballer
- Ljubomir Kaljević (1841–1907), Serbian politician and academic
