= Thomas Ioannou =

Cypriot footballer (born 1995)

Personal information
- Date of birth: 19 July 1995 (age 31)
- Place of birth: Paphos, Cyprus
- Height: 1.77 m (5 ft 10 in)
- Position: Left back

Team information
- Current team: Akritas Chlorakas
- Number: 19

Senior career*
Years	Team	Apps	(Gls)
2013–2014	AEP Paphos	26	(1)
2014–2016	Pafos	50	(3)
2016–2021	AEK Larnaca	61	(1)
2017–2018	Doxa Katokopias (loan)	26	(1)
2021–2022	Ethnikos Achna	30	(0)
2022–2023	Olympiakos Nicosia	22	(0)
2024–	Akritas Chlorakas	47	(0)

International career^{‡}
2011–2013	Cyprus U17	3	(0)
2013–2015	Cyprus U19	4	(0)
2015	Cyprus U21	4	(0)
2020–	Cyprus	5	(0)
- * Club domestic league appearances and goals as of 14 June 2026 ‡ National team caps and goals as of 10 October 2020

Thomas Ioannou (Greek: Θωμάς Ιωάννου, born 19 July 1995) is a Cypriot footballer who plays as a left back for Akritas Chlorakas.

== International career ==
He made his national team debut on 10 October 2020 in a Nations League game against Luxembourg.
