= Bogdan Gavrilă =

Romanian footballer

Personal information
- Full name: Bogdan Cătălin Gavrilă
- Date of birth: 6 February 1992 (age 34)
- Place of birth: Galaţi, Romania
- Height: 1.80 m (5 ft 11 in)
- Positions: Winger; forward

Team information
- Current team: Tonara
- Number: 7

Youth career
- 2000–2006: Dunărea Galați
- 2006–2009: Școala de Fotbal Gheorghe Popescu
- 2009: Roma
- 2010: Lecce

Senior career*
Years	Team	Apps	(Gls)
2010–2013	Chindia Târgoviște	34	(2)
2013–2014	Oțelul Galați	8	(0)
2014–2016	Dinamo București	40	(4)
2016	→ Petrolul Ploiești (loan)	13	(1)
2016–2017	Ethnikos Achna	20	(0)
2018	Politehnica Iași	3	(0)
2018–2019	Valletta	19	(5)
2019	Petrolul Ploiești	11	(1)
2020	Gloria Buzău	2	(0)
2020–2021	Oțelul Galați	15	(10)
2021–2022	Sirens	25	(8)
2022–2023	Dinamo București	0	(0)
2023	NEROCA	4	(0)
2024	Budoni		
2025	San Luca		
2025–	Tonara	7	(3)
- * Club domestic league appearances and goals as of 27 January 2026

Bogdan Cătălin Gavrilă (born 6 February 1992) is a Romanian professional footballer who plays as a winger for Promozione Sardinia club Tonara.

== Career ==
At youth level Gavrilă played for important names in Italy like Roma or Lecce and at senior level he played in Liga I for Oțelul Galați, Dinamo București, Petrolul Ploiești and Politehnica Iași, in Cyprus for Ethnikos Achna and in Malta for Sirens.

== Honours ==
Chindia Târgoviște

- Liga III: 2010–11

Valletta

- Maltese Premier League: 2018–19
- Maltese FA Trophy runner-up: 2018–19
- Maltese Super Cup: 2019

Oțelul Galați

- Liga III: 2020–21
