= Martin Davis (Jamaican footballer) =

Jamaican footballer (born 1996)

Personal information
- Full name: Martin George Edward Davis
- Date of birth: 11 October 1996 (age 30)
- Place of birth: Jamaica
- Height: 1.65 m (5 ft 5 in)
- Position: Midfielder

Team information
- Current team: Gżira United
- Number: 91

Youth career
- 2008–2015: Harbour View
- 2009–2012: Valencia
- 2012–2013: Sagunto FC
- 2015–2016: Toronto FC

Senior career*
Years	Team	Apps	(Gls)
2015	Toronto FC III	14	(4)
2015–2017	Toronto FC II	11	(1)
2017–2018	Harbour View	3	(0)
2017–2018	→ St. Andrews (loan)	14	(0)
2018-2019	St. Andrews	27	(7)
2019–	Gżira United	45	(12)
2022	→ Sliema Wanderers (loan)	7	(0)

International career^{‡}
2012–2013	Jamaica U17	4	(0)
2015	Jamaica U20	5	(0)
- * Club domestic league appearances and goals as of 25 June 2023 ‡ National team caps and goals as of 3 October 2018

Martin Davis (born 11 October 1996) is a Jamaican footballer who currently plays for Gżira United F.C. in the Maltese Premier League.

== Career ==
=== College and amateur ===
Davis joined Harbour View aged 12, and a year later was awarded a summer scholarship with Spanish club Valencia following his performances at the Nexter Generation Valencia CF Easter Football Camp in Jamaica. He had a two-year orientation with the European club, and it was there he was converted from a forward into a midfielder.

He represented Harbour View in both Junior and Premier Leagues, as well as the Manning Cup at St. George's College during high school. However, he was forced to miss the entire 2014 season due to injury.

He also played for Caxton College and Sagunto FC during his youth career. Davis had a month-long trial with Toronto FC in July 2014, and was subsequently offered a place in the youth development programme.

=== Professional ===
Joining the Toronto FC Academy in January 2015, Davis featured for Toronto FC III fourteen times, scoring four times in the 2015 PDL season and appeared for Toronto FC II twice during the 2015 USL season. He made his debut for the reserve team on 28 March 2015 against FC Montreal, before making his first professional start on 19 April 2015 against Whitecaps FC 2.

The club announced that Davis had been rewarded with a USL contract in February 2016, which would see him remain with Toronto FC II for the 2016 season.

In September 2017, Davis signed with St. Andrews F.C. in Malta on an initial loan deal before signing for the club on a permanent basis in 2018. In November 2018, Davis won the BOV Player of the Month award after impressing in a 2–0 win over Balzan F.C.

In August 2019, Davis signed a 5-year contract with Gżira United F.C.

=== International ===
Davis has represented Jamaica at under-17 and under-20 levels. On 12 July 2012, he made his debut in a 5–0 win against Bermuda in the CONCACAF U-17 Championship. He made three further appearances for the U17s in a 1–1 draw against Panama, a 2–2 draw with Barbados and a 4–2 defeat to Canada. In January 2015, he made his debut in the CONCACAF U-20 Championship during a 2–2 draw with Trinidad & Tobago.

He is eligible to represent both Jamaica and Canada, due to his father being Canadian. As a result of holding a Canadian passport, Davis would classify as a domestic player for Toronto FC in both MLS and USL Pro.
