= Hugo Moutinho =

Portuguese footballer (born 1982)

Personal information
- Full name: Hugo Filipe dos Reis Moutinho
- Date of birth: 1 January 1982 (age 44)
- Place of birth: Lisbon, Portugal
- Height: 1.80 m (5 ft 11 in)
- Position: Attacking midfielder

Youth career
- 1993–1997: CAC Pontinha
- 1997–2000: Estrela Amadora
- 2000–2001: Sporting CP

Senior career*
Years	Team	Apps	(Gls)
2001–2007	Sporting CP B	36	(0)
2004–2006	→ Pampilhosa (loan)	51	(6)
2006–2007	→ Mafra (loan)	24	(3)
2007–2010	Drobeta	72	(12)
2010	→ FCM Turda (loan)	5	(0)
2010–2011	Oriental	22	(2)
2011–2013	Turnu Severin	39	(11)
2013	Politehnica Iași	13	(1)
2013	Aris Limassol	8	(1)
2014	AEK Kouklia	11	(0)
2014–2017	Pafos	70	(8)
2017–2019	Akritas Chlorakas	42	(5)
Total		393	(49)
- * Club domestic league appearances and goals

Hugo Filipe dos Reis Moutinho (born 1 January 1982) is a Portuguese former professional footballer who played as an attacking midfielder. He began his career at Sporting CP, but never played in the first team, going on to have a nomadic career spent mostly in Romania and Cyprus.

== Club career ==
A graduate of Sporting CP's youth academy, Lisbon-born Moutinho made his senior debut with their reserves, going on to compete in three third division seasons with the side. In 2004, he signed for Pampilhosa in the same league, receiving a five-match ban in November for assaulting the officiating squad and scoring his third and last goal of the campaign on 28 May 2005 in a 1–1 home draw against Fátima.

In summer 2007, after a spell with Mafra, Moutinho joined Drobeta in the Romanian Liga II. He became the first Portuguese player to score a hat-trick in the country in November the following year, against Mureșul Deva (3–2, away).

Moutinho remained in the nation until 2013, representing FCM Turda, Turnu Severin and Politehnica Iași. He made his top-flight debut on 20 July 2012 at the age of 30, playing the full 90 minutes in a 2–1 Liga I home loss to Dinamo București, and scored his team's goal in a 1–1 draw at Concordia Chiajna on 6 May 2013; this spell was interspersed with one year back in his homeland with third-tier Oriental, scoring against Mafra and Pinhalnovense.

In the 2013 off-season, Moutinho moved to Cyprus and signed with Aris Limassol. His contract was terminated in December of that year, and he joined AEK Kouklia also in the country and its First Division.

The following season, Moutinho signed for Cypriot Second Division club Pafos.

== Personal life ==
Moutinho's cousin, João, was also a footballer. A midfielder, he was a longtime Portugal international.

After retiring, Moutinho settled in Drobeta-Turnu Severin with his Romanian wife and worked as a youth coach.

== Career statistics ==
Appearances and goals by club, season and competition
Club	Season	League			Cup		Other		Total	
Club	Season	Division	Apps	Goals	Apps	Goals	Apps	Goals	Apps	Goals
Sporting CP B	2001–02	Segunda Divisão	11	0	—		—		11	0
Sporting CP B	2002–03	Segunda Divisão	24	0	—		—		24	0
Sporting CP B	2003–04	Segunda Divisão	1	0	—		—		1	0
Sporting CP B	Total		36	0	—		—		36	0
Pampilhosa (loan)	2004–05	Segunda Divisão	26	3	2	0	—		28	3
Pampilhosa (loan)	2005–06	Segunda Divisão	25	3	0	0	—		25	3
Pampilhosa (loan)	Total		51	6	2	0	—		53	6
Mafra (loan)	2006–07	Segunda Divisão	24	3	4	0	—		28	3
Drobeta	2007–08	Liga II	30	4			—		30	4
Drobeta	2008–09	Liga II	29	6			—		29	6
Drobeta	2009–10	Liga II	13	2			—		13	2
Drobeta	Total		72	12			—		72	12
FCM Turda (loan)	2009–10	Liga II	5	0			—		5	0
Oriental	2010–11	Segunda Divisão	22	2	2	0	—		24	2
Turnu Severin	2011–12	Liga II	21	10	2	0	—		23	10
Turnu Severin	2012–13	Liga I	18	1	2	0	—		20	1
Turnu Severin	Total		39	11	4	0	—		43	11
Politehnica Iași	2012–13	Liga I	13	1	0	0	—		13	1
Aris Limassol	2013–14	Cypriot First Division	8	1	0	0	—		8	1
AEK Kouklia	2013–14	Cypriot First Division	11	0	0	0	—		11	0
Pafos	2014–15	Cypriot Second Division	25	5			—		25	5
Pafos	2015–16	Cypriot First Division	20	0	1	0	—		21	0
Pafos	Total		45	5	1	0	—		46	5
Career total			326	41	13	0	0	0	339	41
