= Eduardo Pincelli =

Brazilian footballer (born 1983)

Eduardo
Personal information
- Full name: Eduardo Pincelli
- Date of birth: 23 April 1983 (age 43)
- Place of birth: São Paulo, Brazil
- Height: 1.83 m (6 ft 0 in)
- Position: Midfielder

Youth career
- 1999–2002: Fluminense

Senior career*
Years	Team	Apps	(Gls)
2002–2003	Fluminense	6	(0)
2003	Örebro	3	(0)
2004	Mirassol		
2004	Mogi Mirim		
2004	Atlético Bucaramanga		
2005	Sabah		
2005	Angra dos Reis		
2006–2007	Alghero		
2007–2008	Sanluri		
2008	Chalkanoras Idaliou	10	(2)
2009–2012	Ethnikos Achna	79	(6)
2012–2013	Nea Salamina	12	(0)
2013	Alki Larnaca	10	(2)
2013–2014	Duque de Caxias	6	(0)
2014	Aris Limassol	17	(3)
2014–2017	Ethnikos Achna	89	(21)
2018	Sligo Rovers	13	(1)
2018–2019	Ethnikos Achna	27	(17)
2019	Omonia Aradippou	2	(0)
2020	Karmiotissa	1	(0)
2020–2021	Ayia Napa		
2022–2023	Elpida Xylofagou		
- * Club domestic league appearances and goals as of 30 August 2020

Eduardo Pincelli (born 23 April 1983) is a Brazilian footballer who plays as a midfielder.

== Career ==
On 3 January 2020, it was confirmed that Pincelli had joined Karmiotissa FC.
