= Joël Damahou =

Ivorian footballer

Personal information
- Full name: Joël Eric Bailly Damahou
- Date of birth: 28 January 1987 (age 39)
- Place of birth: Koumassi, Ivory Coast
- Height: 1.90 m (6 ft 3 in)
- Position: Defensive midfielder

Youth career
- 1999–2002: Carrieres
- 2002–2003: Chatou
- 2003–2005: Paris

Senior career*
Years	Team	Apps	(Gls)
2005–2006	Paris		
2006–2008	Mantes		
2008–2010	Borussia Mönchengladbach II	45	(1)
2010–2011	Kickers Offenbach	9	(0)
2011–2012	Bnei Sakhnin	35	(2)
2012–2013	Maccabi Haifa	8	(0)
2013	Hapoel Ra'anana	0	(0)
2013–2014	Debrecen	1	(0)
2015	Tours	7	(0)
2015–2016	Pafos	34	(5)
2016–2017	Al-Arabi SC	16	(5)
2017	Trikala	6	(0)
2017–2018	Nea Salamina	30	(4)
2018–2019	Hapoel Acre	17	(0)
2019	Alashkert	12	(1)
2019–2020	Othellos Athienou		
2020–2021	Aris Limassol	0	(0)
- * Club domestic league appearances and goals

Joël Eric Bailly Damahou (born 28 January 1987) is an Ivorian former professional footballer who played as a defensive midfielder.

== Career ==
On 5 March 2019, Damahou signed with Armenian club Alashkert, being released by the club three months later on 5 June 2019.

He was appointed technical director at Cypriot club Aris Limassol in 2021.

== Career statistics ==
As of matches played as of 19 May 2017

Appearances and goals by club, season and competition
Club	Season	League		Cup		Other		Total	
Club	Season	Apps	Goals	Apps	Goals	Apps	Goals	Apps	Goals
Borussia Mönchengladbach II	2008–09	24	0	–		0	0	24	0
Borussia Mönchengladbach II	2009–10	21	1	–		0	0	21	1
Borussia Mönchengladbach II	Total	45	1	0	0	0	0	45	1
Kickers Offenbach	2010–11	15	0	1	0	0	0	16	0
Bnei Sakhnin	2011–12	35	2	0	0	0	0	35	2
Bnei Sakhnin	2012–13	2	0	3	0	0	0	5	0
Bnei Sakhnin	Total	37	2	3	0	0	0	40	2
Maccabi Haifa	2012–13	6	0	2	0	0	0	8	0
Debrecen	2013–14	0	0	3	0	2	0	5	0
Debrecen	2014–15	1	0	0	0	0	0	1	0
Debrecen	Total	1	0	3	0	2	0	6	0
Tours	2014–15	7	0	1	0	0	0	8	0
Pafos	2015–16	34	5	1	0	0	0	35	5
Career total		145	8	11	0	2	0	158	8
