= Ivan Forbes =

Portuguese footballer

Personal information
- Full name: Ivan Manuel Gomes Forbes
- Date of birth: 1 December 1986 (age 39)
- Place of birth: Portimão, Portugal
- Height: 1.80 m (5 ft 11 in)
- Position: Winger

Team information
- Current team: Città di Fasano

Senior career*
Years	Team	Apps	(Gls)
2006–2007	Kingsbury London Tigers		
2007–2009	Dorchester Town	39	(4)
2010	Havant & Waterlooville		
2010–2011	Kingsbury London Tigers		
2011–2012	Akritas Chlorakas	22	(3)
2012–2014	AEK Kouklia	38	(2)
2014–2016	Pafos FC	35	(0)
2016–2017	Monopoli	7	(0)
2017	Madre Pietra Daunia	?	(?)
2017–	Ostuni Sport	?	(?)
- * Club domestic league appearances and goals as of 9 March 2017 (UTC)

Ivan Manuel Gomes Forbes (born 1 December 1986 in Portimão), is a Portuguese footballer who plays for Ostuni Sport, as a winger.
