= Nassir Maachi =

Dutch footballer (born 1985)

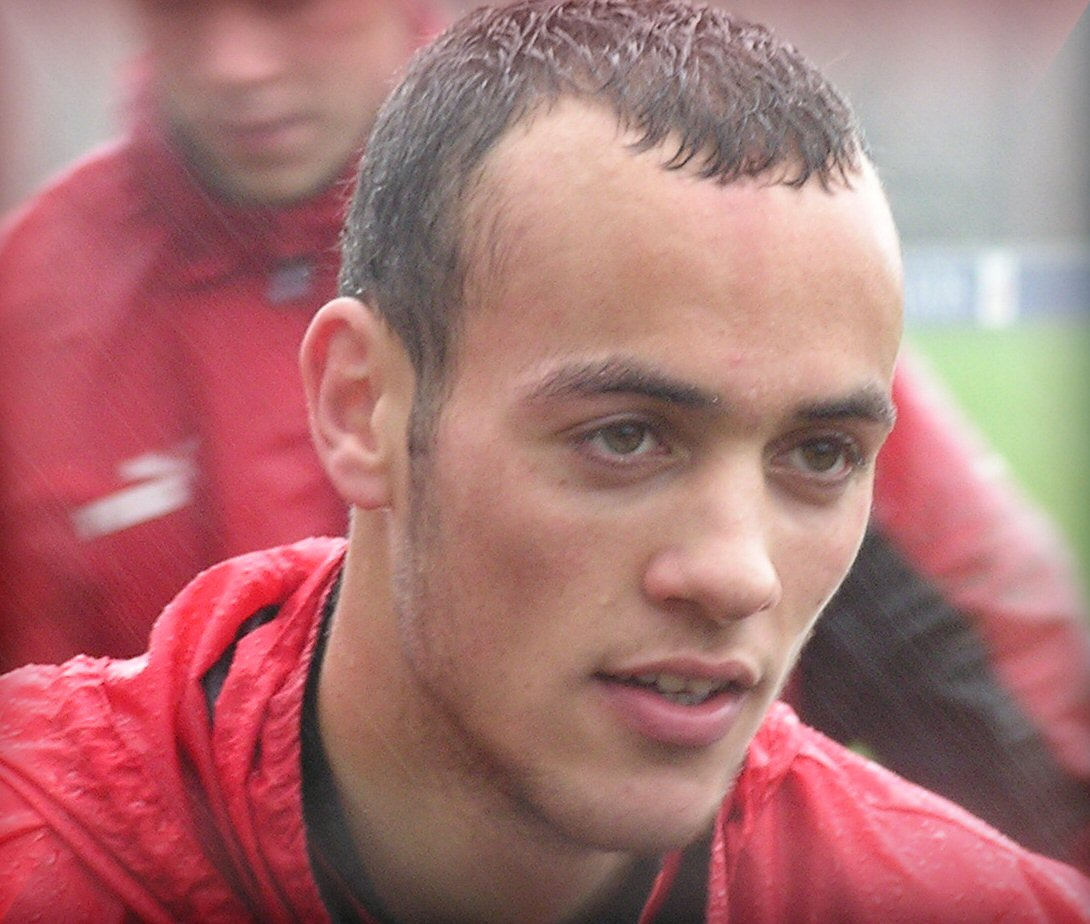

Personal information
- Full name: Nassir Ahmed Maachi
- Date of birth: 9 September 1985 (age 41)
- Place of birth: Naarden, Netherlands
- Height: 1.85 m (6 ft 1 in)
- Position: Winger

Youth career
- SV Huizen
- HSV De Zuidvogels
- 2000–2005: Utrecht

Senior career*
Years	Team	Apps	(Gls)
2005–2007	Utrecht	12	(3)
2007–2008	Dordrecht	38	(11)
2008–2011	Cambuur	88	(27)
2011–2012	Zwolle	40	(18)
2012–2014	AEK Larnaca	41	(13)
2014	Flamurtari		
2015	Birkirkara	9	(3)
2015–2016	Pafos	31	(11)
2016–2017	Nea Salamina	35	(11)
2017–2018	Apollon Smyrnis	10	(0)
2018	Alki Oroklini	10	(0)
2018	DOVO	11	(2)
2019	ASIL	13	(1)
2019–2021	SV Huizen		
2021–?	De Posthoorn		
- * Club domestic league appearances and goals

Nassir Maachi (born 9 September 1985) is a Dutch former professional footballer who played as a winger.

== Career ==
Maachi began his career as a youth player at Utrecht. He made his first team debut during the 2005–06 season and spent the following year on loan with Dordrecht. He joined Cambuur in 2008 and spent three seasons with the club before being transferred to Zwolle, initially on loan and then permanently during the summer of 2011. In summer 2012, Maachi joined technical director Kevin Hofland at Cypriot side AEK Larnaca. After an unsuccessful stint in Albania, Maachi moved to Birkirkara in January 2015. In the next two years he played in Cyprus for Pafos FC and Nea Salamina. On 18 June 2016, the newly promoted to Super League Greece club Apollon Smyrnis officially announced the signing of the experienced Dutch-Moroccan forward on a free transfer. At the end of August 2018, Maachi joined VV DOVO which competes in the Derde Divisie. At the end of 2018 he left there again to return to Cyprus.

At the end of November 2019, Maachi returned to his former youth club, SV Huizen, where he also would work as a youth coach. He began playing for De Posthoorn in 2021.
