= Emmanuel Okoye =

Nigerian footballer

Personal information
- Full name: Emmanuel Ndubuisi Okoye
- Date of birth: 4 April 1991 (age 35)
- Place of birth: Lagos, Nigeria
- Height: 1.81 m (5 ft 11 in)
- Position: Winger

Senior career*
Years	Team	Apps	(Gls)
2008–2011	Vyzas	77	(19)
2011–2014	Panionios	20	(4)
2014–2015	Aris Limassol	31	(3)
2015–2016	Pafos FC	32	(5)
2016–2017	Marbella	21	(3)
2017–2018	Gżira United	24	(10)
2018–2019	Akritas Chlorakas	11	(2)
2019	Al-Arabi		
- * Club domestic league appearances and goals as of 19 July 2018

Emmanuel Ndubuisi Okoye (born 4 April 1991) is a Nigerian footballer who plays as a winger.

== Club career ==
Okoye started his career from Greek side Vyzas – in three years, he made a total of 77 league appearances and scored 19 goals for the club, all in the Football League 2. In July 2011, he moved to Panionios in the Super League.
