= Levan Khmaladze =

Georgian footballer

Levan Khmaladze ლევან ხმალაძე
Personal information
- Date of birth: 6 April 1985 (age 41)
- Place of birth: Tbilisi, Georgia
- Height: 1.82 m (5 ft 11 1/2 in)
- Position: Midfielder

Team information
- Current team: Samtredia
- Number: 18

Senior career*
Years	Team	Apps	(Gls)
2001–2003	Dinamo-3 Tbilisi	32	(3)
2001–2002	→ Norchi Dinamoeli Tbilisi (loan)	10	(1)
2003–2006	Dinamo-2 Tbilisi	26	(7)
2004–2010	Dinamo Tbilisi	95	(7)
2004	→ Dinamo Batumi (loan)	14	(0)
2005–2006	→ Sioni Bolnisi (loan)	28	(2)
2010	Hapoel Haifa	2	(0)
2010–2013	Dinamo Tbilisi	95	(19)
2014	Chikhura Sachkhere	13	(0)
2014–2015	Othellos Athienou	23	(3)
2015–2017	Pafos	57	(5)
2017–2018	THOI Lakatamia	5	(0)
2018–2019	Sioni Bolnisi	59	(5)
2020–2021	Shukura Kobuleti	43	(2)
2022–	Samtredia	69	(3)

International career
2003	Georgia U-19	1	(0)
2008–2014	Georgia	12	(0)
- * Club domestic league appearances and goals as of 11 December 2024

Levan Khmaladze (Georgian: ლევან ხმალაძე; born 6 April 1985) is a Georgian football midfielder currently playing for Samtredia.

== Club career ==
He previously played for Chikhura Sachkhere in Georgia. A member of the Georgian national team, he signed for Hapoel Haifa on 18 January 2010.

== Honours ==
- Georgian League: 2
  - 2008, 2013
- Georgian Cup: 2
  - 2009, 2013
- Georgian Super Cup: 1
  - 2008
