= Hervé Bodiong =

Cameroonian footballer

Personal information
- Full name: Hervé William Bodiong Andiolo
- Date of birth: 17 June 1997 (age 29)
- Place of birth: Yaoundé, Cameroon
- Height: 1.89 m (6 ft 2 1/2 in)
- Position: Midfielder

Team information
- Current team: Nea Salamina
- Number: 31

Youth career
- TAD Sport Academy

Senior career*
Years	Team	Apps	(Gls)
2015–2016	Tours		
2015–2016	→ AEP Paphos (loan)	4	(1)
2016–2017	Akritas Chlorakas	19	(2)
2017–2018	PAEEK	22	(3)
2018–2019	ASIL	24	(0)
2019–2020	PO Xylotymbou	19	(6)
2020–	Nea Salamina	9	(0)

International career^{‡}
2016–2017	Cameroon U20	2	(0)
- * Club domestic league appearances and goals as of 9 June 2021 ‡ National team caps and goals as of March 2017

Hervé William Bodiong Andiolo (born 17 June 1997) is a Cameroonian professional footballer who plays as a midfielder for Nea Salamina.

== Career ==
He began his career at TAD Sport Academy in Yaoundé.

Bodiong joined PO Xylotymbou in Cyprus ahead of the 2019–20 season.
