= Carlos Marques =

Portuguese footballer

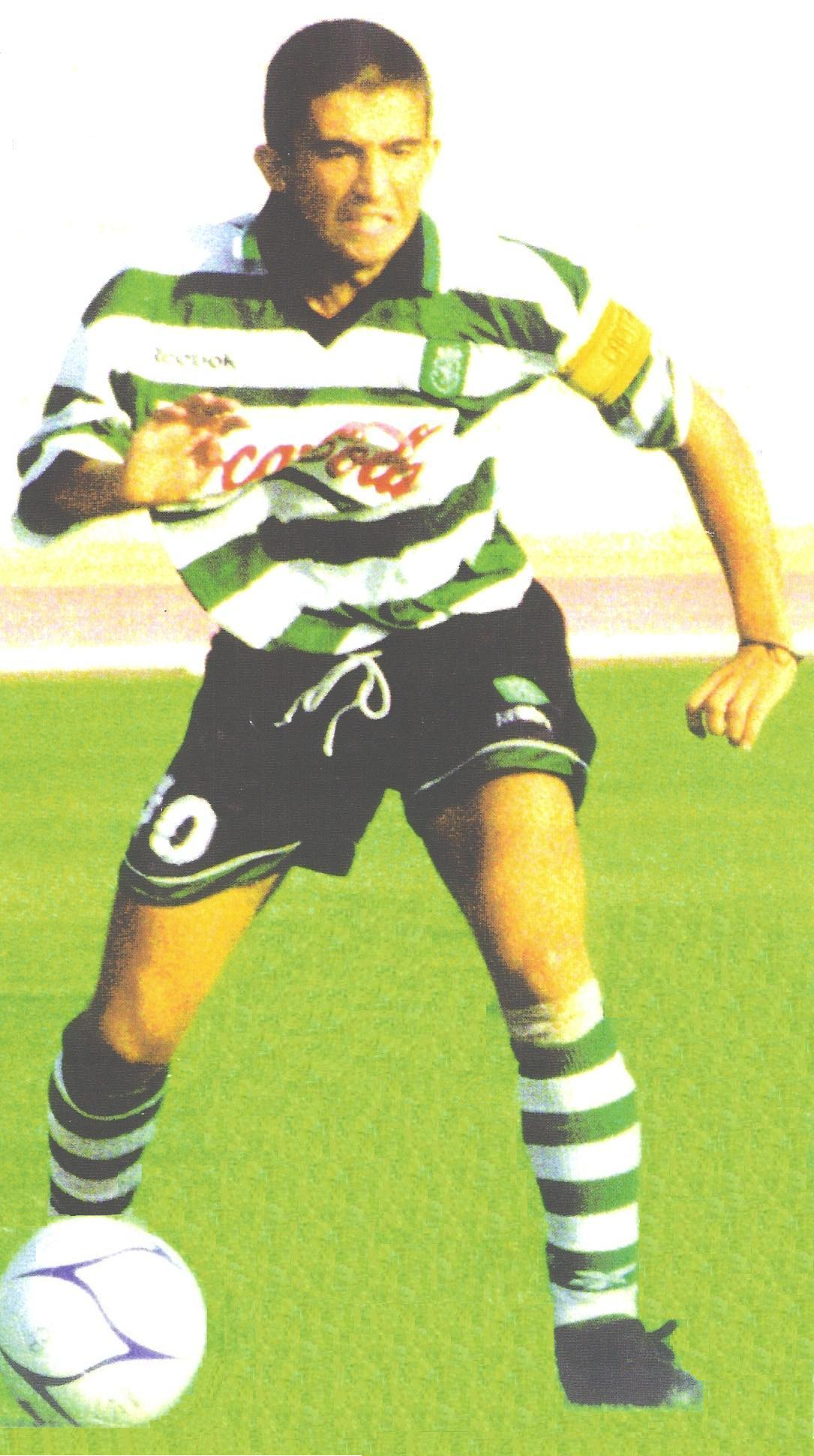
- Marques playing for Sporting

Personal information
- Full name: Carlos Manuel Oliveira Marques
- Date of birth: 6 February 1983 (age 43)
- Place of birth: Lisbon, Portugal
- Height: 1.76 m (5 ft 9 1/2 in)
- Position: Defender

Youth career
- 1992–2002: Sporting CP

Senior career*
Years	Team	Apps	(Gls)
2001–2006	Sporting B	72	(1)
2004–2005	→ Ovarense (loan)	25	(0)
2005–2006	→ União Madeira (loan)	22	(0)
2006	Ethnikos	6	(0)
2007	Olivais Moscavide	11	(2)
2007–2011	APOP	65	(0)
2011	AEL Limassol	9	(0)
2011	Alki Larnaca	3	(0)
2012	Olympiakos Nicosia	11	(0)
2012–2015	Doxa	57	(0)
2015–2016	Pafos	14	(0)
2016–2017	Doxa	1	(0)
2017–2018	Digenis Akritas	23	(1)
Total		319	(4)

International career
2000	Portugal U16	11	(1)
2001	Portugal U17	7	(0)
2001–2002	Portugal U19	14	(0)
2003–2004	Portugal U20	4	(0)
2004	Portugal U21	1	(0)
- * Club domestic league appearances and goals

Carlos Manuel Oliveira Marques (born 6 February 1983) is a Portuguese former professional footballer who played as a right back or a central defender.

He spent most of his career in Cyprus, arriving in the country in 2007.

== Club career ==
Born in Lisbon, Marques joined local Sporting CP's youth academy at the age of 9. He could never appear for his hometown club's first team, only competing with the reserve side in the third division and being loaned twice.

In 2006, released by the Lions, Marques signed with Ethnikos Piraeus F.C. of the Greek second level. Unsettled, he returned to his country in the following transfer window, joining C.D. Olivais e Moscavide in the second tier, being regularly used during his four-month spell but suffering relegation.

Marques moved to APOP Kinyras FC during the summer of 2007. In November of the following year, he tested positive in a doping test alongside compatriot Lionel Medeiros, following a match against Anorthosis Famagusta FC played on 31 October. The Cyprus Football Association's judiciary committee imposed a one-year ban on the former starting from the day he sampled, but eventually took into consideration his cooperation as he showed coach Eduard Eranosyan to be solely responsible for the result; the club decided to keep him and, in May, he helped it win the season's Cypriot Cup.

In early February 2011, Marques changed teams but stayed in the Cypriot First Division, signing for AEL Limassol.

== International career ==
All youth levels comprised, Marques won 43 caps for Portugal and scored once. His only appearance for the under-21s occurred on 17 August 2004, when he played the second half of the 0–0 friendly draw to Malta held in Pedroso, Vila Nova de Gaia.

== Club statistics ==
As of 24 September 2015

Club	Season	League			Cup		Continental		Total	
Club	Season	Division	Apps	Goals	Apps	Goals	Apps	Goals	Apps	Goals
Sporting B	2001–02	Portuguese Second Division	6	0	—				6	0
Sporting B	2002–03	Portuguese Second Division	30	0	—				30	0
Sporting B	2003–04	Portuguese Second Division	36	1	—				36	1
Sporting B	Total		72	1	—				72	1
Ovarense (loan)	2004–05	Segunda Liga	25	0	1	0	—		26	0
União Madeira (loan)	2005–06	Portuguese Second Division	22	0	0	0	—		22	0
Olivais Moscavide	2006–07	Segunda Liga	11	2	0	0	—		11	2
Ethnikos	2006–07	Football League	6	0			—		6	0
APOP	2007–08	Cypriot First Division	25	0			—		25	0
APOP	2008–09	Cypriot First Division	9	0			—		9	0
APOP	2009–10	Cypriot First Division	17	0			—		17	0
APOP	2010–11	Cypriot First Division	14	0			—		14	0
APOP	Total		65	0			—		65	0
AEL Limassol	2010–11	Cypriot First Division	9	0	0	0	—		9	0
Alki Larnaca	2011–12	Cypriot First Division	3	0	0	0	—		3	0
Olympiakos Nicosia	2011–12	Cypriot First Division	11	0	2	0	—		13	0
Doxa	2012–13	Cypriot First Division	15	0	0	0	—		15	0
Doxa	2013–14	Cypriot First Division	21	0	5	0	—		26	0
Doxa	2014–15	Cypriot First Division	21	0	2	0	—		23	0
Doxa	Total		57	0	7	0	—		64	0
Pafos	2015–16	Cypriot First Division	2	0	0	0	—		2	0
Career total			283	3	10	0	0	0	293	3
