= Éric Matoukou =

Cameroonian footballer

Eric Matoukou
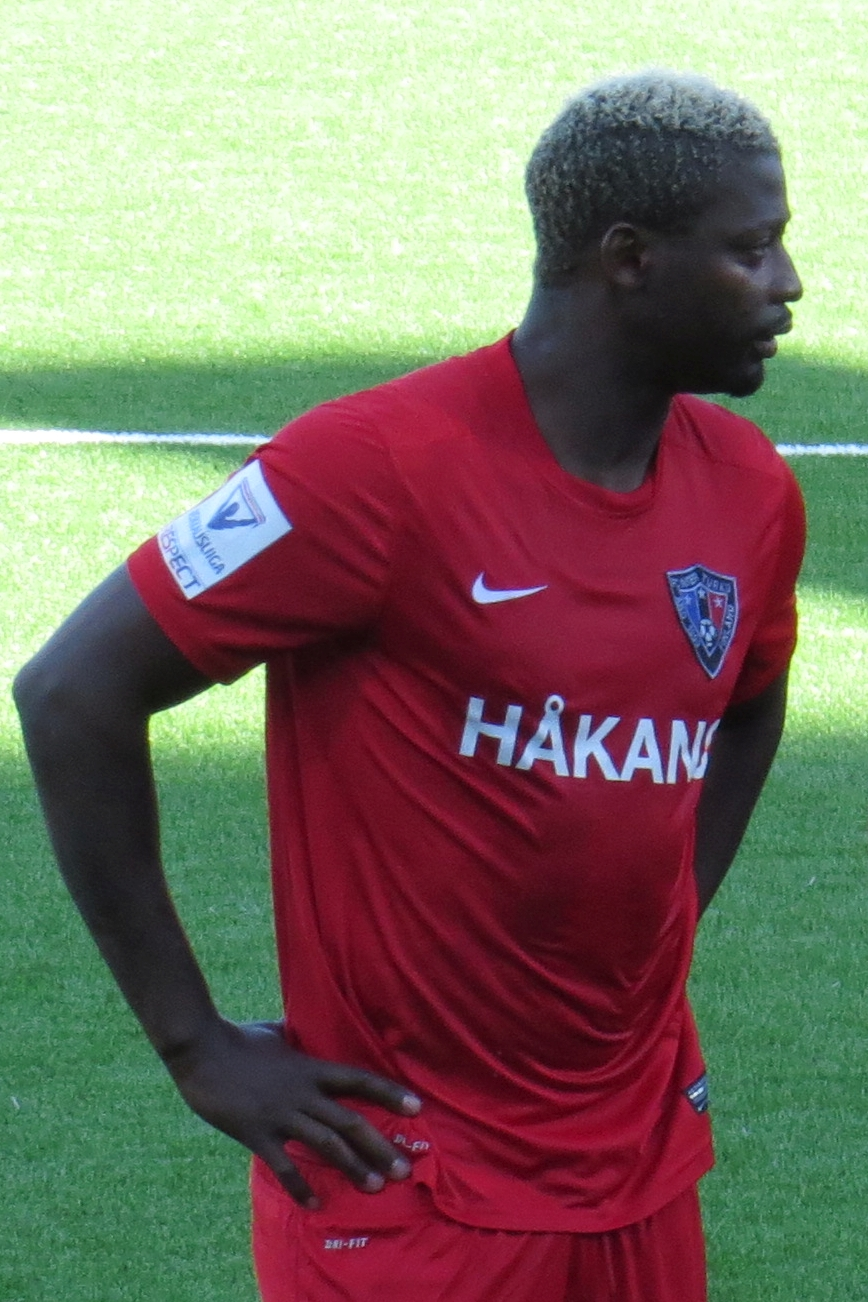

Personal information
- Full name: Eric Matoukou
- Date of birth: July 8, 1983 (age 43)
- Place of birth: Yaoundé, Cameroon
- Height: 1.87 m (6 ft 1 1/2 in)
- Position: Defender

Team information
- Current team: Sprimont Comblain
- Number: 23

Senior career*
Years	Team	Apps	(Gls)
2001–2002	Pyramide F.C.	8	(0)
2002	R.W.D. Molenbeek	10	(0)
2002–2003	KSK Heusden-Zolder	33	(2)
2004–2011	K.R.C. Genk	183	(8)
2011–2014	Dnipro Dnipropetrovsk	0	(0)
2011–2012	→ Arsenal Kyiv (loan)	15	(0)
2013–2014	→ Volyn Lutsk (loan)	6	(0)
2014–2015	Lierse	6	(1)
2015–2016	Inter Turku	25	(0)
2016	Pafos	13	(1)
2017–	Sprimont Comblain	3	(0)

International career^{‡}
2005–2007	Cameroon	6	(0)
- * Club domestic league appearances and goals ‡ National team caps and goals as of 27 February 2017 (UTC)

Eric Matoukou (born 8 July 1983 in Yaoundé) is a Cameroonian football defender. He currently plays for Sprimont Comblain.

Matoukou won the Jupiler Pro League and the Belgian Cup during his career. He has played in the highest football league in Cameroon, Belgium, Ukraine, Finland and for the Cameroonian national team.

== International ==
He made his international debut on 9 February 2005, against Senegal, friendly match played in France.

== Honours ==
Genk

- Belgian Cup: 2008–09
- Belgian Pro League: 2010–11
