= Elgujja Grigalashvili =

Georgian footballer

Elguja Grigalashvili
Personal information
- Full name: Elguja Grigalashvili
- Date of birth: 30 December 1989 (age 36)
- Place of birth: Tbilisi, Soviet Union (now Georgia)
- Height: 5 ft 9 in (1.75 m)
- Position: Midfielder

Team information
- Current team: Navbahor

Youth career
- Dinamo Batumi

Senior career*
Years	Team	Apps	(Gls)
2009–2012	Dinamo Batumi	52	(18)
2011–2012	→ Merani Martvili (loan)	33	(6)
2012–2013	Torpedo Kutaisi	29	(6)
2013–2014	Dinamo Tbilisi	14	(2)
2013–2014	→ Chikhura Sachkhere (loan)	7	(0)
2014–2015	Othellos Athienou	26	(3)
2015	Pafos	13	(2)
2016	Ethnikos Achna	12	(0)
2016–2017	Othellos Athienou	?	(?)
2017–2018	Dinamo Batumi	18	(5)
2018–2019	Qizilqum Zarafshon	40	(12)
2019–2020	AGMK	34	(14)
2021	Qizilqum Zarafshon	23	(9)
2022–	Navbahor		

International career
2013–	Georgia	4	(0)
- * Club domestic league appearances and goals as of 22:22, 28 November 2021 (UTC)

Elguja Grigalashvili (Georgian: ელგუჯა გრიგალაშვილი; born 30 December 1989), is a Georgian footballer, who plays as a playmaking midfielder for Navbahor.

Born in the Georgian capital Tbilisi, his first professional club was FC Dinamo Batumi. He first came to international prominence with his performances for the Georgian national team against Kazakhstan in 2013.

He is the younger brother of Shota, also footballer.

== Style of play ==
Elguja Grigalashvili's position is as a playmaking midfielder, typically playing further forward than the rest of the midfield. The main aim of the role is to create goalscoring chances, suiting a creative player like Elguja Grigalashvili. Dribbling ability was generally viewed as one of Elguja's strongest attributes and his jinking runs with the ball resulted in some spectacular goals. Set piece ability is another of Elguja's strengths; he regularly takes corners and free kicks.

== Honours ==
=== Club ===
AGMK

- Uzbekistan Cup (1): 2019 (runner-up)
- Uzbekistan League Cup (1): 2019 (runner-up)

Chikhura

- Georgian Cup (1): 2013–2014 (runner-up)
- Georgian Super Cup (1): 2013–2014 (runner-up)
