= Bojan Kaljević =

Montenegrin footballer (born 1986)

Personal information
- Date of birth: January 25, 1986 (age 40)
- Place of birth: Montenegro
- Position: Striker

Team information
- Current team: Tarxien Rainbows

Senior career*
Years	Team	Apps	(Gls)
2008–2020	Metallurg		
2010–2012	Bunyodkor		
2012–2013	Titograd	8	(0)
2013–2014	Mosta	39	(19)
2015–2018	Balzan	74	(51)
2019–2020	Valletta	34	(13)
2020–2021	Mosta	20	(14)
2021–2023	Balzan	53	(13)
2023–	Tarxien Rainbows		
- * Club domestic league appearances and goals

Bojan Kaljević (born 25 January 1986) is a Montenegrin footballer who plays as a striker for Tarxien Rainbows.

== Early life ==
Kaljević was born 25 January 1986. He has four siblings. He started playing football at the age of nine.

== Career ==
He played for Uzbekistani side Bunyodkor, helping the club win the league. After that, he played in Malta, where he was described as "the top scorer in the league, the best player, one of the best foreigners of all time, and now he can say that he achieved almost everything in Malta".
