= Marco Sahanek =

Austrian footballer

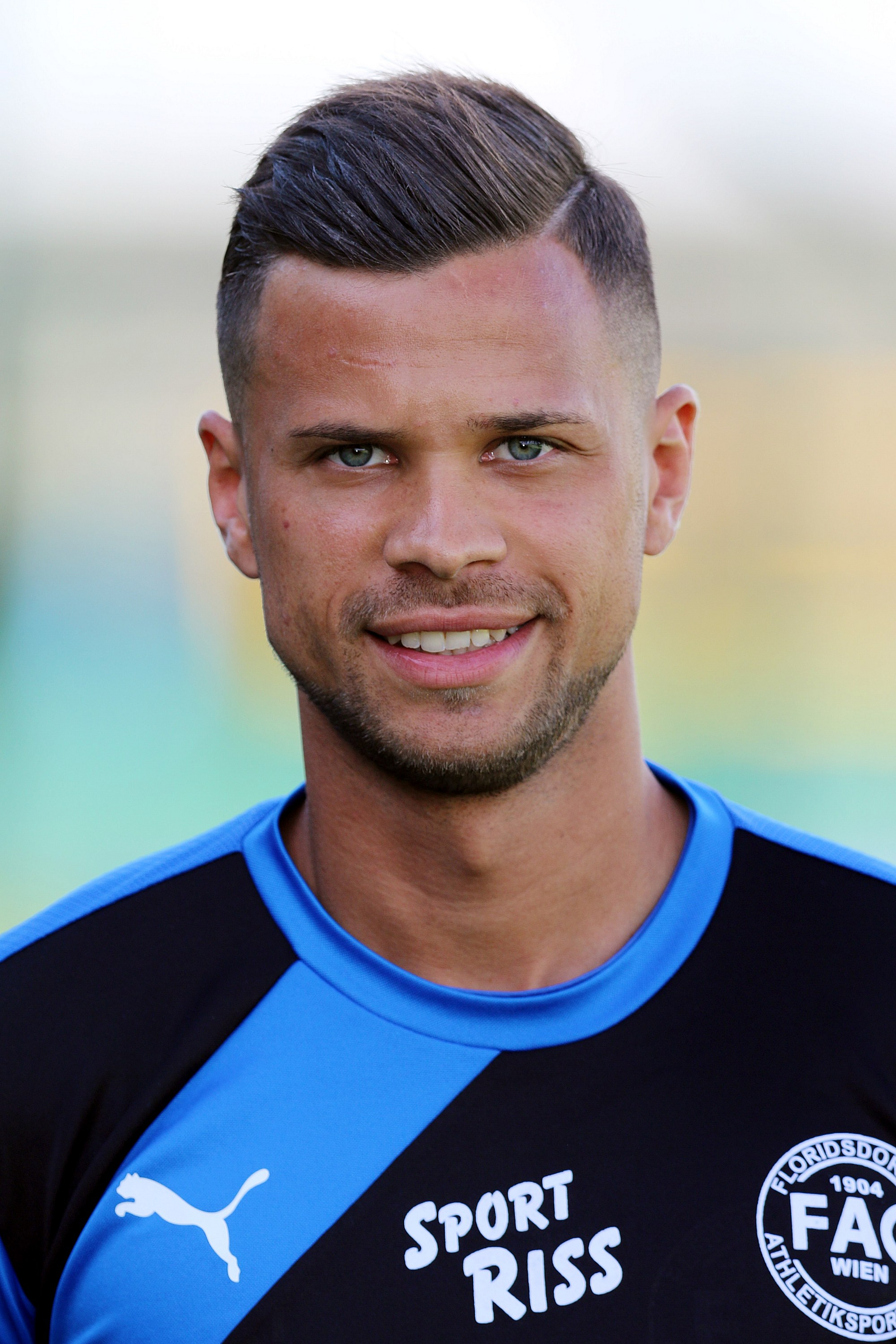
- Sahanek with Floridsdorfer AC in 2016

Personal information
- Date of birth: 27 January 1990 (age 36)
- Place of birth: Vienna, Austria
- Height: 1.82 m (5 ft 11 1/2 in)
- Position: Attacking midfielder

Youth career
- 1996–2005: Austria Wien
- 2005: FC Stadlau
- 2005–2007: Admira Wacker Mödling

Senior career*
Years	Team	Apps	(Gls)
2007–2008	ASK Schwadorf	9	(2)
2008–2010	Admira Wacker	52	(12)
2010–2011	Wolfsberger AC	23	(3)
2011–2012	SV Kapfenberg	11	(0)
2012–2013	Austria Klagenfurt	13	(3)
2013–2014	SV Horn	48	(11)
2014–2015	FC Wacker Innsbruck	6	(1)
2015	SV Horn	15	(4)
2015–2016	Austria Klagenfurt	18	(1)
2016–2017	Floridsdorfer AC	33	(9)
2017	Hibernians	14	(2)
2018–2021	Floridsdorfer AC	48	(14)
2018–2019	→ Admira Wacker (loan)	11	(1)
2019	→ Hibernians (loan)	13	(2)
2021	Nakhon Ratchasima	11	(2)
2022	NorthEast United	7	(1)
- * Club domestic league appearances and goals as of 19:22, 28 February 2022 (UTC)

Marco Sahanek (born 27 January 1990), is an Austrian professional footballer who last played as an attacking midfielder for Indian Super League club NorthEast United.

== Club career ==
On 21 January 2022, Sahanek joined Indian Super League club NorthEast United till the end of 2021–22 Indian Super League season. He made his debut against Chennaiyin on 22 January, which ended in a 2–1 loss as a substitute for Sehnaj Singh in the 64th minute of the game. He scored a goal against East Bengal in 28 February, Which ended in a 1–1 draw.
