= Miguel Alba =

Argentine footballer

Personal information
- Full name: Miguel Ángel Alba
- Date of birth: 14 August 1988 (age 38)
- Place of birth: Mar del Plata, Argentina
- Height: 1.78 m (5 ft 10 in)
- Position: Forward

Team information
- Current team: St Lucia
- Number: 27

Youth career
- –2008: CA Union

Senior career*
Years	Team	Apps	(Gls)
2009–2012	CA Union	58	(12)
2010–2011	→ Chacarita Juniors (loan)	31	(4)
2012–2013	Douglas Haig	32	(8)
2013	Alianza Petrolera	12	(1)
2013–2014	Ñublense	10	(1)
2014	Santamarina	14	(0)
2015–2016	Guaraní	27	(5)
2016	Pafos	14	(3)
2016	Veria	0	(0)
2016–2017	Ermis Aradippou	12	(3)
2017	Birkirkara	12	(6)
2017	Gimnasia y Tiro	2	(0)
2018–2019	Valletta	36	(12)
2019	Birkirkara	8	(4)
2020–2021	Valletta	13	(3)
2021	GSD Di Benedetto Trinitapoli	?	(?)
2021-2022	US Agropoli 1921	?	(?)
2022–	St Lucia	21	(0)
- * Club domestic league appearances and goals as of 25 June 2023

Miguel Ángel Alba (born 14 August 1988 in Mar del Plata, Buenos Aires) is an Argentine footballer who plays as a forward for St Lucia in the Maltese Premier League.
