= List of Maltese football transfers summer 2010 =

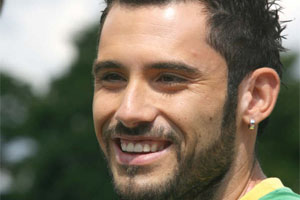
Etienne Barbara swapped Hibernians for American side Carolina RailHawks.

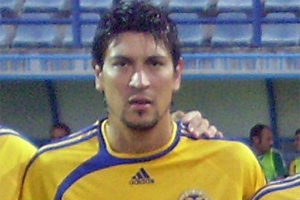
Julio Alcorsé returned to Marsaxlokk following his release from Sliema Wanderers.

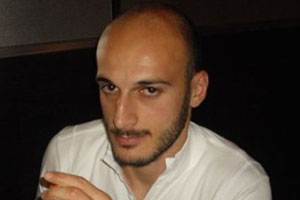
Ian Azzopardi joined Valletta from Sliema Wanderers.

This is a list of Maltese football transfers for the 2010–11 summer transfer window by club. Only transfers of clubs in the Maltese Premier League and Maltese First Division are included.

The summer transfer window opened on 1 July 2010, although a few transfers may take place prior to that date. The window closed at midnight on 31 August 2010. Players without a club may join one at any time, either during or in between transfer windows.

== Maltese Premier League ==
=== Birkirkara ===
In: Note: Flags indicate national team as defined under FIFA eligibility rules; some limited exceptions apply. Players may hold more than one non-FIFA nationality.

No.	Pos.	Nation	Player
26	GK	(Malta) MLT	Manuel Bartolo (on loan from Msida Saint-Joseph)
29	GK	(Scotland) SCO	Michael Fraser (from (Scotland) Motherwell)
1	GK	(Brazil) BRA	Ezequiel Lovizon (from Unknown)
—	GK	(Malta) MLT	Bernard Paris (loan return from Floriana)
5	DF	(Malta) MLT	Patrick Borg (loan return from Mqabba)
27	DF	(Scotland) SCO	Ryan Harding (from (Scotland) East Stirlingshire)
—	DF	(Malta) MLT	Clint Zammit (loan return from Għargħur)
—	MF	(Malta) MLT	Martin Anastasi (loan return from Mqabba)
—	MF	(Malta) MLT	Iro Curmi (loan return from Msida Saint-Joseph)
28	MF	(Malta) MLT	Andrew Decesare (from Tarxien Rainbows)
—	MF	(Malta) MLT	Luke Stivala (loan return from Mosta)
23	FW	(Argentina) ARG	Emiliano Lattes (from Sliema Wanderers)
17	FW	(Malta) MLT	Terence Vella (on loan from Gudja United)

Out: Note: Flags indicate national team as defined under FIFA eligibility rules; some limited exceptions apply. Players may hold more than one non-FIFA nationality.

No.	Pos.	Nation	Player
22	GK	(Malta) MLT	Omar Borg (on loan to Ħamrun Spartans)
3	DF	(Malta) MLT	Carlo Mamo (loan return to Marsaxlokk)
21	MF	(Malta) MLT	George Mallia (to Qormi)
—	MF	(Malta) MLT	Luke Stivala (on loan to St. George's)
17	FW	(Netherlands) NED	Sylvano Comvalius (released)

=== Floriana ===
In: Note: Flags indicate national team as defined under FIFA eligibility rules; some limited exceptions apply. Players may hold more than one non-FIFA nationality.

No.	Pos.	Nation	Player
—	GK	(Malta) MLT	Simon Agius (loan return from Sliema Wanderers)
—	GK	(Tunisia) TUN	Lotfi Saïdi (from (Tunisia) AS Kasserine)
—	DF	(Malta) MLT	Tyrone Farrugia (from Msida Saint-Joseph)
—	DF	(Malta) MLT	Duncan Pisani (loan return from Qormi)
—	DF	(Bulgaria) BUL	Ivailo Sokolov (from (Bulgaria) PFC Marek Dupnitsa)
—	MF	(Malta) MLT	Mauro Brincat (loan return from Vittoriosa Stars)
—	MF	(Malta) MLT	Christian Cassar (on loan from Marsaxlokk)
—	MF	(Bulgaria) BUL	Kiril Djorov (from (Bulgaria) PFC Lokomotiv Mezdra)
—	MF	(Malta) MLT	Mark Gauci (loan return from Mqabba)
20	FW	(Ethiopia) ETH	Michael Ghebru (from (United States) Real Maryland Monarchs)
—	FW	(United States) USA	Michael Mecerod (from (United States) SSC Honduras)
—	FW	(Malta) MLT	Manolito Micallef (on loan from Ħamrun Spartans)
—	FW	(Malta) MLT	Ivan Woods (from Sliema Wanderers)

Out: Note: Flags indicate national team as defined under FIFA eligibility rules; some limited exceptions apply. Players may hold more than one non-FIFA nationality.

No.	Pos.	Nation	Player
—	GK	(Malta) MLT	Simon Agius (on loan to Vittoriosa Stars)
1	GK	(Malta) MLT	Bernard Paris (loan return to Birkirkara)
13	DF	(Malta) MLT	Orosco Anonam (to Tarxien Rainbows)
4	DF	(Malta) MLT	Julian Briffa (to Sliema Wanderers)
3	DF	(Malta) MLT	Clifton Ciantar (to Balzan Youths)
5	DF	(Nigeria) NGA	Sunday Eboh (to Marsaxlokk)
—	DF	(Malta) MLT	Stefano Grima (released)
7	MF	(Malta) MLT	Marlon Briffa (loan return to Mqabba)
—	MF	(Malta) MLT	Mauro Brincat (on loan to Vittoriosa Stars)
8	MF	(Malta) MLT	Christian Cassar (loan return to Marsaxlokk)
—	MF	(Malta) MLT	Mauro Grioli (on loan to Mqabba)
22	MF	(Serbia) SRB	Stefan Lijeskic (released)
—	FW	(Malta) MLT	Roberto Brincat (on loan to Gzira United)
20	FW	(Ethiopia) ETH	Michael Ghebru (released)
9	FW	(Russia) RUS	Victor Zlydarev (released)

=== Ħamrun Spartans ===
In: Note: Flags indicate national team as defined under FIFA eligibility rules; some limited exceptions apply. Players may hold more than one non-FIFA nationality.

No.	Pos.	Nation	Player
—	GK	(Malta) MLT	Omar Borg (on loan from Birkirkara)
—	DF	(Malta) MLT	Daniel Bonnici (loan return from Gudja United)
—	DF	(Malta) MLT	John Debattista (loan return from Mqabba)
—	DF	(Serbia) SRB	Jovan Vukanic (from Unknown)
—	MF	(Malta) MLT	Kevin Borg (loan return from Dingli Swallows)
—	MF	(Malta) MLT	David Camilleri (on loan from Valletta)
—	MF	(Malta) MLT	Ryan Fenech (loan return from Sliema Wanderers)
—	MF	(Malta) MLT	Massimo Grima (on loan to Valletta)
—	FW	(Malta) MLT	Steven Meilak (loan return from Qormi)
28	FW	(Nigeria) NGA	Obinne Obifuele (from (Nigeria) Eleven Planners)
—	FW	(Scotland) SCO	Dene Shields (from (Scotland) Raith Rovers)

Out: Note: Flags indicate national team as defined under FIFA eligibility rules; some limited exceptions apply. Players may hold more than one non-FIFA nationality.

No.	Pos.	Nation	Player
—	DF	(Malta) MLT	Daniel Bonnici (on loan to Gudja United)
3	DF	(Malta) MLT	Dalton Caruana (on loan to Lija Athletic)
—	DF	(Malta) MLT	John Debattista (on loan to Mqabba)
24	DF	(Malta) MLT	Timothy Fleri Soler (loan return to Hibernians)
15	MF	(Malta) MLT	Mark Barbara (loan return to Valletta)
28	FW	(Angola) ANG	João Mawete (released)
—	FW	(Malta) MLT	Steven Meilak (on loan to Balzan Youths)
9	FW	(Malta) MLT	Manolito Micallef (on loan to Floriana)
28	FW	(Nigeria) NGA	Obinne Obifuele (to Sliema Wanderers)
90	FW	(Malta) MLT	Ian Zammit (loan return to Valletta)

=== Hibernians ===
In: Note: Flags indicate national team as defined under FIFA eligibility rules; some limited exceptions apply. Players may hold more than one non-FIFA nationality.

No.	Pos.	Nation	Player
—	GK	(Malta) MLT	David Cassar (loan return from Tarxien Rainbows)
—	DF	(England) ENG	Matthew Clarke (from (England) Bradford City)
—	DF	(Malta) MLT	Timothy Fleri Soler (loan return from Ħamrun Spartans)
—	DF	(Malta) MLT	Jonathan Xerri (loan return from Vittoriosa Stars)
16	MF	(Malta) MLT	Matthew Gauci (loan return from (England) Lowestoft Town)
—	MF	(Australia) AUS	Leighton Grech (loan return from Marsaxlokk)
—	MF	(Scotland) SCO	Richard Hart (from (Scotland) Dundee)
—	MF	(Malta) MLT	Gary Inguanez (loan return from Vittoriosa Stars)
21	MF	(Serbia) SRB	Zoran Levnaić (from Msida Saint-Joseph)
—	MF	(Malta) MLT	Clayton Micallef (loan return from Vittoriosa Stars)
9	FW	(Malta) MLT	Warren Chircop (on loan from Tarxien Rainbows)
30	FW	(Nigeria) NGA	Ndubisi Chukunyere (from Free Agent)
—	FW	(Scotland) SCO	Paul McManus (from (Scotland) East Fife)
7	FW	(Malta) MLT	Steve Pisani (on loan from San Gwann)

Out: Note: Flags indicate national team as defined under FIFA eligibility rules; some limited exceptions apply. Players may hold more than one non-FIFA nationality.

No.	Pos.	Nation	Player
—	GK	(Malta) MLT	David Cassar (on loan to Tarxien Rainbows)
—	GK	(Malta) MLT	Thomas Galea (on loan to St. George's)
2	DF	(Malta) MLT	Jonathan Caruana (to Valletta)
—	DF	(Malta) MLT	Benoir Fenech (on loan to St. George's)
—	DF	(Malta) MLT	Timothy Fleri Soler (on loan to Lija Athletic)
8	MF	(Uruguay) URU	Christian Callejas (released)
19	MF	Gozo	Chris Camilleri (loan return to (Gozo) Xewkija Tigers)
—	MF	(Malta) MLT	Matthew Fleri Soler (on loan to Lija Athletic)
—	MF	(Australia) AUS	Leighton Grech (on loan to Vittoriosa Stars)
—	MF	(Malta) MLT	Gary Inguanez (on loan to St. George's)
9	FW	(Malta) MLT	Etienne Barbara (to (United States) Carolina RailHawks)
16	FW	(Malta) MLT	Ben Camilleri (on loan to Qormi)
11	FW	(Portugal) POR	Miguel Nimes Lopes De Pina (released)
22	FW	(Brazil) BRA	Elton Morelato (released)

=== Marsaxlokk ===
In: Note: Flags indicate national team as defined under FIFA eligibility rules; some limited exceptions apply. Players may hold more than one non-FIFA nationality.

No.	Pos.	Nation	Player
—	GK	(Malta) MLT	Luca Bugeja (loan return from Senglea Athletic)
—	GK	(Malta) MLT	Reuben Gauci (loan return from St. Andrews)
—	DF	(Nigeria) NGA	Sunday Eboh (from Floriana)
—	DF	(Malta) MLT	Carlo Mamo (loan return from Birkirkara)
—	DF	(Malta) MLT	Kevin Polidano (from Unknown)
—	DF	(Malta) MLT	Shawn Tellus (loan return from Dingli Swallows)
—	MF	(Malta) MLT	Christian Cassar (on return from Floriana)
—	MF	(Portugal) POR	Ruben Gravata (from (Portugal) Vigor da Mocidade)
—	FW	(Argentina) ARG	Julio Alcorsé (from Sliema Wanderers)
—	FW	(Nigeria) NGA	Alfred Effiong (from Qormi)

Out: Note: Flags indicate national team as defined under FIFA eligibility rules; some limited exceptions apply. Players may hold more than one non-FIFA nationality.

No.	Pos.	Nation	Player
84	GK	(Malta) MLT	Reuben Debono (released)
11	DF	(Malta) MLT	William Camenzuli (on loan to Mosta)
5	DF	(Malta) MLT	David Carabott (retired)
—	DF	(Malta) MLT	Shawn Tellus (on loan to Dingli Swallows)
19	MF	(Malta) MLT	Roderick Bajada (loan return to Sliema Wanderers)
—	MF	(Malta) MLT	Christian Cassar (on loan to Floriana)
10	MF	(Australia) AUS	Leighton Grech (loan return to Hibernians)
35	MF	(Benin) BEN	Florent Raimy (to (Cyprus) Omonia Aradippou)

=== Qormi ===
In: Note: Flags indicate national team as defined under FIFA eligibility rules; some limited exceptions apply. Players may hold more than one non-FIFA nationality.

No.	Pos.	Nation	Player
22	DF	(Malta) MLT	Jonathan Bondin (from Valletta)
15	DF	(Malta) MLT	Luke Sciberras (from St. Patrick)
3	DF	(Belgium) BEL	Jason Vandelannoite (from (England) Sheffield United)
7	MF	(Malta) MLT	Matthew Bartolo (from Sliema Wanderers)
—	MF	(Malta) MLT	Joseph Chetcuti (loan return from Vittoriosa Stars)
26	MF	(Malta) MLT	Cleavon Frendo (on loan from Valletta)
4	MF	(Malta) MLT	Stefan Giglio (from Valletta)
28	MF	(South Korea) KOR	Kang Ho-Jung (from Unknown)
21	MF	(Malta) MLT	George Mallia (from Birkirkara)
—	FW	(Nigeria) NGA	Abubakar Bello-Osagie (from (Brazil) Caxias)
9	FW	(Serbia) SRB	Kosta Bjedov (from Unknown)
16	FW	(Malta) MLT	Ben Camilleri (on loan from Hibernians)

Out: Note: Flags indicate national team as defined under FIFA eligibility rules; some limited exceptions apply. Players may hold more than one non-FIFA nationality.

No.	Pos.	Nation	Player
22	DF	(Malta) MLT	Jonathan Bondin (loan return to Valletta)
2	DF	(Malta) MLT	Duncan Pisani (loan return to Floriana)
4	DF	(Brazil) BRA	Ramón (to Valletta)
23	DF	(Malta) MLT	Kenneth Spiteri (on loan to Mosta)
31	DF	(Malta) MLT	Stephen Wellman (to Vittoriosa Stars)
7	MF	(Malta) MLT	Matthew Bartolo (loan return to Sliema Wanderers)
19	MF	(Malta) MLT	Ryan Deguara (loan return to Mosta)
8	MF	(Malta) MLT	Keith Fenech (loan return to Valletta)
26	MF	(Malta) MLT	Stefan Giglio (loan return to Valletta)
6	MF	(Malta) MLT	Massimo Grima (loan return to Valletta)
17	FW	(Brazil) BRA	Camilo (to (South Korea) Gyeongnam)
99	FW	(Nigeria) NGA	Alfred Effiong (to Marsaxlokk)
18	FW	(Malta) MLT	Steven Meilak (loan return to Ħamrun Spartans)

=== Sliema Wanderers ===
In: Note: Flags indicate national team as defined under FIFA eligibility rules; some limited exceptions apply. Players may hold more than one non-FIFA nationality.

No.	Pos.	Nation	Player
12	GK	(Nigeria) NGA	Ini Etim Akpan (from Unknown)
—	GK	(Malta) MLT	Henry Bonello (loan return from Vittoriosa Stars)
1	GK	(Hungary) HUN	Viktor Szentpéteri (from (Hungary) MTK Hungária)
—	DF	(Malta) MLT	Steve Bezzina (on loan from Valletta)
—	DF	(Malta) MLT	Julian Briffa (from Floriana)
—	DF	(Malta) MLT	Beppe Muscat (loan return from Vittoriosa Stars)
6	DF	(Ivory Coast) CIV	Sékou Tidiane Souare (from (Guinea) Horoya AC)
—	MF	(Portugal) POR	Valdo Gonçalves Alhinho (from Unknown)
—	MF	(Malta) MLT	Roderick Bajada (loan return from Marsaxlokk)
—	MF	(Malta) MLT	Matthew Bartolo (loan return from Qormi)
—	MF	(Malta) MLT	Clint Caruana (loan return from Dingli Swallows)
—	MF	(Malta) MLT	Andre Gove (loan return from Żurrieq)
—	MF	(Malta) MLT	James Paris (from (England) Manchester City)
—	MF	(Malta) MLT	Adam Spiteri (on loan from Msida Saint-Joseph)
—	MF	(Malta) MLT	Julian Vella (loan return from Mosta)
—	FW	(Malta) MLT	Stephen Azzopardi (loan return from Żurrieq)
—	FW	(Malta) MLT	Miguel Ciantar (loan return from Msida Saint-Joseph)
—	FW	(Argentina) ARG	Emiliano Lattes (from Msida Saint-Joseph)
—	FW	(Nigeria) NGA	Obinne Obifuele (from Ħamrun Spartans)

Out: Note: Flags indicate national team as defined under FIFA eligibility rules; some limited exceptions apply. Players may hold more than one non-FIFA nationality.

No.	Pos.	Nation	Player
12	GK	(Malta) MLT	Simon Agius (loan return to Floriana)
3	DF	(Malta) MLT	Ian Azzopardi (to Valletta)
19	DF	(Malta) MLT	Ian Ciantar (released)
—	MF	(Malta) MLT	Matthew Bartolo (to Qormi)
6	MF	(Malta) MLT	Ryan Fenech (loan return to Ħamrun Spartans)
—	MF	(Malta) MLT	Julian Vella (to Tarxien Rainbows)
20	FW	(Argentina) ARG	Julio Alcorsé (to Marsaxlokk)
—	FW	(Argentina) ARG	Emiliano Lattes (to Birkirkara)
22	FW	(Brazil) BRA	Pedrinho (released)
14	FW	(Malta) MLT	Ivan Woods (to Floriana)

=== Tarxien Rainbows ===
In: Note: Flags indicate national team as defined under FIFA eligibility rules; some limited exceptions apply. Players may hold more than one non-FIFA nationality.

No.	Pos.	Nation	Player
12	GK	(Malta) MLT	David Cassar (on loan from Hibernians)
6	DF	(Malta) MLT	Orosco Anonam (from Floriana)
87	DF	(Malta) MLT	Justin Grioli (from Valletta)
11	MF	(Malta) MLT	Sergio Hili (on loan from San Gwann)
10	MF	(Brazil) BRA	Sergio (from (Turkey) Sivasspor)
17	MF	(Malta) MLT	Julian Vella (from Sliema Wanderers)
9	FW	(Brazil) BRA	Cristiano (from (Australia) Adelaide United)
15	FW	(Brazil) BRA	Daniel Mariano Bueno (from (Poland) Odra Wodzisław)
8	FW	(Brazil) BRA	Ricardo Costa (from (Brazil) ABC Futebol Clube)

Out: Note: Flags indicate national team as defined under FIFA eligibility rules; some limited exceptions apply. Players may hold more than one non-FIFA nationality.

No.	Pos.	Nation	Player
12	GK	(Malta) MLT	David Cassar (loan return to Hibernians)
6	DF	(Malta) MLT	Stacey Vella (loan return to Msida Saint-Joseph)
5	MF	(Malta) MLT	David Camilleri (loan return to Valletta)
11	MF	(Malta) MLT	Andrew Decesare (to Birkirkara)
—	MF	(Malta) MLT	Omar Grech (on loan to Gudja United)
77	MF	(Malta) MLT	Kurt Magro (loan return to Valletta)
17	MF	(Brazil) BRA	Denni (to Valletta)
9	FW	(Brazil) BRA	Anderson Ribeiro (to (Ukraine) FC Metalurh Zaporizhya)
15	FW	(Malta) MLT	Warren Chircop (on loan to Hibernians)
14	FW	(Malta) MLT	James Shead (on loan to Mqabba)
—	FW	(Malta) MLT	Simon Shead (on loan to Mosta)

=== Valletta ===
In: Note: Flags indicate national team as defined under FIFA eligibility rules; some limited exceptions apply. Players may hold more than one non-FIFA nationality.

No.	Pos.	Nation	Player
—	DF	(Malta) MLT	Ian Azzopardi (from Sliema Wanderers)
—	DF	(Malta) MLT	Jonathan Bondin (loan return from Qormi)
2	DF	(Malta) MLT	Jonathan Caruana (from Hibernians)
—	DF	(Malta) MLT	Renie Forace (loan return from Balzan Youths)
—	DF	(Malta) MLT	Jonathan Francica (loan return from Balzan Youths)
—	DF	(Malta) MLT	Justin Muscat (loan return from Dingli Swallows)
5	DF	(Brazil) BRA	Ramón (from Qormi)
—	MF	(Malta) MLT	Mark Barbara (loan return from Ħamrun Spartans)
—	MF	(Malta) MLT	Bjorn Bondin (loan return from Balzan Youths)
—	MF	(Malta) MLT	David Camilleri (loan return from Tarxien Rainbows)
19	MF	(Brazil) BRA	Denni (from Tarxien Rainbows)
—	MF	(Malta) MLT	Keith Fenech (loan return from Qormi)
—	MF	(Malta) MLT	Stefan Giglio (loan return from Qormi)
—	MF	(Malta) MLT	Massimo Grima (loan return from Qormi)
16	MF	(Malta) MLT	Kurt Magro (loan return from Tarxien Rainbows)
14	MF	(Nigeria) NGA	Omonigho Temile (from (Nigeria) Warri Wolves)
9	FW	(Malta) MLT	Ian Zammit (loan return from Ħamrun Spartans)
21	FW	(Nigeria) NGA	Joseph Okonkwo (from Dingli Swallows)
—	FW	(Malta) MLT	Dylan Zarb (loan return from Dingli Swallows)

Out: Note: Flags indicate national team as defined under FIFA eligibility rules; some limited exceptions apply. Players may hold more than one non-FIFA nationality.

No.	Pos.	Nation	Player
13	DF	(Malta) MLT	Steve Bezzina (on loan to Sliema Wanderers)
—	DF	(Malta) MLT	Jonathan Bondin (to Qormi)
—	DF	(Malta) MLT	Yessous Camilleri (on loan to Rabat Ajax)
66	DF	(Malta) MLT	Luke Dimech (to (Cyprus) AEK Larnaca)
—	DF	(Malta) MLT	Justin Grioli (to Tarxien Rainbows)
—	DF	(Malta) MLT	Renie Forace (on loan to Balzan Youths)
—	DF	(Malta) MLT	Jonathan Francica (on loan to Balzan Youths)
—	MF	(Malta) MLT	Mark Barbara (on loan to St. George's)
—	MF	(Malta) MLT	Bjorn Bondin (on loan to Balzan Youths)
77	MF	(Netherlands) NED	Jordi Cruyff (retired)
—	MF	(Malta) MLT	David Camilleri (on loan to Ħamrun Spartans)
22	MF	(Malta) MLT	Cleavon Frendo (on loan to Qormi)
—	MF	(Malta) MLT	Stefan Giglio (to Qormi)
19	MF	(Malta) MLT	Dylan Grima (on loan to Balzan Youths)
—	MF	(Malta) MLT	Massimo Grima (on loan to Ħamrun Spartans)
—	MF	(Malta) MLT	Tonio MacKay (on loan from Lija Athletic)
—	FW	(Malta) MLT	Adrian Carabott (on loan to Zejtun Corinthians)
9	FW	(Malta) MLT	Michael Mifsud (released)
21	FW	(Ireland) EIR	Declan O'Brien (to (Republic of Ireland) Athlone Town)
30	FW	(Cameroon) CMR	Njongo Priso (on loan to (Cyprus) AEK Larnaca)

=== Vittoriosa Stars ===
In: Note: Flags indicate national team as defined under FIFA eligibility rules; some limited exceptions apply. Players may hold more than one non-FIFA nationality.

No.	Pos.	Nation	Player
—	GK	(Malta) MLT	Simon Agius (on loan from Floriana)
—	GK	(Malta) MLT	Jean Matthias Vella (from San Gwann)
—	DF	(Malta) MLT	Stephen Wellman (from Qormi)
—	MF	(Malta) MLT	Mauro Brincat (on loan from Floriana)
—	MF	(Malta) MLT	Dino Cachia (from Dingli Swallows)
—	MF	(Brazil) BRA	Carlinos (from (Brazil) Juventude)
—	MF	(Australia) AUS	Leighton Grech (on loan from Hibernians)
—	MF	(Malta) MLT	Kevin Mifsud (from Msida Saint-Joseph)
—	FW	(Nigeria) NGA	Anthony Ewurum (from St. George's)
—	FW	(Brazil) BRA	Jorge (from (Brazil) Rio Claro)

Out: Note: Flags indicate national team as defined under FIFA eligibility rules; some limited exceptions apply. Players may hold more than one non-FIFA nationality.

No.	Pos.	Nation	Player
1	GK	(Malta) MLT	Henry Bonello (loan return to Sliema Wanderers)
23	DF	(Malta) MLT	Brandon Bonnici (loan return to Ghaxaq)
18	DF	(Malta) MLT	Beppe Muscat (loan return to Sliema Wanderers)
20	DF	(Malta) MLT	Jonathan Xerri (loan return to Hibernians)
—	MF	(Malta) MLT	Mauro Brincat (loan return to Floriana)
—	MF	(Malta) MLT	Joseph Chetcuti (loan return to Qormi)
77	MF	(Romania) ROU	Leontin Chitescu (released)
10	MF	(Malta) MLT	Gary Inguanez (loan return to Hibernians)
21	MF	(Malta) MLT	Clayton Micallef (loan return to Hibernians)
22	FW	(Malta) MLT	Paul Camilleri (loan return to Birzebbuga St. Peters)
88	FW	(Nigeria) NGA	Henry Makinwa (released)
9	FW	Gozo	Elton Vella (loan return to (Gozo) Sannat Lions)

== Maltese First Division ==
=== Balzan Youths ===
In: Note: Flags indicate national team as defined under FIFA eligibility rules; some limited exceptions apply. Players may hold more than one non-FIFA nationality.

No.	Pos.	Nation	Player
—	DF	(Malta) MLT	Clifton Ciantar (from Floriana)
—	DF	(Malta) MLT	Renie Forace (on loan from Valletta)
—	DF	(Malta) MLT	Jonathan Francica (on loan from Valletta)
—	MF	(Malta) MLT	Bjorn Bondin (on loan from Valletta)
—	MF	(Malta) MLT	Dylan Grima (on loan from Valletta)
—	FW	(Malta) MLT	Steven Meilak (on loan from Ħamrun Spartans)

Out: Note: Flags indicate national team as defined under FIFA eligibility rules; some limited exceptions apply. Players may hold more than one non-FIFA nationality.

No.	Pos.	Nation	Player
—	DF	(Malta) MLT	Renie Forace (loan return to Valletta)
—	DF	(Malta) MLT	Jonathan Francica (loan return to Valletta)
—	MF	(Malta) MLT	Bjorn Bondin (loan return to Valletta)
—	FW	(Malta) MLT	Simon Shead (loan return to Tarxien Rainbows)

=== Dingli Swallows ===
In: Note: Flags indicate national team as defined under FIFA eligibility rules; some limited exceptions apply. Players may hold more than one non-FIFA nationality.

No.	Pos.	Nation	Player
—	DF	(Malta) MLT	Shawn Tellus (on loan from Marsaxlokk)

Out: Note: Flags indicate national team as defined under FIFA eligibility rules; some limited exceptions apply. Players may hold more than one non-FIFA nationality.

No.	Pos.	Nation	Player
18	DF	(Malta) MLT	Matthew Borg (to St. Andrews)
8	DF	(Malta) MLT	Justin Muscat (loan return to Valletta)
—	DF	(Malta) MLT	Alex Portelli (to Mellieha)
6	DF	(Malta) MLT	Shawn Tellus (loan return to Marsaxlokk)
17	MF	(Malta) MLT	Kevin Borg (loan return to Ħamrun Spartans)
15	MF	(Malta) MLT	Dino Cachia (to Vittoriosa Stars)
3	MF	(Malta) MLT	Clint Caruana (loan return to Sliema Wanderers)
9	MF	(Nigeria) NGA	Haruna Doda (released)
13	MF	(Malta) MLT	Christian Muscat (loan return to Rabat Ajax)
19	MF	(Brazil) BRA	André Rocha da Silva (to Naxxar Lions)
20	FW	(Nigeria) NGA	Joseph Okonkwo (to Valletta)
23	FW	(Malta) MLT	Dylan Zarb (loan return to Valletta)

=== Lija Athletic ===
In: Note: Flags indicate national team as defined under FIFA eligibility rules; some limited exceptions apply. Players may hold more than one non-FIFA nationality.

No.	Pos.	Nation	Player
—	GK	(Malta) MLT	Sean Mintoff (from St. Patrick)
—	DF	(Malta) MLT	Dalton Caruana (on loan from Ħamrun Spartans)
—	DF	(Malta) MLT	Timothy Fleri Soler (on loan from Hibernians)
—	MF	(Malta) MLT	Matthew Fleri Soler (on loan from Hibernians)
—	MF	(Malta) MLT	Tonio MacKay (on loan from Valletta)
—	FW	(Malta) MLT	Wayne Borg St. John (from Mellieha)
—	FW	(Malta) MLT	Ayrton Buhagiar (from Mdina Knights)

Out: Note: Flags indicate national team as defined under FIFA eligibility rules; some limited exceptions apply. Players may hold more than one non-FIFA nationality.

No.	Pos.	Nation	Player
—	FW	(Malta) MLT	Daniel Cremona (on loan to Mellieha)

=== Melita ===
In: Note: Flags indicate national team as defined under FIFA eligibility rules; some limited exceptions apply. Players may hold more than one non-FIFA nationality.

No.	Pos.	Nation	Player

Out: Note: Flags indicate national team as defined under FIFA eligibility rules; some limited exceptions apply. Players may hold more than one non-FIFA nationality.

No.	Pos.	Nation	Player

=== Mosta ===
In: Note: Flags indicate national team as defined under FIFA eligibility rules; some limited exceptions apply. Players may hold more than one non-FIFA nationality.

No.	Pos.	Nation	Player
—	DF	(Malta) MLT	William Camenzuli (on loan from Marsaxlokk)
—	DF	(Malta) MLT	Kenneth Spiteri (on loan from Qormi)
—	MF	(Malta) MLT	Ryan Deguara (loan return from Qormi)
—	FW	(Malta) MLT	Simon Shead (on loan from Tarxien Rainbows)

Out: Note: Flags indicate national team as defined under FIFA eligibility rules; some limited exceptions apply. Players may hold more than one non-FIFA nationality.

No.	Pos.	Nation	Player
24	MF	(Malta) MLT	Luke Stivala (loan return to Birkirkara)
7	MF	(Malta) MLT	Julian Vella (loan return to Sliema Wanderers)
8	FW	(Malta) MLT	Terence Vella (loan return to Gudja United)

=== Mqabba ===
In: Note: Flags indicate national team as defined under FIFA eligibility rules; some limited exceptions apply. Players may hold more than one non-FIFA nationality.

No.	Pos.	Nation	Player
—	DF	(Malta) MLT	John Debattista (on loan from Ħamrun Spartans)
—	MF	(Malta) MLT	Marlon Briffa (loan return from Floriana)
—	MF	(Malta) MLT	Mauro Grioli (on loan from Floriana)
—	FW	(Malta) MLT	James Shead (on loan from Tarxien Rainbows)

Out: Note: Flags indicate national team as defined under FIFA eligibility rules; some limited exceptions apply. Players may hold more than one non-FIFA nationality.

No.	Pos.	Nation	Player
18	DF	(Malta) MLT	John Debattista (loan return to Ħamrun Spartans)
—	DF	(Malta) MLT	Patrick Borg (loan return to Birkirkara)
—	MF	(Malta) MLT	Martin Anastasi (loan return to Birkirkara)
—	MF	(Malta) MLT	Mark Gauci (loan return to Floriana)

=== Msida Saint-Joseph ===
In: Note: Flags indicate national team as defined under FIFA eligibility rules; some limited exceptions apply. Players may hold more than one non-FIFA nationality.

No.	Pos.	Nation	Player
—	DF	(Malta) MLT	Stacey Vella (loan return from Tarxien Rainbows)

Out: Note: Flags indicate national team as defined under FIFA eligibility rules; some limited exceptions apply. Players may hold more than one non-FIFA nationality.

No.	Pos.	Nation	Player
26	GK	(Malta) MLT	Manuel Bartolo (on loan to Birkirkara)
22	DF	(Malta) MLT	Tyrone Farrugia (to Floriana)
—	DF	(Malta) MLT	Stacey Vella (to Swieqi United)
—	MF	(Malta) MLT	Iro Curmi (loan return to Birkirkara)
14	MF	(Serbia) SRB	Zoran Levnaić (to Hibernians)
8	MF	(Malta) MLT	Kevin Mifsud (to Vittoriosa Stars)
—	MF	(Malta) MLT	Adam Spiteri (on loan to Sliema Wanderers)
18	FW	(Malta) MLT	Miguel Ciantar (loan return to Sliema Wanderers)
19	FW	(Democratic Republic of the Congo) COD	N'Dayi Kalenga (to Pietà Hotspurs)
10	FW	(Argentina) ARG	Emiliano Lattes (to Sliema Wanderers)

=== Pietà Hotspurs ===
In: Note: Flags indicate national team as defined under FIFA eligibility rules; some limited exceptions apply. Players may hold more than one non-FIFA nationality.

No.	Pos.	Nation	Player
—	MF	(Malta) MLT	Andrew Scerri (from Pembroke Athleta)
—	MF	(Malta) MLT	Matthew Spiteri (loan return from Żurrieq)
—	FW	(Democratic Republic of the Congo) COD	N'Dayi Kalenga (from Msida Saint-Joseph)

Out: Note: Flags indicate national team as defined under FIFA eligibility rules; some limited exceptions apply. Players may hold more than one non-FIFA nationality.

No.	Pos.	Nation	Player

=== St. Andrews ===
In: Note: Flags indicate national team as defined under FIFA eligibility rules; some limited exceptions apply. Players may hold more than one non-FIFA nationality.

No.	Pos.	Nation	Player
—	DF	(Malta) MLT	Matthew Borg (from Dingli Swallows)
—	DF	(Denmark) DEN	Ronni Hartvig (from FC Scandinavia)

Out: Note: Flags indicate national team as defined under FIFA eligibility rules; some limited exceptions apply. Players may hold more than one non-FIFA nationality.

No.	Pos.	Nation	Player
—	GK	(Malta) MLT	Reuben Gauci (loan return to Marsaxlokk)

=== St. George's ===
In: Note: Flags indicate national team as defined under FIFA eligibility rules; some limited exceptions apply. Players may hold more than one non-FIFA nationality.

No.	Pos.	Nation	Player
—	GK	(Malta) MLT	Thomas Galea (on loan from Hibernians)
—	DF	(Malta) MLT	Benoir Fenech (on loan from Hibernians)
—	MF	(Malta) MLT	Mark Barbara (on loan from Valletta)
—	MF	(Malta) MLT	Gary Inguanez (on loan from Hibernians)
—	MF	(Malta) MLT	Luke Stivala (on loan from Birkirkara)
—	FW	(Malta) MLT	Joseph Mizzi (loan return from Żurrieq)

Out: Note: Flags indicate national team as defined under FIFA eligibility rules; some limited exceptions apply. Players may hold more than one non-FIFA nationality.

No.	Pos.	Nation	Player
—	MF	(Malta) MLT	Silvio Sciberras (to Zejtun Corinthians)
—	FW	(Nigeria) NGA	Anthony Ewurum (to Vittoriosa Stars)

== Manager Transfers ==
Name	Moving from	Moving to	Source
(Malta) Jesmond Zerafa	Qormi	Valletta	
(Netherlands) Jordi Cruyff	Valletta assistant manager	(Cyprus) AEK Larnaca technical director	
(Netherlands) Ton Caanen	Valletta	(Cyprus) AEK Larnaca	
(Malta) Jesmond Zammit	Dingli Swallows	released	
(Malta) Jesmond Zerafa	unattached	Valletta	
(Malta) Jesmond Zammit	unattached	Valletta team manager	
(Malta) Stephen Azzopardi	unattached	Qormi	
(Serbia) Zoran Popovic	Floriana	released	
(Bulgaria) Todor Raykov	unattached	Floriana	
(Malta) Robert Magro	unattached	Dingli Swallows	
(Malta) Keith Gouder	Msida Saint-Joseph	released	
(Malta) Iro Curmi	unattached	Msida Saint-Joseph	

== See also ==
- (Netherlands) List of Dutch football transfers summer 2010
- (England) List of English football transfers summer 2010
- (France) List of French football transfers summer 2010
- (Germany) List of German football transfers summer 2010
- (Italy) List of Italian football transfers summer 2010
- (Latvia) List of Latvian football transfers summer 2010
- (Portugal) List of Portuguese football transfers summer 2010
- (Scotland) List of Scottish football transfers 2010–11
- (Spain) List of Spanish football transfers summer 2010
