= List of Maltese football transfers summer 2014 =

This is a list of Maltese football transfers for the 2014–15 summer transfer window by club. Only transfers of clubs in the Maltese Premier League and Maltese First Division are included.

The summer transfer window opened on 1 July 2014, although a few transfers may take place prior to that date. The window closed at midnight on 31 August 2014. Players without a club may join one at any time, either during or in between transfer windows.

== Maltese Premier League ==
=== Balzan ===
Manager: (Malta) Oliver Spiteri

In: Note: Flags indicate national team as defined under FIFA eligibility rules; some limited exceptions apply. Players may hold more than one non-FIFA nationality.

No.	Pos.	Nation	Player
—	FW	(Malta) MLT	Jean Pierre Mifsud Triganza (from Valletta)
—	FW	(Italy) ITA	Gianmarco Piccioni (from Mosta)
—	FW	(Brazil) BRA	Silas Junior (from (Brazil) Castelense)

Out: Note: Flags indicate national team as defined under FIFA eligibility rules; some limited exceptions apply. Players may hold more than one non-FIFA nationality.

No.	Pos.	Nation	Player
16	FW	(Brazil) BRA	Pedrinho (to Mosta)

=== Birkirkara ===
Manager: (Malta) Paul Zammit

In: Note: Flags indicate national team as defined under FIFA eligibility rules; some limited exceptions apply. Players may hold more than one non-FIFA nationality.

No.	Pos.	Nation	Player
—	GK	(Spain) ESP	Adrián Murcia (from (Spain) UD Salamanca)
—	MF	(Malta) MLT	Edmond Agius (from Valletta)
—	FW	(Brazil) BRA	Eliandro (from (Brazil) Cruzeiro)
—	FW	(Brazil) BRA	Rafael Ledesma (from (Cyprus) Ethnikos Achna)
—	FW	(Brazil) BRA	Liliu (from (Israel) Hapoel Ra'anana)

Out: Note: Flags indicate national team as defined under FIFA eligibility rules; some limited exceptions apply. Players may hold more than one non-FIFA nationality.

No.	Pos.	Nation	Player
24	DF	(Malta) MLT	Rowen Muscat (to (Hungary) Dunaújváros PASE)
23	FW	(Brazil) BRA	Jhonnattann
—	FW	(Brazil) BRA	Calheira (to (El Salvador) C.D. Águila)

=== Floriana ===
Manager: (Italy) Giovanni Tedesco

In: Note: Flags indicate national team as defined under FIFA eligibility rules; some limited exceptions apply. Players may hold more than one non-FIFA nationality.

No.	Pos.	Nation	Player
—	MF	(Brazil) BRA	Emerson Marcelina (Free agent)
—	FW	(Malta) MLT	Giovanni Galea (on loan from Sirens)
—	FW	(Italy) ITA	Matteo Piciollo (from (Italy) Ostia Mare Lido)
—	FW	(Malta) MLT	Steve Pisani (from Hibernians)

Out: Note: Flags indicate national team as defined under FIFA eligibility rules; some limited exceptions apply. Players may hold more than one non-FIFA nationality.

No.	Pos.	Nation	Player
—	MF	(Brazil) BRA	Diogo Pinheiro

=== Hibernians ===
Manager: (Serbia) Branko Nisevic

In: Note: Flags indicate national team as defined under FIFA eligibility rules; some limited exceptions apply. Players may hold more than one non-FIFA nationality.

No.	Pos.	Nation	Player
—	DF	(Equatorial Guinea) EQG	Rui Da Gracia (from (Spain) Real Ávila)
—	FW	(Brazil) BRA	Jorginho (from Qormi)

Out: Note: Flags indicate national team as defined under FIFA eligibility rules; some limited exceptions apply. Players may hold more than one non-FIFA nationality.

No.	Pos.	Nation	Player
5	DF	(Malta) MLT	Ryan Camilleri (to Valletta)
—	DF	(Malta) MLT	Dylan Sammut (to Pembroke Athleta)
—	MF	(Malta) MLT	Ayrton Azzopardi (to Pembroke Athleta)
16	MF	(Serbia) SRB	Zoran Levnaić (to Qormi)
20	FW	(Nigeria) NGA	Obinna Obiefule (to Zebbug Rangers)
27	FW	(Malta) MLT	Steve Pisani (to Floriana)

=== Mosta ===
Manager: (Italy) Enrico Piccioni

In: Note: Flags indicate national team as defined under FIFA eligibility rules; some limited exceptions apply. Players may hold more than one non-FIFA nationality.

No.	Pos.	Nation	Player
—	MF	(Malta) MLT	Dyson Falzon (on loan from Valletta)
—	FW	(Brazil) BRA	Daniel Mariano Bueno (on loan from Tarxien Rainbows)
—	FW	(Brazil) BRA	Pedrinho (from Balzan)

Out: Note: Flags indicate national team as defined under FIFA eligibility rules; some limited exceptions apply. Players may hold more than one non-FIFA nationality.

No.	Pos.	Nation	Player
—	DF	(Malta) MLT	Alex Cini (on loan to Tarxien Rainbows)
—	DF	(Malta) MLT	Kane Paul Farrugia (on loan to Tarxien Rainbows)
—	MF	(Brazil) BRA	Mandinho (to FK Ekranas)
—	MF	(Brazil) BRA	Ricardinho (to Msida St. Joseph)
—	FW	(Italy) ITA	Gianmarco Piccioni (to Balzan)
—	FW	(Brazil) BRA	Yuri (to Msida St. Joseph)
—	FW	(Brazil) BRA	Diego Chibanca (to Msida St. Joseph)
—	FW	(Brazil) BRA	Cristian Fernandes

=== Naxxar Lions ===
In: Note: Flags indicate national team as defined under FIFA eligibility rules; some limited exceptions apply. Players may hold more than one non-FIFA nationality.

No.	Pos.	Nation	Player

Out: Note: Flags indicate national team as defined under FIFA eligibility rules; some limited exceptions apply. Players may hold more than one non-FIFA nationality.

No.	Pos.	Nation	Player

=== Qormi ===
Manager: (Malta) Josef Mansueto

In: Note: Flags indicate national team as defined under FIFA eligibility rules; some limited exceptions apply. Players may hold more than one non-FIFA nationality.

No.	Pos.	Nation	Player
—	MF	(Serbia) SRB	Zoran Levnaić (from Hibernians)

Out: Note: Flags indicate national team as defined under FIFA eligibility rules; some limited exceptions apply. Players may hold more than one non-FIFA nationality.

No.	Pos.	Nation	Player
8	MF	(Malta) MLT	Roderick Bajada (to Pembroke Athleta)
—	MF	(Brazil) BRA	Gabriel (to Pietà Hotspurs)
—	FW	(Brazil) BRA	Jorginho (to Hibernians F.C.)

=== Pietà Hotspurs ===
In: Note: Flags indicate national team as defined under FIFA eligibility rules; some limited exceptions apply. Players may hold more than one non-FIFA nationality.

No.	Pos.	Nation	Player
—	DF	(Brazil) BRA	Léo Fortunato (from (Iraq) Zakho FC)
—	MF	(Argentina) ARG	Claudio Francés
—	MF	(Brazil) BRA	Gabriel (from Qormi FC)
—	MF	(Brazil) BRA	Rafael Rodrigues
—	FW	(Malta) MLT	Malcolm Licari (from Rabat Ajax)
—	FW	(Brazil) BRA	Rafael Xavier (from (Brazil) Brasil de Farroupilha)

Out: Note: Flags indicate national team as defined under FIFA eligibility rules; some limited exceptions apply. Players may hold more than one non-FIFA nationality.

No.	Pos.	Nation	Player
—	FW	(Cameroon) CMR	Raphael Alain Kooh Sohna (to Valletta)

=== Sliema Wanderers ===
In: Note: Flags indicate national team as defined under FIFA eligibility rules; some limited exceptions apply. Players may hold more than one non-FIFA nationality.

No.	Pos.	Nation	Player
—	FW	(Malta) MLT	Michael Mifsud (from (Australia) Melbourne City)

Out: Note: Flags indicate national team as defined under FIFA eligibility rules; some limited exceptions apply. Players may hold more than one non-FIFA nationality.

No.	Pos.	Nation	Player
25	MF	(Argentina) ARG	Matias Muchardi (to Zebbug Rangers)

=== Tarxien Rainbows ===
Manager: (Malta) Clive Mizzi

In: Note: Flags indicate national team as defined under FIFA eligibility rules; some limited exceptions apply. Players may hold more than one non-FIFA nationality.

No.	Pos.	Nation	Player
—	DF	(Malta) MLT	Alex Cini (on loan from Mosta)
—	DF	(Malta) MLT	Kane Paul Farrugia (on loan from Mosta)
—	DF	(Brazil) BRA	Alessandro Lopes (from (Brazil) Arapongas)
—	FW	(Brazil) BRA	Branquinho (from (Brazil) Linense)

Out: Note: Flags indicate national team as defined under FIFA eligibility rules; some limited exceptions apply. Players may hold more than one non-FIFA nationality.

No.	Pos.	Nation	Player
28	GK	(Malta) MLT	Nicky Vella (to Valletta)
20	FW	(Brazil) BRA	Daniel Mariano Bueno (on loan to Mosta)

=== Valletta ===
Manager: (Malta) Gilbert Agius

In: Note: Flags indicate national team as defined under FIFA eligibility rules; some limited exceptions apply. Players may hold more than one non-FIFA nationality.

No.	Pos.	Nation	Player
28	GK	(Malta) MLT	Nicky Vella (from Tarxien Rainbows)
5	DF	(Malta) MLT	Ryan Camilleri (from Hibernians)
25	MF	(Australia) AUS	Adrian Zahra (from (Australia) Perth Glory)
—	FW	(Cameroon) CMR	Raphael Alain Kooh Sohna (from Pietà Hotspurs)

Out: Note: Flags indicate national team as defined under FIFA eligibility rules; some limited exceptions apply. Players may hold more than one non-FIFA nationality.

No.	Pos.	Nation	Player
24	GK	(Georgia (country)) GEO	Nukri Revishvili (to (Russia) FC Tosno)
4	DF	(Malta) MLT	Steve Borg (to (South Africa) Platinum Stars)
—	DF	(Malta) MLT	Yessous Camilleri (on loan to Zebbug Rangers)
—	DF	(Malta) MLT	Kenneth Scicluna (to Vittoriosa Stars)
8	MF	(Malta) MLT	Edmond Agius (to Birkirkara)
19	MF	(Brazil) BRA	Denni (released)
20	MF	(Malta) MLT	Dyson Falzon (on loan to Mosta)
20	MF	(Georgia (country)) GEO	Irakli Maisuradze (to (Cyprus) Anorthosis Famagusta)
9	FW	(Malta) MLT	Jean Pierre Mifsud Triganza (to Balzan)

=== Zebbug Rangers ===
In: Note: Flags indicate national team as defined under FIFA eligibility rules; some limited exceptions apply. Players may hold more than one non-FIFA nationality.

No.	Pos.	Nation	Player
—	DF	(Malta) MLT	Yessous Camilleri (from Valletta)
—	MF	(Argentina) ARG	Matias Muchardi (from Sliema Wanderers)
—	FW	(Nigeria) NGA	Obinna Obiefule (from Hibernians)

Out: Note: Flags indicate national team as defined under FIFA eligibility rules; some limited exceptions apply. Players may hold more than one non-FIFA nationality.

No.	Pos.	Nation	Player
—	MF	(Malta) MLT	Omar Rababah (on loan to Vittoriosa Stars)

== Maltese First Division ==
=== Birzebbuga St.Peters ===
In: Note: Flags indicate national team as defined under FIFA eligibility rules; some limited exceptions apply. Players may hold more than one non-FIFA nationality.

No.	Pos.	Nation	Player

Out: Note: Flags indicate national team as defined under FIFA eligibility rules; some limited exceptions apply. Players may hold more than one non-FIFA nationality.

No.	Pos.	Nation	Player

=== Fgura United ===
In: Note: Flags indicate national team as defined under FIFA eligibility rules; some limited exceptions apply. Players may hold more than one non-FIFA nationality.

No.	Pos.	Nation	Player

Out: Note: Flags indicate national team as defined under FIFA eligibility rules; some limited exceptions apply. Players may hold more than one non-FIFA nationality.

No.	Pos.	Nation	Player

=== Gudja United ===
Manager: (Malta) Alan Mifsud

In: Note: Flags indicate national team as defined under FIFA eligibility rules; some limited exceptions apply. Players may hold more than one non-FIFA nationality.

No.	Pos.	Nation	Player
—	MF	(Malta) MLT	Udo Nwoko (free agent)

Out: Note: Flags indicate national team as defined under FIFA eligibility rules; some limited exceptions apply. Players may hold more than one non-FIFA nationality.

No.	Pos.	Nation	Player

=== Gżira United ===
In: Note: Flags indicate national team as defined under FIFA eligibility rules; some limited exceptions apply. Players may hold more than one non-FIFA nationality.

No.	Pos.	Nation	Player

Out: Note: Flags indicate national team as defined under FIFA eligibility rules; some limited exceptions apply. Players may hold more than one non-FIFA nationality.

No.	Pos.	Nation	Player

=== Lija Athletic ===
Manager: (Malta) Joe Brincat

In: Note: Flags indicate national team as defined under FIFA eligibility rules; some limited exceptions apply. Players may hold more than one non-FIFA nationality.

No.	Pos.	Nation	Player

Out: Note: Flags indicate national team as defined under FIFA eligibility rules; some limited exceptions apply. Players may hold more than one non-FIFA nationality.

No.	Pos.	Nation	Player

=== Melita ===
Manager: (Malta) Neil Zarb Cousin

In: Note: Flags indicate national team as defined under FIFA eligibility rules; some limited exceptions apply. Players may hold more than one non-FIFA nationality.

No.	Pos.	Nation	Player

Out: Note: Flags indicate national team as defined under FIFA eligibility rules; some limited exceptions apply. Players may hold more than one non-FIFA nationality.

No.	Pos.	Nation	Player

=== Msida Saint-Joseph ===
In: Note: Flags indicate national team as defined under FIFA eligibility rules; some limited exceptions apply. Players may hold more than one non-FIFA nationality.

No.	Pos.	Nation	Player

Out: Note: Flags indicate national team as defined under FIFA eligibility rules; some limited exceptions apply. Players may hold more than one non-FIFA nationality.

No.	Pos.	Nation	Player

=== Mqabba ===
In: Note: Flags indicate national team as defined under FIFA eligibility rules; some limited exceptions apply. Players may hold more than one non-FIFA nationality.

No.	Pos.	Nation	Player

Out: Note: Flags indicate national team as defined under FIFA eligibility rules; some limited exceptions apply. Players may hold more than one non-FIFA nationality.

No.	Pos.	Nation	Player

=== Pembroke Athleta ===
Manager: (Malta) Jacques Scerri

In: Note: Flags indicate national team as defined under FIFA eligibility rules; some limited exceptions apply. Players may hold more than one non-FIFA nationality.

No.	Pos.	Nation	Player
—	DF	(Malta) MLT	Dylan Sammut (from Hibernians)
—	DF	(Guinea) GUI	Ousmane Sidibé (from Vittoriosa Stars)
—	MF	(Malta) MLT	Ayrton Azzopardi (from Hibernians)
—	MF	(Malta) MLT	Glenn Azzopardi (from Ħamrun Spartans)
—	MF	(Malta) MLT	Roderick Bajada (from Qormi)
—	MF	(Malta) MLT	Elton Vella (from Zejtun Corinthians)

Out: Note: Flags indicate national team as defined under FIFA eligibility rules; some limited exceptions apply. Players may hold more than one non-FIFA nationality.

No.	Pos.	Nation	Player

=== Rabat Ajax ===
In: Note: Flags indicate national team as defined under FIFA eligibility rules; some limited exceptions apply. Players may hold more than one non-FIFA nationality.

No.	Pos.	Nation	Player

Out: Note: Flags indicate national team as defined under FIFA eligibility rules; some limited exceptions apply. Players may hold more than one non-FIFA nationality.

No.	Pos.	Nation	Player

=== St. Andrews ===
In: Note: Flags indicate national team as defined under FIFA eligibility rules; some limited exceptions apply. Players may hold more than one non-FIFA nationality.

No.	Pos.	Nation	Player

Out: Note: Flags indicate national team as defined under FIFA eligibility rules; some limited exceptions apply. Players may hold more than one non-FIFA nationality.

No.	Pos.	Nation	Player

=== St. George's ===
In: Note: Flags indicate national team as defined under FIFA eligibility rules; some limited exceptions apply. Players may hold more than one non-FIFA nationality.

No.	Pos.	Nation	Player

Out: Note: Flags indicate national team as defined under FIFA eligibility rules; some limited exceptions apply. Players may hold more than one non-FIFA nationality.

No.	Pos.	Nation	Player

=== Vittoriosa Stars ===
In: Note: Flags indicate national team as defined under FIFA eligibility rules; some limited exceptions apply. Players may hold more than one non-FIFA nationality.

No.	Pos.	Nation	Player
—	DF	(Malta) MLT	Kenneth Scicluna (from Valletta)
—	MF	(Malta) MLT	Omar Rababah (on loan from Zebbug Rangers)

Out: Note: Flags indicate national team as defined under FIFA eligibility rules; some limited exceptions apply. Players may hold more than one non-FIFA nationality.

No.	Pos.	Nation	Player
—	DF	(Guinea) GUI	Ousmane Sidibé (to Pembroke Athleta)

=== Żurrieq ===
In: Note: Flags indicate national team as defined under FIFA eligibility rules; some limited exceptions apply. Players may hold more than one non-FIFA nationality.

No.	Pos.	Nation	Player

Out: Note: Flags indicate national team as defined under FIFA eligibility rules; some limited exceptions apply. Players may hold more than one non-FIFA nationality.

No.	Pos.	Nation	Player

== See also ==
- (Bulgaria) List of Bulgarian football transfers summer 2014
- (Netherlands) List of Dutch football transfers summer 2014
- (England) List of English football transfers summer 2014
- (France) List of French football transfers summer 2014
- (Germany) List of German football transfers summer 2014
- (Italy) List of Italian football transfers summer 2014
- (Portugal) List of Portuguese football transfers summer 2014
- (Spain) List of Spanish football transfers summer 2014
