= 2007–08 Maltese First Division knock-out =

2007–08 First Division Knock-Out
Tournament details
- Country: Malta
- Dates: 18 November 2007 – 1 June 2008
- Teams: 10

Final positions
- Champions: Dingli Swallows
- Runners-up: Vittoriosa Stars

Tournament statistics
- Matches played: 9
- Goals scored: 31 (3.44 per match)

The 2007–08 Maltese First Division Knock-Out (known as Maltco Lotteries First Division Knock-Out due to sponsorship reasons) was a knockout tournament for Maltese football clubs playing in the First Division. The winners were Dingli Swallows and the runners-up were Vittoriosa Stars.

The competition began on 18 November 2007 and ended on 1 June 2008 with the final.

The competition began with a preliminary round. Four teams played in the preliminary round. The two winners of the preliminary round advanced to the quarter-finals with the rest teams from the First Division. The four winners from the quarter-finals, which were Dingli Swallows, Mosta, Tarxien Rainbows and Vittoriosa Stars, advanced to the semi-finals.

== Preliminary round ==
Team 1	Score	Team 2
18 November 2007
St. Patrick	1–3	Tarxien Rainbows
Senglea Athletic	2–1	Qormi

== Quarter-finals ==
Team 1	Score	Team 2
12 April 2008
Senglea Athletic	1–2	Tarxien Rainbows
13 April 2008
Mosta	2–0	Mellieħa
Vittoriosa Stars	3–2	St.George's
15 April 2008
Marsa	1–2	Dingli Swallows

== Semi-finals ==
Team 1	Score	Team 2
27 May 2008
Tarxien Rainbows	1–3	Vittoriosa Stars
Dingli Swallows	2–1	Mosta

== Final ==
Team 1	Score	Team 2
1 June 2008
Vittoriosa Stars	1–3	Dingli Swallows

== See also ==
- 2007–08 Maltese First Division
