= 2010–11 Maltese First Division knock-out =

2010–11 First Division Knock-Out
Tournament details
- Country: Malta
- Dates: 18 September 2010 – 13 May 2011
- Teams: 10

Final positions
- Champions: Dingli Swallows
- Runners-up: Balzan Youths

Tournament statistics
- Matches played: 23
- Goals scored: 71 (3.09 per match)

The 2010–11 Maltese First Division Knock-Out was a knockout tournament for Maltese football clubs playing in the First Division. The competition was held between 18 September 2010 and 13 May 2011, with the winners being Dingli Swallows.

== Group stage ==
=== Group 1 ===
Pos	Team	Pld	W	D	L	GF	GA	GD	Pts	Qualification	LJA	BAL	MOS	MEL	MSJ
1	Lija Athletic	4	3	1	0	10	3	+7	10	Advance to knockout phase	—	1–1	3–0	3–2	3–0
2	Balzan Youths	4	2	2	0	8	4	+4	8	Advance to knockout phase		—	2–2	3–1	2–0
3	Mosta	4	1	2	1	8	7	+1	5				—	2–2	4–0
4	Melita	4	1	1	2	10	8	+2	4					—	5–0
5	Msida Saint-Joseph	4	0	0	4	0	14	−14	0						—

Source: MaltaFootball.com

=== Group 2 ===
Pos	Team	Pld	W	D	L	GF	GA	GD	Pts	Qualification	MGA	DIN	PIE	STG	STA
1	Mqabba	4	4	0	0	8	1	+7	12	Advance to knockout phase	—	3–0	3–1	1–0	1–0
2	Dingli Swallows	4	2	1	1	4	5	−1	7	Advance to knockout phase		—	1–0	2–1	1–1
3	Pietà Hotspurs	4	1	1	2	5	6	−1	4				—	3–1	1–1
4	St. George's	4	1	0	3	4	6	−2	3					—	2–0
5	St. Andrews	4	0	2	2	2	5	−3	2						—

Source: MaltaFootball.com

== Knockout phase ==
=== Semi-finals ===
Team 1	Score	Team 2
7 May 2011
Lija Athletic	2–3	Dingli Swallows
Mqabba	0–2	Balzan Youths

=== Final ===
Team 1	Score	Team 2
13 May 2011
Dingli Swallows	3–2	Balzan Youths

== See also ==
- 2010–11 Maltese First Division
