= 2006–07 Maltese First Division knock-out =

2006–07 First Division Knock-Out
Tournament details
- Country: Malta
- Dates: 18 November 2006 – 24 May 2007
- Teams: 10

Final positions
- Champions: Tarxien Rainbows
- Runners-up: Mosta

Tournament statistics
- Matches played: 9
- Goals scored: 29 (3.22 per match)

The 2006–07 Maltese First Division Knock-Out (known as EuroSport First Division Knock-Out due to sponsorship reasons) was a knockout tournament for Maltese football clubs playing in the First Division. The winners were Tarxien Rainbows and the runner-up were Mosta.

The competition began on 18 November 2006 and ended on 24 May 2007 with the final.

The competition began with the preliminary round. Four teams played in the preliminary round. The two winners from the preliminary round advanced to the quarter-finals with the rest of the teams of the First Division. The four winners of the quarter-finals, which were Mosta, Senglea Athletic, St. Patrick and Tarxien Rainbows advanced to the semi-finals.

== Preliminary round ==
Team 1	Score	Team 2
18 November 2006
Ħamrun Spartans	0–1 (a.e.t.)	Senglea Athletic
Mqabba	3–0	Naxxar Lions

== Quarter-finals ==
Team 1	Score	Team 2
7 April 2007
Vittoriosa Stars	1–3	Senglea Athletic
St. Patrick	3–1	Qormi
8 April 2007
Mosta	3–1	San Gwann
Tarxien Rainbows	2–1	Mqabba

== Semi-finals ==
Team 1	Score	Team 2
19 May 2007
Senglea Athletic	1–4	Mosta
Tarxien Rainbows	1–1 (a.e.t.) (5–4 p)	St. Patrick

== Final ==
Team 1	Score	Team 2
24 May 2007
Mosta	1–2	Tarxien Rainbows

== See also ==
- 2006–07 Maltese First Division
