= Zoran Levnaić =

Serbian footballer

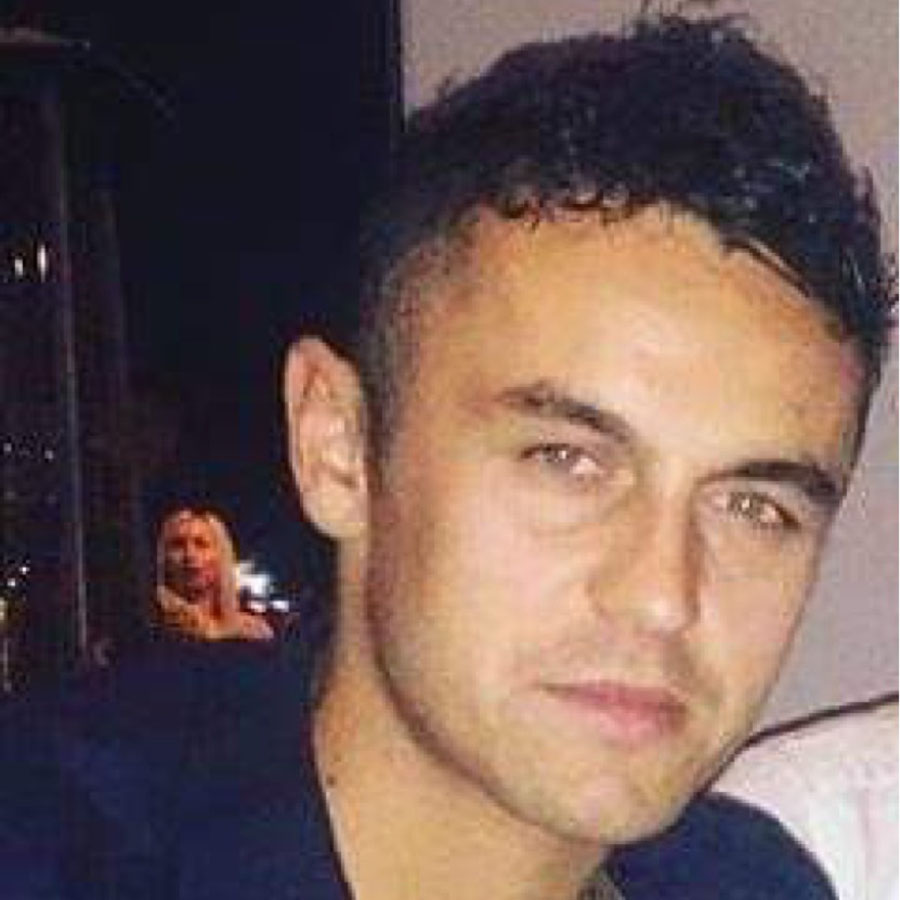

Personal information
- Date of birth: 4 April 1987 (age 39)
- Place of birth: Otočac, SFR Yugoslavia
- Height: 5 ft 11 in (1.80 m)
- Position: Midfielder

Youth career
- Partizan

Senior career*
Years	Team	Apps	(Gls)
2007–2008	Floriana	24	(1)
2008–2009	Ħamrun Spartans	22	(2)
2009–2010	Msida	18	(1)
2010–2011	Hibernians	13	(0)
2011	Al-Salmiya		
2012	Oikonomos	18	(0)
2012–2014	Hibernians	49	(2)
2014–2015	Qormi	30	(1)
2015–2017	Pembroke Athleta	58	(1)
2017–2019	Inter Leipzig		

Managerial career
- 2019–2020: Inter Leipzig
- 2023: Bečej
- * Club domestic league appearances and goals

Zoran Levnaić (born 4 April 1987) is a Serbian football manager and former player. As a player, he spent most of his career playing as a midfielder.

== Playing career ==
Levnaić was born in Otočac, Croatia, but began playing football in the youth squads of FK Partizan.

Up to 2010 he played for the Maltese sides of Hibernians, Floriana and Hamrun Spartans. In January 2011 he moved to Kuwaiti side Al-Salmiya SC and in August 2011 to Oikonomos Tsaritsani, who were then playing in the Greek Football League 2.
