= Bjedov =

Bjedov is a Slavic surname that may refer to

- Đurđica Bjedov (born 1947), Yugoslav swimmer
- Gojko Bjedov (1913–1937), Yugoslav volunteer in the Spanish War
- Goran Bjedov (born 1971), Croatian basketball coach
- Kosta Bjedov (born 1986), Serbian-Croatian football player
- Mira Bjedov (born 1955), Yugoslav basketball player
- Nina Bjedov (born 1971), Serbian basketball player
