= N'Dayi Kalenga (footballer, born 1978) =

Congolese footballer (born 1978)

Personal information
- Full name: N'Dayi Fanfan Kalenga
- Date of birth: 29 September 1978 (age 48)
- Place of birth: Kamina, Zaire
- Height: 1.74 m (5 ft 9 in)
- Position: Striker

Senior career*
Years	Team	Apps	(Gls)
1994–1996	SCOM Mikishi		
1996–1997	OC Mbongo Sport		
1998	Kayserispor	13	(3)
1998–1999	Karabükspor	10	(2)
1999	Cheonan Ilhwa Chunma	7	(0)
2000–2001	Küçük Kaymaklı Türk		
2001	Pogoń Szczecin	3	(0)
2001–2002	Küçük Kaymaklı Türk		
2002	Göztepe	3	(0)
2003	Küçük Kaymaklı Türk		
2003	Yenicami Ağdelen		
2003–2005	Għajnsielem	33	(32)
2005–2006	Xagħra United		
2007	Oman Club		
2008	Mosta		
2008–2009	Għajnsielem	5	(1)
2010	Msida Saint-Joseph	5	(3)
2010	Għajnsielem		
- * Club domestic league appearances and goals

N'Dayi Kalenga (born 29 September 1978) is a Congolese former professional footballer who played as a striker. He has previously played for several Maltese clubs, including Mosta.

== Honours ==
Għajnsielem

- Gozo Football League: 2004–05
