= Ayrton Azzopardi =

Maltese footballer

Personal information
- Date of birth: 12 September 1993 (age 33)
- Place of birth: Pietà, Malta
- Height: 1.80 m (5 ft 11 in)
- Position: Defensive midfielder

Senior career*
Years	Team	Apps	(Gls)
2009–2014	Hibernians	22	(0)
2014	Msida St. Joseph		
2014–2015	Pembroke Athleta		
2015–2018	Tarxien Rainbows	62	(12)
2018	→ Sliema Wanderers (loan)	1	(0)
2018–2019	Sliema Wanderers	2	(0)
2019–2020	Tarxien Rainbows	9	(0)
2020–2021	Floriana	3	(0)
2021–2022	San Ġwann	6	(4)
2022–2023	Gudja United	5	(1)
2023–2024	Attard	6	(0)
2024–2025	Mtarfa	15	(1)
2025–2026	Qormi		

International career
2012	Malta	1	(0)
- * Club domestic league appearances and goals as of 11:34, 7 August 2026 (UTC)

Ayrton Azzopardi (born 12 September 1993) is a Maltese international footballer who plays as a defensive midfielder.

== Career ==
Born in Pietà, Azzopardi has played club football for Hibernians, Msida Saint-Joseph, Pembroke Athleta, Tarxien Rainbows, Sliema Wanderers, Floriana, San Ġwann, Gudja United, Attard, Mtarfa and Qormi.

He made one international appearance for Malta in 2012.
