= Maltese First Division knock-out =

Football competition in Malta

The First Division Knock-Out was a football competition contested by teams playing in the Maltese First Division. The competition was introduced for the 2006–07 season. There were four teams who compete in a preliminary round, with the two winners advancing to the quarter-finals with six other teams. The competition was continued in a knockout fashion.

== Winners ==
| Season | Winners | Score | Runners–up |
|---|---|---|---|
| 2006–07 | Tarxien Rainbows | 2–1 | Mosta |
| 2007–08 | Dingli Swallows | 3–1 | Vittoriosa Stars |
| 2008–09 | St. Patrick | 2–0 | Dingli Swallows |
| 2009–10 | Marsaxlokk | 1–0 | St. George's |
| 2010–11 | Dingli Swallows | 3–2 | Balzan Youths |
