= 2008–09 Maltese First Division knock-out =

2008–09 First Division Knock-Out
Tournament details
- Country: Malta
- Dates: 13 September 2008 – 10 May 2009
- Teams: 10

Final positions
- Champions: St. Patrick
- Runners-up: Dingli Swallows

Tournament statistics
- Matches played: 23
- Goals scored: 62 (2.7 per match)

The 2008–09 Maltese First Division Knock-Out was a knockout tournament for Maltese football clubs playing in the First Division. This year's format differs from the previous 2 years in that the simple knock-out has been replaced by two groups, the top two from each qualifying for the semi-finals. The competition started on 13 September 2008 and finished on 10 May 2009, with the final. The final was contested between the First Division champions Dingli Swallows and St. Patrick. St. Patrick won 2-0.

== Group stage ==
=== Group 1 ===
Pos	Team	Pld	W	D	L	GF	GA	GD	Pts	Qualification	DIN	PIE	MQA	RAB	VIT
1	Dingli Swallows	4	3	1	0	5	1	+4	10	Advance to knockout phase	—	0–0	2–1	2–0	1–0
2	Pietà Hotspurs	4	2	2	0	4	1	+3	8	Advance to knockout phase		—	1–0	0–0	3–1
3	Mqabba	4	2	0	2	7	6	+1	6				—	3–1	3–2
4	Rabat Ajax	4	0	2	2	2	6	−4	2					—	1–1
5	Vittoriosa Stars	4	0	1	3	4	8	−4	1						—

Source: MaltaFootball.com

=== Group 2 ===
Pos	Team	Pld	W	D	L	GF	GA	GD	Pts	Qualification	STP	MOS	STG	SEN	SĠW
1	St. Patrick	4	3	0	1	12	2	+10	9	Advance to knockout phase	—	0–1	4–0	4–0	4–1
2	Mosta	4	2	2	0	5	3	+2	8	Advance to knockout phase		—	1–1	1–1	2–1
3	St. George's	4	1	2	1	4	6	−2	5				—	2–0	1–1
4	Senglea Athletic	4	1	1	2	3	8	−5	4					—	2–1
5	San Ġwann	4	0	1	3	4	9	−5	1						—

Source: MaltaFootball.com

== Knockout phase ==
=== Semi-finals ===
Team 1	Score	Team 2
23 May 2009
Dingli Swallows	5–1	Mosta
Pieta Hotspurs	1–3 (a.e.t.)	St. Patrick

=== Final ===
Team 1	Score	Team 2
31 May 2009
Dingli Swallows	0–2	St. Patrick

== See also ==
- 2008–09 Maltese First Division
