= 2009–10 Maltese First Division knock-out =

2009–10 First Division Knock-Out
Tournament details
- Country: Malta
- Dates: 20 September 2009 – 14 May 2010
- Teams: 10

Final positions
- Champions: Marsaxlokk
- Runners-up: St. George's

Tournament statistics
- Matches played: 23
- Goals scored: 83 (3.61 per match)

The 2009–10 Maltese First Division Knock-Out was a knockout tournament for Maltese football clubs playing in the First Division. The competition was held between 20 September 2009 and 14 May 2010, with the winners being Marsaxlokk.

== Group stage ==
=== Group 1 ===
Pos	Team	Pld	W	D	L	GF	GA	GD	Pts	Qualification	MAR	STP	MOS	SĠW	MEL
1	Marsaxlokk	4	4	0	0	15	3	+12	12	Advance to knockout phase	—	1–0	4–1	6–0	4–2
2	St. Patrick	4	2	1	1	8	4	+4	7	Advance to knockout phase		—	3–1	1–1	4–1
3	Mosta	4	2	0	2	10	9	+1	6				—	4–0	4–1
4	San Ġwann	4	0	2	2	3	13	−10	2					—	2–2
5	Melita	4	0	1	3	7	14	−7	1						—

Source: MaltaFootball.com

=== Group 2 ===
Pos	Team	Pld	W	D	L	GF	GA	GD	Pts	Qualification	STG	MQA	PIE	BAL	VIT
1	St. George's	4	3	0	1	12	4	+8	9	Advance to knockout phase	—	3–0	6–1	3–2	0–1
2	Mqabba	4	2	1	1	4	5	−1	7	Advance to knockout phase		—	1–1	2–1	1–0
3	Pietà Hotspurs	4	1	2	1	6	9	−3	5				—	1–1	3–1
4	Balzan Youths	4	1	1	2	8	7	+1	4					—	4–1
5	Vittoriosa Stars	4	1	0	3	3	8	−5	3						—

Source: MaltaFootball.com

== Knockout phase ==
=== Semi-finals ===
Team 1	Score	Team 2
8 May 2010
Marsaxlokk	4–0	Mqabba
St. Patrick	1–2	St. George's

=== Final ===
Team 1	Score	Team 2
14 May 2010
Marsaxlokk	1–0	St. George's

== See also ==
- 2009–10 Maltese First Division
