= Ivan Zammit =

Maltese footballer

Personal information
- Full name: Ivan Zammit
- Date of birth: 17 March 1972 (age 54)
- Place of birth: Valletta, Malta
- Position: Defender

Team information
- Current team: Lija Athletic

Senior career*
| Years | Team | Apps | (Gls) |
| 1988–1989 | Valletta | 12 | (1) |
| 1989 | Żurrieq | 4 | (0) |
| 1989–1990 | Floriana | 11 | (0) |
| 1990–1993 | Ħamrun Spartans | 45 | (4) |
| 1993–1997 | Valletta | 70 | (10) |
| 1997–2000 | Birkirkara | 69 | (26) |
| 2000–2004 | Valletta | 74 | (35) |
| 2004–2005 | Marsaxlokk | 25 | (3) |
| 2005–2006 | Ħamrun Spartans | 14 | (2) |
| 2006–2008 | Vittoriosa Stars | | |
| 2008–2012 | Balzan | | |

International career^{‡}
| | Malta U21 | 4 | (0) |
| 1995–1999 | Malta | 21 | (0) |

Managerial career
- 2015: Mosta
- 2016: Mosta
- 2024: Attard
- 2025: Lija A.
- 2026: Zejtun C.
- * Club domestic league appearances and goals as of 11 December 2009 ‡ National team caps and goals as of 11 December 2009

Ivan Zammit (born 17 March 1972 in Valletta, Malta) is a former professional footballer, currently the head coach at National Amateur League II side Zejtun C..He is also known as Is-Sej among his friends

== International career ==
Ivan played international football for his home nation Malta. Zammit gained his first cap in a home match against Albania on 16 August 1995. During Zammit's international career from 1995 to 1999, he made 21 appearances, but failed to score any goals.
