= Alan Abela-Wadge =

Maltese politician

Councilor Alan Abela-Wadge
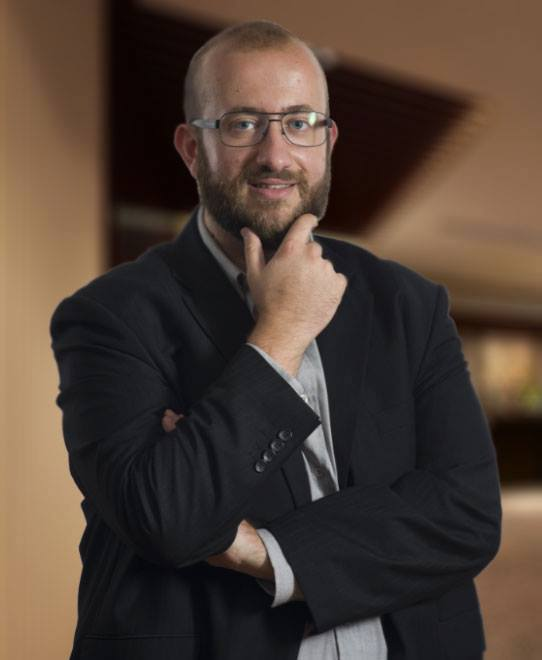
- Alan Abela-Wadge in 2015
- Constituency: Malta – 9th & 10th Districts

Personal details
- Born: 15 March 1987 (age 39) Msida, Malta
- Party: Nationalist Party
- Education: Doctorate in Business Administration
- Occupation: Politician, Business Executive
- Website: abela-wadge.com

Alan Abela-Wadge (born 15 March 1987) is a Maltese politician and former councillor on the Msida Local Council. He served as a local councillor from 2013 to 2019, representing the Nationalist Party. He is also known for publicly discussing his weight-loss journey and bariatric surgery experience.

== Career ==
Abela-Wadge started his professional career in banking after graduating and worked in the sector for approximately 12 years. He later transitioned into sales and management and currently serves as a General Manager with a local company. He also holds a directorship in a family-owned business.

=== Football ===
Abela-Wadge was a committee member with Msida Saint-Joseph F.C. for 10 years, where he held various positions including Financial Director and President before resigning in 2015.

=== Politics ===
Abela-Wadge contested the local election in Msida in 2013 as a candidate for the Nationalist Party and was elected councillor. He was assigned the portfolio of Sports and Youths.

In the same year, he was elected as an executive member of the KKLPN. On 15 September 2014, he was approved by the Nationalist Party as a prospective candidate for the Maltese general election.

In July 2015, he was elected President of the College of Local Councillors.

==== Weight-loss advocacy ====
In January 2021, Abela-Wadge underwent gastric bypass surgery after publicly discussing his struggles with obesity and weight management. Prior to the procedure, his weight was reported to be 200.1 kg. Following the surgery and lifestyle changes, his weight decreased to approximately 95 kg.

In January 2023, he underwent excess skin removal surgery as part of his continued recovery process.

Abela-Wadge has publicly discussed bariatric surgery and obesity awareness through media appearances and interviews. He has stated that bariatric surgery should not be viewed as a first solution for weight loss, but rather as an option considered after alternative methods and professional medical consultation.

== See also ==
- List of Maltese people
