= Edward Darmanin =

Maltese footballer (born 1945)

Personal information
- Date of birth: 15 November 1945 (age 80)
- Place of birth: Sliema, Malta
- Position: Defender

Senior career*
Years	Team	Apps	(Gls)
1962–1964	St. George's	16	(1)
1964–1965	Hibernians	12	(2)
1965–1977	Sliema Wanderers	159	(12)
1977–1979	Qormi	30	(1)
Total		217	(16)

International career
1969–1977	Malta	29	(0)

Managerial career
- 1979–1980: Qormi
- 1980–1985: St. Patrick
- 1985–1986: Valletta
- 1986–1987: Mqabba
- 1987–1989: Hibernians
- 1989–1990: St. Lucia
- 1990–1991: St. George's
- 1991–1993: St. Lucia
- 1993–1994: Gudja United
- 1994–1996: St. Patrick
- 1996–1997: Xgħajra Tornadoes
- 1999–2000: St. Lucia
- 2000–2001: Tarxien Rainbows
- 2001–2002: Xgħajra Tornadoes
- 2002–2003: Gudja United
- 2003–2005: St. George's
- 2005–2007: Birżebbuġa St. Peter's
- 2007–2009: Fgura United
- 2009–2010: Żejtun Corinthians
- * Club domestic league appearances and goals

Edward Darmanin (born 15 November 1945) is a Maltese football coach and former player who is the head coach of Xaghjra Tornados Youth Nursery.

During his career, Darmanin played as a defender for St. George's, Hibernians, Sliema Wanderers and Qormi. Darmanin made 28 appearances for the Malta national football team.
