= Marco Banchini =

Italian football manager

Personal information
- Date of birth: 23 September 1980 (age 46)
- Place of birth: Vigevano, Italy

Managerial career
- Years: Team
- 2000–2008: Vigevano (youth)
- 2006–2011: Vigevano (assistant)
- 2011–2012: Vigevano
- 2012–2013: Sporting Bellinzago (assistant)
- 2014: Teuta
- 2015: Amicale
- 2016: Qormi
- 2016: Laçi (assistant)
- 2016–2017: Siena (assistant)
- 2017: Casertana (assistant)
- 2018–2020: Como
- 2021–2022: Vis Pesaro
- 2022–2023: Montevarchi
- 2023: Alessandria
- 2023–2024: Alessandria
- 2024–2025: Pro Vercelli
- 2025–2026: Sanremese

Marco Banchini (born 23 September 1980) is an Italian football coach.

== Career ==
Banchini started his managerial career with Vigevano. After that, he coached Amicale. In 2018, he was appointed head coach of Como 1907 in the Italian Serie C.

On 1 December 2020, Como sacked him after the match against Piacenza.

On 24 May 2021 he was hired by Serie C club Vis Pesaro.

On 6 December 2022, Banchini returned into management as the new head coach of Serie C club Montevarchi. He was dismissed on 3 April 2023 as he failed to turn the team's fortunes, leaving Montevarchi deep in the relegation zone.

On 4 October 2023, Banchini returned to management as the new head coach of Serie C club Alessandria. He was dismissed just a month later, on 21 November, following a change of ownership within the club, only to be rehired a month later, on 28 December. After failing to improve results, Banchini was dismissed for a second time on 17 March 2024, leaving Alessandria dead last in the league table.

On 28 November 2024, Banchini returned to management as the new head coach of Serie C club Pro Vercelli, replacing outgoing manager Paolo Cannavaro.
