= Akpan David Udoh =

Nigerian footballer (born 1999)

Akpan Udoh
Personal information
- Full name: Akpan David Udoh
- Date of birth: 18 July 1999 (age 27)
- Place of birth: Ikenne, Nigeria
- Height: 1.89 m (6 ft 2 in)
- Position: Goalkeeper

Team information
- Current team: Mosta
- Number: 22

Youth career
- 2017–2018: Bnei Sakhnin U19

Senior career*
Years	Team	Apps	(Gls)
2018–2021	Beyond Limits		
2021–2022	Almagro	0	(0)
2022–2023	One Rocket		
2023	ASSC		
2023–	Mosta	84	(0)

International career^{‡}
2015	Nigeria U17	7	(0)
2019	Nigeria U20	5	(0)
2026–	Uganda	1	(0)
Medal record
FIFA U-17 World Cup
Gold medal – first place	2015 Chile
- * Club domestic league appearances and goals as of 17 September 2026 ‡ National team caps and goals as of 5 October 2026

Akpan David Udoh (born 18 July 1999) is a professional footballer who plays as a goalkeeper for Maltese Premier League club Mosta. Born in Nigeria, he plays for the Uganda national team.

He represented Nigeria at under-17 and under-20 level. He was a member of the Nigeria team that won the 2015 FIFA U-17 World Cup in Chile.

== Early life and career ==
Udoh was born on 18 July 1999 in Ikenne, Ogun State, Nigeria but hails from Akwa Ibom State. He began playing football while in primary school. Soon after, started his with Remo Football Academy Under-13 as a goalkeeper while living in Ijebu-Remo. He joined the Nigeria Golden Eaglets setup.

In 2017, Udoh moved to Israel and joined Bnei Sakhnin. He signed a three-year contract and initially played for the B team. In November 2017, he made his senior debut for the club in a 0–0 draw against Hapoel Be'er Sheva.

== Club career ==
After leaving Israel, Udoh continued his career in Spain. In December 31, 2020, Udoh joined Spanish club Almagro CF. And remained with the team until December 2021, He returned to Nigeria to sign with domestic side One Rocket before joining Abeokuta Stormers SC in the Nigeria National League. In August 2023, he moved to Malta to join Mosta and signed a one-year contract.

=== Mosta ===
Udoh made his first appearances for Mosta during the 2023–24 season making 23 league appearances for Mosta and kept nine clean sheets. He became the club's regular goalkeeper during the early part of the season. In November 2023, and was selected in the Malta Football Players Association's team of the week following his performances for Mosta.

On 5 November 2023, Udoh started in Mosta's 1–1 draw away to Ħamrun Spartans. He made several saves during the match as Mosta ended the game with a point. He made a further 24 league appearances during the 2024–25 season.

In April 2025, Udoh was named Maltese Premier League Player of the Month.

== International career ==
Since Federation of Uganda Football Associations maintains that one of Udoh's grandparents was born in Busia, he made his debut for the Uganda national team on 2 October 2026.

== Honours ==
Nigeria U17

- FIFA U-17 World Cup: 2015

Individual

- Malta Football Players Association Team of the week: 2023
- Maltese Premier League Player of the Month: 2025
