= Jesmond Zerafa =

Maltese footballer

Personal information
- Full name: Jesmond Zerafa
- Date of birth: 3 August 1965 (age 61)
- Place of birth: Valletta, Malta
- Position: Striker

Team information
- Current team: Valletta (TD)

Senior career*
Years	Team	Apps	(Gls)
1982-1983	Valletta	7	(0)
1983-1984	Senglea Athletic	5	(0)
1984-1985	St. George's	14	(1)
1985-1986	Tarxien Rainbows	14	(3)
1986-1995	Valletta	130	(26)
1995-1996	Birkirkara Luxol	13	(2)
Total		183	(32)

International career
1989–1993	Malta	21	(1)

Managerial career
- 2007–2010: Qormi
- 2010–2012: Valletta
- 2012–2013: Qormi
- 2013–2014: Balzan
- 2014–2015: Naxxar Lions
- 2015: Qormi
- 2016–2017: Tarxien Rainbows
- 2019: Gżira United
- 2020: Valletta
- * Club domestic league appearances and goals

Jesmond Zerafa (born 3 August 1965, in Malta) is a retired footballer and currently technical director at howetown cub Valletta. During his playing career, he played primarily as a striker.

== International career ==
Zerafa made his debut for Malta in an October 1989 friendly match against Austria, coming on as a 46th-minute substitute for Jesmond Delia, and earned a total of 21 caps, scoring 1 goal. His final international was a June 1993 World Cup qualification match away against Portugal.

=== International goals ===
Scores and results list Malta's goal tally first.

No	Date	Venue	Opponent	Score	Result	Competition
1.	10 February 1992	Ta' Qali National Stadium, Ta' Qali, Malta	Iceland	1–0	1–0	1992 Rothmans Tournament

== Manager career ==
=== Qormi ===
Zerafa joined the Maltese First Division side Qormi in the summer of 2007. The move was an instant success, as he led the club to a 3rd-place finish in the Maltese First Division. However, as the club had finished equal on points with 2nd placed Mosta, a decider was necessary to determine which team would earn promotion to the Maltese Premier League. Qormi came out on top, beating Mosta on penalties.

The 2008–09 season saw Zerafa make a major reshuffle in the Qormi playing staff, opting to go for experience, with the hope of remaining in the Maltese Premier League. The season long loan of Sliema Wanderers midfielder Joseph Farrugia was renewed for another season. The club also added Massimo Grima and Keith Fenech, who joined from Valletta on season long loan deals, as did Marsaxlokk duo Reuben Gauci and Shawn Tellus. The club also made the permanent signings of Chucks Nwoko from Sliema Wanderers and Roderick Sammut from Birkirkara. Qormi spent the best part of the season languishing above the relegation zone, Zerafa added to the ranks with the signing of Marsaxlokk defender Stephen Wellman. The gamble paid off for Jesmond, as Qormi retained the Maltese Premier League status after finishing in 7th position.

Jesmond led Qormi into the 2009–10 season, again making some shrewd acquisitions along the way, Joseph Farrugia's loan move was made permanent, and again Valletta duo Massimo Grima and Keith Fenech's season long loan deals were extended for another season. Zerafa also signed Brazilian striker Camilo, Qormi were the surprise package of the season, exceeding expectations and even sitting top the division for some of the season. Jesmond's reign came to an end on 28 April 2010, when the club decided to release Zerafa following a breakdown in contract negotiations. Jesmond was rumored to not be willing to commit himself on a new contract for next season, and it is rumored that he will join his former club Valletta for the 2010–11 season. He had a third spell at the club in 2015, but left them citing personal reasons.

=== Valletta F.C. ===
On 29 May 2010 he signed a deal with Valletta F.C., to become the team's new manager.

=== Naxxar Lions and Tarxien Rainbows ===
Zerafa took charge of Naxxar Lions in October 2014 after the club released Winston Muscat. In December 2016 he took the helm at Tarxien Rainbows, only to resign in April 2017.

=== Gzira United ===
On 11 February 2019 Zerafa replaced Darren Abdilla as manager of Gżira United. After reaching the third place in the league, he terminated his contract, being replaced by Giovanni Tedesco.

=== Second spell at Valletta FC ===
In June 2020 Zerafa agreed to sign a two-years contract with Valletta, coming back to the club where he spent the most part of his playing career and where he had a first spell between 2010 and 2012. His second spell at the helm of his former club only lasted a few months, and Zerafa resigned in November 2020.

== Honours ==
as a player

- Maltese Premier League: 2

1990, 1992

- FA Trophy: 1

1991
