= Peter Smith (English footballer, born 1980) =

English footballer

Personal information
- Date of birth: 31 October 1980 (age 46)
- Place of birth: Skelmersdale, England
- Position: Midfielder

Youth career
- Preston North End

Senior career*
Years	Team	Apps	(Gls)
1998–2000	Exeter City	8	(0)
2000	→ Cambridge City		
2000–2002	Bamber Bridge		
2002–2003	Buckingham Town		
2008	Caernarfon Town		

Managerial career
- 2013–2014: Floriana (assistant manager)
- 2014–2015: Mosta
- * Club domestic league appearances and goals as of 23:00, 4 November 2013 (UTC)

Peter Smith (born 31 October 1980) is an English former footballer, who played for Exeter City as a midfielder, and is currently assistant manager of Floriana. Peter has also had a spell playing in Finland for Rhiamaki Rips, represented England FA and coached at Liverpool FC Academy.
