= Michael Ghebru =

German-Ethiopian footballer

Personal information
- Full name: Michael Ghebru
- Date of birth: 7 November 1987 (age 38)
- Place of birth: Germany
- Height: 5 ft 7 in (1.70 m)
- Position: Striker

Team information
- Current team: Floriana
- Number: 20

Youth career
- 1999–2004: Eintracht Frankfurt

Senior career*
| Years | Team | Apps | (Gls) |
| 2004–2005 | MSV Duisburg | 0 | (0) |
| 2006–2008 | Kickers Offenbach | | |
| 2008 | San Jose Earthquakes | 0 | (0) |
| 2009 | Ventura County Fusion | 6 | (0) |
| 2009 | Real Maryland Monarchs | 8 | (0) |
| 2010– | Floriana | 4 | (2) |

International career^{‡}
| 2007– | Ethiopia | 2 | (0) |
- * Club domestic league appearances and goals as of 27 March 2010 ‡ National team caps and goals as of 8 March 2010

Michael Ghebru (Amharic: ሚችሃአል ጝሀብሩ, born 7 November 1987 in Germany) is a German-Ethiopian professional footballer. He currently plays as a striker for the Maltese Premier League side Floriana.

== Career ==
=== Youth ===
Ghebru began his career at the youth academy of the storied German team Eintracht Frankfurt when he was 13, and played with the squad until he was 18 years old. With Eintracht's U-17 team, he reached the final of the German U-17 Championship, eventually losing to VfB Stuttgart.

=== Professional ===
Ghebru turned professional in 2004 when he signed a contract with MSV Duisburg of the 2. Fußball-Bundesliga. He played for Duisburg's U-23 team, and trained with the senior squad, but never made a full appearance, and moved on to Kickers Offenbach in 2006.

In August 2008, Ghebru was signed by the San Jose Earthquakes of Major League Soccer along with Davide Somma, and was a standout as forward on the left or right sides. He also played striker and attacking midfield.

After a brief stint playing with Ventura County Fusion in the USL Premier Development League, Ghebru won a National PDL North American Championship and then signed with the Real Maryland Monarchs in the USL Second Division in the summer of 2009.

In March 2010, Michael joined Maltese Premier League side Floriana. He scored his first goal for the Greens' on 20 March 2010 in 3–0 win over Dingli and followed up on that with another goal, scored in extra-time in the next match, the semi-final of the 100 Years National League Cup against Mosta 3-1 (A.E.T).

=== International ===
Ghebru, whose parents are Ethiopian, was called up to the Ethiopia national football team in 2007, and took part in two friendly games in Addis Abeba against Kenya and Sudan.
