= Anse Ngoubi Demba =

Gabonese footballer (born 2000)

Personal information
- Full name: Anse Jörgen Ngoubi Demba
- Date of birth: 31 January 2000 (age 26)
- Place of birth: Port-Gentil, Gabon
- Height: 1.90 m (6 ft 3 in)
- Position: Goalkeeper

Team information
- Current team: Mosta
- Number: 1

Youth career
- Amiens
- 2022–2023: Raon-l'Étape

Senior career*
Years	Team	Apps	(Gls)
2023–2025	Raon-l'Étape	12	(0)
2025–	Mosta	9	(0)

International career^{‡}
2023–	Gabon	3	(0)
- * Club domestic league appearances and goals as of 18 May 2026 ‡ National team caps and goals as of 23:55, 21 December 2025 (UTC)

Anse Jörgen Ngoubi Demba (born 31 January 2000) is a Gabonese professional footballer who plays as a goalkeeper for Maltese Premier League club Mosta and the Gabon team.

== Club career ==
A youth product of the French club Amiens, Ngoubi moved to Raon-l'Étape in 2022. On 15 June 2024, he extended his contract with Raon-l'Étape after debuting in the Championnat National 3. On 17 January 2025, he transferred to the Maltese Premier League club Mosta on a 6-month contract. On 31 July 2025, he extended his contract with Monsa until 2026

== International career ==
Ngoubi was first called up to the Gabon national team for a set of 2026 FIFA World Cup qualification matches on 7 November 2023. He made the final squad for the 2025 Africa Cup of Nations.
