= Abubakar Bello-Osagie =

Nigerian footballer (born 1988)

Abu
Personal information
- Full name: Abubakar Bello-Osagie
- Date of birth: 11 August 1988 (age 38)
- Place of birth: Benin City, Nigeria
- Height: 1.84 m (6 ft 0 in)
- Position: Forward

Youth career
- –2005: Bendel Insurance

Senior career*
Years	Team	Apps	(Gls)
2005–2006	River Plate	5	(1)
2006–2007	Internacional	4	(1)
2008	Vasco da Gama	4	(0)
2009–2010	Caxias	9	(2)
2010–2013	Qormi	63	(20)
2013	→ Valletta (loan)	9	(5)
2013–2014	Sliema Wanderers	13	(3)
2014–2015	Victoria Hotspurs		
2015	Pembroke Athleta	11	(6)
2015–2016	Senglea Athletic	11	(1)
2016–2019	Lija Athletic	55	(17)
2020	Naxxar Lions	6	(3)
2020–2022	Marsaskala	12	(7)
- * Club domestic league appearances and goals as of 18:42, 27 February 2023 (UTC)

Abubakar Bello-Osagie (born 11 August 1988), commonly known as Abubakar or Abu, is a Nigerian professional footballer who plays as a striker, most recently for Marsaskala in Malta.

== Career ==
Born in Benin City, Edo State, in 2005, he left Bendel Insurance of his home city of Benin, and joined River Plate in Argentina.

Bello-Osagie joined Rio de Janeiro-based club Vasco in December 2007, after being scouted by the former footballer Bismarck. On 17 July 2008, he stayed on the bench for the first time, against Goiás, playing his first professional league match as a Vasco player on 20 July 2008, when his club was defeated by Atlético-PR 3–1 at Arena da Baixada, Curitiba, for the Campeonato Brasileiro Série A. He played four Série A matches in 2008, without scoring a goal. Abu signed on 29 April 2009 for Caxias.

In the summer of 2010, Abu signed for Qormi in the Maltese Premier Division, where he enjoyed a very successful spell and achieved several accolades, such as 'Player of the Month'. He played for various clubs in Malta from 2010, before leaving Marsaskala in 2022.
