= Roderick Bajada =

Maltese footballer

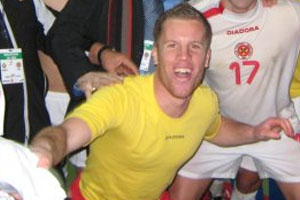

Personal information
- Full name: Roderick Bajada
- Date of birth: 4 January 1983 (age 43)
- Place of birth: Ħamrun, Malta
- Position: Midfielder

Senior career*
Years	Team	Apps	(Gls)
2001–2004	Hamrun Spartans	72	(4)
2004–2006	Msida Saint-Joseph	30	(6)
2006–2012	Sliema Wanderers	90	(10)
2009–2010	→ Marsaxlokk (loan)	0	(0)
2012	→ Valletta (loan)	8	(0)
2012–2013	Tarxien Rainbows	25	(3)
2013–2014	Qormi	25	(1)
2014–2016	Pembroke Athleta	51	(5)
2015–2016	→ Tarxien Rainbows (loan)	12	(0)
2016–2019	Żebbuġ Rangers		

International career
- Malta U16
- Malta U19
	Malta U21	23	(1)
2004–2008	Malta	10	(0)
- * Club domestic league appearances and goals

Roderick Bajada (born 4 January 1983 in Ħamrun, Malta) is a retired professional footballer who played as a midfielder.

== Playing career ==
=== Ħamrun Spartans ===
Roderick began his career playing for his hometown club of Hamrun Spartans during the 2000–01 season. During his debut season, Bajada made six appearances, but failed to score, as Hamrun Spartans finished in 6th position in the Maltese Premier League.

Bajada went into the 2001–02 season and established himself as first team regular in the Hamrun Spartans squad. He helped the team to another 6th-place finish in the Maltese Premier League, making 19 appearances but again failing to find the net.

The 2002–03 season was Roderick's third season with Hamrun Spartans, the club slipped into the relegation pool, but managed to finish the season in 7th position, with Bajada making 24 appearances and scoring two goals.

Roderick's last season with Hamrun Spartans was the 2003–04 season. He 23 appearances and scored two goals, but unfortunately Hamrun Spartans finished rock bottom of the Premier League in 10th position, and were condemned to relegation to the Maltese First Division.

=== Msida Saint-Joseph ===
Following the relegation of Hamrun Spartans, Bajada joined Msida Saint-Joseph for the 2004–05 season. He helped his new club narrowly avoid relegation with an 8th-place finish in the Premier League that season, making 18 appearances and scoring two goals.

The 2005–06 was Roderick's second season with Msida Saint-Joseph, it also turned out to be his final season with the club, as he left during the January transfer window of 2006, he made 12 appearances, scoring four goals. Msida Saint-Joseph went on to 6th finish the season in position in the Premier League that season.

=== Sliema Wanderers ===
Roderick Bajada joined Sliema Wanderers from Msida Saint-Joseph for the second part of the 2005–06 season. It was almost the perfect finish to a season, but the club narrowly missed out on the title to Birkirkara by two points, as the club finished in 2nd position. Bajada made 13 appearances and scored one goal.

Roderick's first full season with Sliema Wanderers was the 2006–07 season. Sliema Wanderers recorded another 2nd-place finish, but were well beaten in the race for the title as winners Marsaxlokk finished 11 points clear of their nearest rivals, Bajada made 26 appearances and scored four goals throughout the season.

For the 2007–08 season, Roderick again made the first team on a regular basis, as Sliema Wanderers finished in a disappointing 4th place by their own high standards, and Bajada again making 26 appearances and scoring four goals.

Roderick continued to be an integral part of the Sliema Wanderers squad. Bajada made a total of 25 appearances and scored one goal for the 2008–09 season, and although the team finished 5th in the Premier League, Roderick helped the club win the U*Bet FA Trophy, as they defeated Valletta in the final on penalties to win the trophy.

After being scouted by an unknown young football talent for a school project at the end of 2011 including Floriana, Marsasxlokk and Mqabba, he continued to impressively score goals for Sliema in order to preserve their mid table battles.

=== Marsaxlokk ===
During the close season Sliema Wanderers signed Clayton Failla and Ryan Fenech, leaving Bajada's first team opportunities limited, he decided to join Marsaxlokk on a season long loan, his new club were due to start this season in the Premier League, however following a guilty verdict on corruption case from the previous season, Marsaxlokk were demoted to the Maltese First Division. Roderick carried on the 2009–10 season in the First Division with his new club.

=== Valletta ===
In January he joined Valletta on a loan from Sliema Wanderers. He also became a Physics Teacher at Zokrija School.

=== Tarxien Rainbows ===
On 27 August 2012, he joined Tarxien Rainbows on a free transfer.

== Honours ==
=== Sliema Wanderers ===
- 2009 Maltese Cup

=== Marsaxlokk ===
- 2009/10 Maltese First Division

== Career statistics ==
Statistics accurate as of match played 1 August 2009.

Club performance			League		Cup		League Cup		Continental		Total	
Season	Club	League	Apps	Goals	Apps	Goals	Apps	Goals	Apps	Goals	Apps	Goals
Malta			League		Maltese Cup		League Cup		Europe		Total	
2000–01	Hamrun Spartans	Maltese Premier League	6	0	0	0	0	0	0	0	6	0
2001–02	Hamrun Spartans	Maltese Premier League	19	4	0	0	0	0	0	0	19	0
2002–03	Hamrun Spartans	Maltese Premier League	24	2	0	0	0	0	0	0	24	2
2003–04	Hamrun Spartans	Maltese Premier League	23	2	0	0	0	0	0	0	23	2
2004–05	Msida Saint-Joseph	Maltese Premier League	18	2	0	0	0	0	0	0	18	2
2005–06	Msida Saint-Joseph	Maltese Premier League	12	4	0	0	0	0	0	0	12	4
2005–06	Sliema Wanderers	Maltese Premier League	13	1	0	0	0	0	0	0	13	1
2006–07	Sliema Wanderers	Maltese Premier League	26	4	0	0	0	0	0	0	26	4
2007–08	Sliema Wanderers	Maltese Premier League	26	4	0	0	0	0	0	0	26	4
2008–09	Sliema Wanderers	Maltese Premier League	25	1	0	0	0	0	0	0	25	1
2009–10	Marsaxlokk (loan)	Maltese First Division	0	0	0	0	0	0	0	0	0	0
Total	Malta		192	20	0	0	0	0	0	0	192	20
Career total			192	20	0	0	0	0	0	0	192	20
