= Josue (footballer, born 1987) =

Brazilian footballer

Personal information
- Full name: Josué Souza Santos
- Date of birth: July 10, 1987 (age 39)
- Place of birth: Sertãozinho, Brazil
- Height: 1.70 m (5 ft 7 in)
- Position: Striker

Youth career
- 2004–2006: Shibuya Makuhari High School

Senior career*
| Years | Team | Apps | (Gls) |
| 2007–2009 | Sagan Tosu | 7 | (0) |
| 2008 | → Machida Zelvia (loan) | 4 | (1) |
| 2010–2011 | Anagennisi Karditsa | 4 | (0) |
| 2011–2012 | Qormi | 12 | (6) |
| 2012–2013 | San Carlos | 20 | (1) |
| 2013 | Inter de Limeira | 8 | (0) |
| 2014 | Guarani-MG | 4 | (0) |
| 2014 | Ríver | 4 | (0) |
| 2015 | Taubaté | 8 | (0) |
| 2016 | Comercial | 9 | (0) |
- * Club domestic league appearances and goals

Josué Souza Santos, or simply Josue (born July 10, 1987), is a Brazilian footballer who played as a striker.

== Club statistics ==
| Club performance | | | League | | Cup | | Total | |
| Season | Club | League | Apps | Goals | Apps | Goals | Apps | Goals |
| Japan | | | League | | Emperor's Cup | | Total | |
|---|---|---|---|---|---|---|---|---|
| 2007 | Sagan Tosu | J2 League | 3 | 0 | 1 | 0 | 4 | 0 |
| 2008 | FC Machida Zelvia | Regional Leagues | 4 | 1 | - | | 4 | 1 |
| 2009 | Sagan Tosu | J2 League | 4 | 0 | 0 | 0 | 4 | 0 |
| Country | Japan | | 11 | 1 | 1 | 0 | 12 | 1 |
| Total | | | 11 | 1 | 1 | 0 | 12 | 1 |
