= Kosta Bjedov =

Serbian footballer

Personal information
- Full name: Kosta Bjedov
- Date of birth: 10 May 1986 (age 40)
- Place of birth: Knin, SFR Yugoslavia
- Height: 1.94 m (6 ft 4 1/2 in)
- Position: Striker

Youth career
- 2000–2002: Rad
- 2002–2004: Železnik

Senior career*
Years	Team	Apps	(Gls)
2004–2006	Polet Mirosaljci		
2006–2008	Košice	17	(3)
2008	Sliema Wanderers	6	(3)
2008	Arsenal Tivat	9	(1)
2009	Radnički Obrenovac	3	(0)
2009	Košice B		
2010	Shanghai East Asia	5	(0)
2010	Qormi	10	(1)
2010–2011	Čukarički	0	(0)
- * Club domestic league appearances and goals

Kosta Bjedov (Serbian Cyrillic: Коста Бједов; born 10 May 1986) is a Serbian retired footballer who last played for Čukarički. He is currently sports director at the Serbian club FK Radnicki Zrenjanin.
