= List of French football transfers summer 2014 =

This is a list of French football transfers in the 2014 summer transfer window.

Date	Name	Moving from	Moving to	Fee	Note
May 5, 2014	(France) Yunis Abdelhamid	(France) AC Arles-Avignon	(France) US Luzenac	Undisclosed	
May 8, 2014	(France) Ludovic Butelle	(France) AC Arles-Avignon	(France) SCO Angers	Undisclosed	
May 14, 2014	(Serbia) Aleksandar Pesic	(Serbia) FK Jagodina	(France) Toulouse FC	Undisclosed	
May 18, 2014	(Denmark) Lars Jacobsen	(Denmark) F.C. Copenhagen	(France) EA Guingamp	Undisclosed	
May 20, 2014	(Venezuela) Manuel Arteaga	(Venezuela) Zulia FC	(France) AC Arles-Avignon	Loan	
May 20, 2014	(Venezuela) Robert Hernandez	(Venezuela) Deportivo Anzoategui	(France) AC Arles-Avignon	Undisclosed	
May 20, 2014	(Venezuela) Alres Flores	(Venezuela) Zamora FC	(France) AC Arles-Avignon	Loan	
May 21, 2014	(South Korea) Kim Shin	(South Korea) Jeonbuk Hyundai	(France) Olympique Lyonnais	Loan	
May 22, 2014	(Benin) Jordan Adeoti	(France) Stade Lavallois	(France) SM Caen	Undisclosed	
May 22, 2014	(France) Hervé Bazile	(France) Poiré sur Vie	(France) SM Caen	Undisclosed	
May 23, 2014	(France) Dimitri Foulquier	(France) Stade Rennais	(Spain) Granada CF	Undisclosed	
May 23, 2014	(Brazil) David Luiz	(England) Chelsea	(France) Paris Saint-Germain	50 Million €	
May 26, 2014	(France) Damien Da Silva	(France) Clermont Foot	(France) SM Caen	Undisclosed	
May 27, 2014	(Mali) Kalifa Traoré	(France) Paris Saint-Germain	(France) SCO Angers	Undisclosed	
May 27, 2014	(France) Kevin Berigaud	(France) Evian TG	(France) Montpellier HSC	Undisclosed	
May 27, 2014	(France) Harry Novillo	(Belgium) RAEC Mons	(France) Clermont Foot	Undisclosed	
May 28, 2014	(France) Régis Gurtner	(France) US Boulogne	(France) US Luzenac	Undisclosed	
May 28, 2014	(France) Ludovic Guerriero	(France) LB Chateauroux	(France) Stade Lavallois	Undisclosed	
May 29, 2014	(France) Gaetan Belaud	(France) Stade Lavallois	(France) US Luzenac	Undisclosed	
June 16, 2014	(Argentina) Emanuel Herrera	(France) Montpellier HSC	(Ecuador) Emelec	Undisclosed	
