= Stefan Giglio =

Maltese footballer

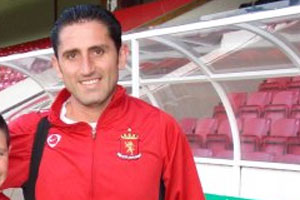

Personal information
- Full name: Stefan Giglio
- Date of birth: 26 February 1979 (age 47)
- Place of birth: Valletta, Malta
- Height: 5 ft 11 in (1.80 m)
- Position: Midfielder

Youth career
- 1988–1994: Valletta

Senior career*
Years	Team	Apps	(Gls)
1994–2000	Valletta	125	(35)
2000–2003	CSKA Sofia	23	(6)
2002–2003	→ Lokomotiv Sofia (loan)	11	(3)
2003–2007	Sliema Wanderers	79	(24)
2007–2010	Valletta	37	(4)
2010	→ Qormi (loan)	14	(2)
2010–2011	Qormi	19	(0)
2011–2012	Tarxien Rainbows	14	(0)
2012–2013	Balzan	28	(0)
2013–2015	Żurrieq	30	(2)
Total		380	(76)

International career^{‡}
- Malta U16
- Malta U18
- Malta U21
1997–2005	Malta	43	(2)
2004	Malta XI	1	(0)
- * Club domestic league appearances and goals as of 25 March 2014 ‡ National team caps and goals as of 6 September 2008

Stefan Giglio (born 26 February 1979) is a Maltese retired footballer who played as a midfielder.

Giglio has been called to play for the Malta national football team during some time or another, and also had spells in Bulgarian top flight. His preferred squad number is 26, his birthday.

== Playing career ==
=== Valletta ===
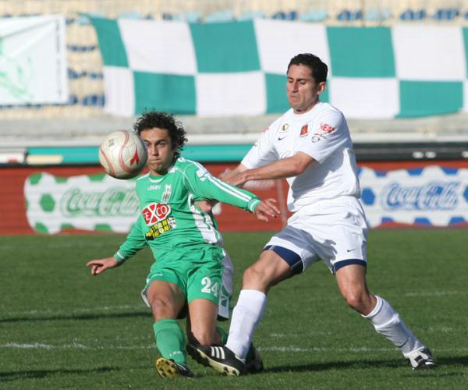
Stefan Giglio in action for Valletta.

== International career ==
Giglio made his debut for Malta in a June 1997 friendly match against Scotland and earned a total of 44 caps (1 unofficial), scoring 2 goals. His final international was a June 2005 World Cup qualification match away against Sweden.

=== International goals ===
Scores and results list. Malta's goal tally first.

#	Date	Venue	Opponent	Score	Result	Competition
1.	19 August 2003	Stade Josy Barthel, Luxembourg City, Luxembourg	Luxembourg	1–1	1–1	Friendly
2.	18 August 2004	Tórsvøllur, Thórshavn, Faroe Islands	Faroe Islands	1–2	2–3	Friendly
