= Enrico Piccioni =

Italian footballer (born 1961)

Enrico Piccioni (born 23 November 1961, in San Benedetto del Tronto) is a former Italian footballer in the role of centre back, whose last major appointment was as a manager of Bulgarian A PFG club Botev PLOVDIV. He has also been in charge of other clubs in Bulgaria such as Shumen 2010 and Mosta F.C. in Malta.
