= Ian Ciantar =

Maltese footballer

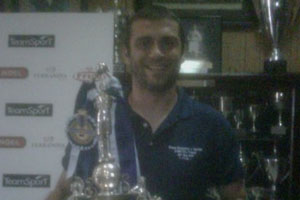

Personal information
- Full name: Ian John Ciantar
- Date of birth: 19 December 1975 (age 50)
- Place of birth: St. Julian's, Malta
- Height: 5 ft 9 in (1.75 m)
- Position: Defender

Youth career
- Sliema Wanderers

Senior career*
Years	Team	Apps	(Gls)
1995–2004	Sliema Wanderers	190	(5)
2004–2006	Floriana	24	(3)
2006–2010	Sliema Wanderers	57	(0)

International career^{‡}
- Malta U17
- Malta U19
- Malta U21
2001–2006	Malta	23	(0)
- * Club domestic league appearances and goals as of 1 July 2009 ‡ National team caps and goals as of 1 July 2009

Ian John Ciantar (born 19 December 1975 in St. Julian's, Malta) is a professional footballer who most recently played for Maltese Premier League side Sliema Wanderers, where he played as a defender.

== Personal life ==
- Ian is the older brother of Floriana defender Clifton Ciantar.
