= Pembroke Athleta F.C. =

Maltese football club

Pembroke Athleta
- Full name: Pembroke Athleta Football Club
- Founded: 1994; 32 years ago
- Ground: Pembroke Grounds; Pembroke; Malta
- Capacity: 1,000
- Chairman: Alex Calleja
- Manager: Jeffrey Mifsud
- League: National Amateur League
- 2021–22: Maltese Challenge League, Group A, 1st (relegated)

Pembroke Athleta Football Club are a Maltese football club from the town of Pembroke, which currently plays in the Maltese National Amateur League. Originally they were founded in 1962 but they competed at an amateur level. They competed in the Maltese Third Division in 1994 for the first time.

Pembroke Athleta reached the Premier League for the first time in 2015.

== History ==
Old Badge

- 1962: Founded as Athleta Juvenis
- 1994: Debuted in Maltese Third Division and renamed Pembroke Athleta F.C
- 1996: Maltese Third Division (Section B) Winners
- 1998: Maltese Third and Second Division Knock-Out Runners-Up
- 2012: Maltese Third Division Champions
- 2014: Maltese Second Division Runners Up
- 2015: Maltese First Division Champions
- 2018-2025 Club president Alex Calleja sold off most of the nursery's training pitches to a Padel commercial entity for financial gain

=== 2011–12 season ===
A game of note for the club was when Pembroke were drawn against giants Hibernians in the Maltese FA Trophy. Pembroke went into half time with a shock score of 2–2, courtesy of goals from Matthew Borg and Lydon Cilia but during the second half, the endless attacks from Hibernians proved too much and despite some very good saves from Pembroke goalkeeper Rodrick Debattista and a perfectly executed goal from Pembroke Captain Carlo Leonardi, Pembroke eventually succumbed to Hibs and the game ended with the score at 5–3. During the same season, Pembroke managed to clinch first place in the Maltese Third Division and promotion to the Maltese Second Division. They finished in 1st place after taking 63 points from 26 games.

=== 2012–13 season ===
Still led by Jacques Scerri, Pembroke prepared for their first season in the Maltese Second Division. John Roland Emeka was the club's marquee signing, with the Nigerian striker arriving from recently relegated Senglea Athletic. Other signings included Matthew Mulholland, Jonathan Vella, Michael Ellul, Kane Micallef and Nicholas Grima. Pembroke started the season in incredible form, remaining unbeaten for the first 7 games, even topping the table at one point. Things went a bit sour as the season reached December though and 3 consecutive losses without scoring cost the club.

In the end, the team finished in 7th place, a solid mid-table position having won 12, drew 7 and lost 9 of their 26 games. Throughout the season, the Greys scored a total of 42 goals and conceded 30, the best defensive record out of all the sides that did not clinch promotion. John Roland Emeka proved his worth by ending the season as the club's top scorer with 14 goals.

In the Maltese FA Trophy, Pembroke once again managed to make their way into the Third Round, beating Gozitan side Xewkija Tigers 3–2. In the Third Round, they were drawn against Premier League club Qormi FC. Qormi in the end triumphed with a score of 5–2 which was obtained in extra time. Like the previous year Pembroke had made a Premier League team (who would end the tournament as runners-up) struggle.

In the U-19 section of the club, the Youth team made history as they obtained the club's first ever promotion to Section B after finishing 1st with 34 points from 18 games.

=== 2013–14 season ===
Following the departure of Jacques Scerri to Melita F.C., Vojko Martinovic, who had successfully led the club's U-17 section to promotion to the top division (Section A), was installed as the new manager of the team. New signings for the team included Nicholas Zammit, Mauro Grioli, Mark Borg, Adrian Caruana, David Mamo, Aleksandar Ribic, Lee Grima, Roberto Vella, Dylan Mintoff and Michael Borg. Carmelo Farrugia also returned from Qormi F.C. to spend another season on loan at the club.

The season began in impressive fashion as the club remained unbeaten up until December, when it lost 1–0 to Marsaskala F.C. It eventually finished in 2nd place in the 2nd Division behind Mqabba, therefore gaining a historic promotion to the Maltese First Division for the first time in the club's history. Nicholas Zammit finished the season as the club's top scorer with 13 goals.

The Youths Team was more successful through the season as it managed a promotion to the top of the Youth pyramid. This meant that within four seasons, the U-19 Team had won its way from Section D all the way to Section A. Even more incredibly, the team managed to dispatch some of the youth teams on the island including Hibernians F.C., Mosta F.C., Ħamrun Spartans F.C. and Sliema Wanderers to win the Youth Knock-Out Competition. The 1–0 victory against Sliema in the final made the team the first in the club's history to win the Trophy and also the first Section B team to triumph in this competition.

=== 2014–15 season ===
The new season saw the return of an old face, as Jacques Scerri returned to the club with Greg Degabriele, Kenneth Portelli and later on in the season, Mario Muscat as part of the technical staff. With the new staff came a host of new players namely Roderick Bajada, Ayrton Azzopardi, Ariel Laudisi, Andrea Cassar, Ousmane Sidibe, Carlo Mamo, Lucky Omerou and Abubaker Bello Osagie among others who joined long term club players such as Geoffrey Spiteri and Matthew Calleja Cremona.

== Futsal ==
Pembroke Athleta F.C. fielded a futsal team that competed in the Maltese Futsal League until 2014, when they finished 5th out of 15 clubs, narrowly missing the Play-off.

=== Youth Team ===
On 26 May, Pembroke Athleta reached the final of the MFA Youth Futsal Challenger Cup, where they were defeated 4–3 by Marsaskala Legends.

== Honours ==
- Maltese First Division
  - Champions (1): 2014–15
- Maltese Third Division
  - Champions (1): 2011–12
- Youth Knock-Out Trophy
  - Winners (1): 2013–14
- Noel Muscat Cup
  - Winners (1): 2012

== Current squad ==
As of 14 April 2025

Note: Flags indicate national team as defined under FIFA eligibility rules; some limited exceptions apply. Players may hold more than one non-FIFA nationality.

No.	Pos.	Nation	Player
1	GK	MLT	Brylan Tabone
2	DF	MLT	Immy Micallef
4	DF	MLT	Kyle Sciberras Balbi
5	DF	MLT	Kurt Farrugia
6	MF	MLT	Nathan Mizzi
7	MF	MLT	Jordan Vella
8	MF	MLT	Luke Taliana
9	FW	MLT	Kyle Cassar
10	FW	BRA	Weverton Gomes
11	MF	MLT	Maverick Cassar
12	GK	MLT	Dean Sciberras
13	MF	COL	John Montano

No.	Pos.	Nation	Player
14	DF	MLT	Xylon Marmara
15	FW	MLT	Lydon Sammut
15	MF	BRA	Joao Ricardo Oliveira
16	DF	MLT	Jacob Carabott
18	MF	MLT	Andrew Joseph Sant
19	DF	MLT	Luca Emanuele Caruana
23	MF	MLT	Roderick Taliana
28	MF	MLT	Jayden Fenech
31	FW	MLT	Robert Ciantar
71	DF	MLT	Ishmael Fenech
77	MF	MLT	Jamie Camilleri
94	GK	MLT	Daniel Camilleri
