= Msida Saint-Joseph F.C. =

Maltese football club

Msida St. Joseph F.C.
- Full name: Msida Saint-Joseph Football Club
- Nicknames: The Reds, The Saints
- Founded: 1906; 120 years ago
- Ground: Ta' Qali Stadium, Ta' Qali, Malta
- Capacity: 18,000
- Chairman: Mr. Robert Farrugia
- Coach: Paul Bugeja
- League: National Amateur League
- 2021–22: National Amateur League, Group A, 5th
- Website: http://www.msidastjoseph.com/
Home colours	Away colours

Msida Saint Joseph Football Club – usually referred to as Msida St. Joseph or simply Msida– is a Maltese football club from the town of Msida, which currently plays in the Maltese National Amateur League.

== History ==
=== Early years (1906–22) ===
The origins of football in Msida stretch back to, at least, 1908. As far as we could ascertain the first team to be founded in the district was Msida United. This team played its maiden game on November 7, 1908, against the Lyceum FT, losing by four goals to nil. Msida United continued to play the occasional game of friendly football up to March 1910 when they took part in the Junior Cup competition organised by the MFA. Msida United were drawn against, St Joseph's United, another team from Msida in the semi-finals. St Joseph's United had just been founded when the two rivals met at Rinella Football Ground on March 10, 1910. Msida United won a hard-fought game 2–1. In the final however, Msida United lost 1–0 to Sliema United. In 1910, the National Football Ground was opened in Pietà. Huge crowds filled this venue, no matter which teams were playing. This prompted the owners of the ground to organise a cup competition between the best Maltese teams of the time. Msida United met Valletta United in the quarter-finals on April 9, 1910. Being primarily a youth team, the Msidians could not cope with the burly Valletta players and were beaten by four goals to nil. This defeat spelt the end of Msida United. After this game, they disappeared completely from the local football scene. In the meantime, St Joseph's United were busy enhancing their reputation with some excellent displays of fast flowing football. The star of the team was undoubtedly Salvu Troisi who was destined to become one of the greatest Maltese footballers ever. The support of the people of Msida was diverted from Msida United to St Joseph's United. Therefore, it was the latter who went down in the history books as the first team to represent Msida in the Maltese Football League. In November 1909, the editor of the Daily Malta Chronicle offered a cup to the students of the Lyceum and University to be used for a cup competition. The offer was accepted but, later on, lack of participation forced the organisers to hold the competition in the form of a league. St Joseph's were one of the five founder members of the Civilian Football League.

St Joseph's made their debut in the league on October 13, 1910, against the Boys Empire League. The Saints had a good start, winning an interesting game by three goals to two. Then, in their next match they had a walkover against the University FT. With four points under their belt, the team from Msida entered the ground for the game against Sliema Wanderers in defiant mood. Things however did not go as expected for them. When, midway through the second half, the Wanderers took a 2–1 lead, angry spectators invaded the pitch and the game was abandoned. Sliema were awarded the points and St Joseph's refused to honour their last fixture against Floriana. The next season, the league was not held and for the best part of the season St Joseph's were inactive. In 1911–12, the competition was held under the direction of the Malta Athletic Club but because of their reputation, St Joseph's United were not invited. Towards the end of the season however, the proprietors of the newly opened Mile End Sports Ground conceived a cup competition and this time, St Joseph's were admitted. St Joseph's were drawn against Senglea Shamrocks in the first round of the competition. Troisi opened the score for the team from Msida but Polidano equalised soon afterwards. In the second period the Saints took the initiative and were rewarded with another goal from Troisi.

In the semi-finals, the Saints met the strong Valletta United. The Citizens were clear favourites to win this encounter but St Joseph's relieved the pundits of their money with a merited 1–0 victory. The final was held on March 31, 1912, at the Mile End. St Joseph's opponents were none other than the famous St George's FC. The Cospicuans had a formidable team in those days and St Joseph's were clearly out of their depth against such talented opponents. They resorted to kicking and rough play but this did not prevent St George's from winning by three goals to nil. After this game, St Joseph's United packed up their boots and they were never seen again at the Mile End.

=== Next Decade (1922–92) ===
For the next decade, Msida were represented by Msida Rangers in MFA competitions. Another team from Msida, Msida Rovers took part in the Second Division in 1922–23 and the First Division for the next three years. St. Joseph's FC was the first Msida club to win major honours, claiming the Second Division Championship in 1929–30, the Fourth Division championship in 1934–35 and the Third Division Championship in 1935–36. During this same season St. Joseph's reached the final of the Amateur Cup beating Melita 1–0 after extra-time.

St. Joseph's were joint-leaders in Division 2 in 1936–37 but lost 1–3 to Tigers in a championship decider. Following World War II, a new team, called Msida Amateurs, was set up. The team won Division 3 Section D in 1944–45. The following season the team changes its name to Msida Wolves. The Wolves won Division 3 Section D in 1947–48 and were promoted to Division 2 where they stayed for eight years.

Msida Wolves changes their name to Msida St. Joseph's in 1955 and took part in Division 3. On several occasions they went close to winning promotion on several occasions until finally, in 1965–66, they won Section B, beating Little Rainbows and Siggiewi in the play-offs to be crowned champions. The Saints had an excellent season in Division 2 winning the championship in their first attempt. Msida were relegated after just one season in Division 1 but the following season, they regained promotion to the First Division. During the same year, Msida St. Joseph won the Second Division Knock-Out beating Zejtun Corinthians 1–0 in the final. The Saints made a quick return to Division 2 and it was only in 1974–75 that they won promotion after placing second. The Saints also managed to win the Knock-Out.

Back in Division 1, Msida had a quite comfortable stay in the top division. The following season, they avoided relegation beating Zebbug Rangers in a decider. After four years in Division 1, Msida were relegated at the end of season 1978–79. They regained promotion the following season but life in the top division was too difficult for Msida. They were eventually relegated to the Third Division in 1991–92.

=== Three-season running (2000–2003) ===
During season 2000–01, Msida St. Joseph got promoted to the Second Division. The team completely dominated the season and took only 1 loss, which was against St. Georges. Jean Pierre Mifsud Triganza, who was on loan from Floriana, ended the season as top scorer.

The following season, Msida St. Joseph yet again won the title and the promotion to the First Division. It was a remarkable season where Msida got promoted without losing a game and getting a total of 54 points, scoring 47 and conceding just 12 from a total of 22 matches. For the second year running, on loan striker, Jean Pierre Mifsud Triganza won the top scorer award with a total of 24 goals.

It was the season 2002–03, and Msida were in the first division. In a remarkable season, for the third season running, Msida won the division and the promotion. During this season, Msida's only foreign player, Daniel Nwoke won the top scorer award.

=== Glorious Stage (2003–2008) ===
After a lapse of 22 years, and just 3 years after being in the lowest division, Msida St. Joseph made their return to Malta's top division. Msida St. Joseph remained in the Premier Division following a win in the final match against Balzan Youths. The rest of the season saw other wins, including the 4–1 win against Sliema, 3–1 win against Valletta and the 0–0 draw against Birkirkara.

Following the first season in the premiership there was a change in the administration of the club. Roberto Goveani formerly of Torino Calcio, became the new president of the club. The expectations were quite high. The team narrowly missed a place in the Championship Pool, but they made up for it in the relegation pool, with the club achieving safety after just three games. Thus this helped the club to focus on the FA Trophy. In one of the most amazing runs, Msida managed to arrive to the final. Led by the brilliant Mario Petrone, the club defied all odds to eliminate Mosta, Senglea, Hibernians and Marsaxlokk. The semi-final against Marsaxlokk will be remembered for all the drama it had. Msida equalised in the last minute of extra time, and then went on to win in the penalty shootout after two great saves by Omar Borg. For the second time in history and the first time in 93 years, Msida St. Joseph were again in the final of the FA Trophy. The Final was a great match. The first half ended 0–0, but then early in the second half, the team suffered a double blow. First Bkara scored and then a minute later Msida were a man down. But despite being with 10 men, Msida managed to equalise through Manuel Boni. But just a minute later Bkara scored again, and that was it. Msida lost the final 2–1.

Following the successful 2004/05 season, there was again a change in administration. Roberto Goveani resigned from President and Dr. Kevin Deguara became the new president, whilst Edward Calleja, Robert Farrugia and Keith Abela-Wadge formed part of the new executive board. The club set a target of getting in the Championship Pool for the first time ever. The first thing was to sign one of the best foreigners to ever grace the Maltese Islands, Olalekan Ibrahim Babatunde. Together with marksman Daniel Nwoke, now in his 4th season with Msida, they made great tandem in attack. In January third foreigner was signed. In Babatunde, Nwoke and now Ousseni Zongo, Msida definitely had the best trio of foreigners in Malta. The three foreigners together with the emergence of the youngsters Tyrone Farrugia, Paul Fenech and Josef Mifsud, helped the team to achieve its target, that of getting to the Championship Pool for the first time ever. It was achieved in the last match of the first phase, in the derby against archrivals Hamrun Spartans. Msida needed a win at all cost and in an amazing match, Msida managed to win 2–0 to write history yet again. The Championship Pool was something new for Msida, and the majority of the matches were quite difficult but Msida managed to get some amazing results like 0–0 and 1–1 against Hibernians and the 3–3 against Sliema Wanderers.

The following season the team had another change in presidency when Edward Calleja started the season as acting president and then after a couple of months Antoine Portelli became the new president of the club. During the off season the team strengthened itself with the signings of players like Peter Pullicino, Roderick Baldacchino and Pio Sciriha. Following a good start of the season, the team spent the first half neck to neck with Marsaxlokk FC and made it to the Championship Pool for the second season running. Unfortunately at the end the team ended up in sixth place.

At the beginning of season 2007/08, following Antoine Portelli resignation from President, long term committee member Mr. Robert Farrugia became Club's president. The Club sold some of its assets but managed to sign one of the most interesting foreigners to ever arrive in Malta, Njongo Lobe Priso Doding. Even though the team ended up in the relegation Pool, the team made sure of salvation early on the season. During the relegation the team managed to get its biggest win ever, against archrivals Pieta, with the score of 7–0, where Njongo Lobe Priso Doding became the first ever Msida St. Joseph FC to score 5 goals in one match.

The following season the team continued to sell some of its assets, but still competed really well in the first phase where the team was just 1 point away from securing another Championship Pool appearance. Unfortunately the team suffered 3 losses in the last 3 matches, whilst our nearest rivals Marsaxlokk won its three matches and thus the Club ended up in the relegation pool for the second year running. At the end of the first phase, it started to come out that the local police and MFA were investigating a corruption case involving Marsaxlokk's match against our Club in the first round. The Maltese Courts immediately ruled that there was foul play involved by Marsaxlokk but the MFA didn't come to a decision. When the relegation pool started, the uncertainty of the Marsaxlokk case was playing on the players’ minds, and the team ended up sharing bottom place with another 2 team. This led to a decider being played between Msida and Tarxien which at the end our team lost on penalties to be relegated. Still as the season came to an end, no one was sure in what division the team would play since the Marsaxlokk case was pending. Finally just weeks before the First Division had to start, and a couple of days after the Premier Division started, Marsaxlokk were found guilty and demoted to the First Division, and our club was re-instated to the Premier Division. Unfortunately with all the uncertainty surrounding our club, the majority of the players had left and the Club ending up fighting a lost cause. Financial problems continued to cripple the club and at the end of season 2009/10 the team ended in bottom place with a negative number of points.

After 7 years in the Premier Division the Club prepared for its first experience in the First Division. The committee had decided that it was important to focus on the financial aspect and not on the team. This weakened the team resulting in 2 draws by the end of the season. Although it was a difficult season, three important things were achieved. Firstly, the club's finances started to be resolved. Secondly, because of the financial difficulties of the club, many youngsters from the club's Nursery started joining the first squad and made their debuts during this season. Thirdly, the Club managed to sell its old premises and acquire a lease on a new premises which were to be converted into the new club House and Bar in the most central part of Msida.

=== Renewed Success (2011–present) ===
Following back to back relegation, season 2011/12 was very important for the team. Following a lapse of seven years, Joseph Demarco returned to the club as president, whilst Robert Farrugia became the Council Member for the club. The team main focus was to continue reducing the club's debt as well as not getting relegated. Following good work by the committee and team, both objectives were achieved and the team finished a respectable seventh place with a 5-match undefeated streak. New Coach Anthony Dalli continued on the previous season policy in putting in young talent from the club's Nursery into the first team. By the end of the season more than half of the squad had come through the club's Academy.

The club was looking forward for season 2012/13. The committee together with the coach Anthony Dalli worked hard to build a competitive squad with established players that complements the club's youngsters, and managed to attract more sponsors to help out the team, who believed in the vision and project of the committee. After a string of impressive performances the club finished season 2012/13 in second place thus winning promotion to the First Division.

In October 2013, early in the 2013/14 campaign, Carmine Ferrara was named as President of the club. He brought along a host of ideas and his focus was mainly on following a professional model of business. Mr Ferrara together with his team worked towards improving the structure, squad and facilities in order to achieve greater goals.

In early 2014 the club along with Mr Ferrara noted that although intentions were positive, the model Mr Ferrara was attempting to use was not inline with Maltese Football regulations and ideology. Therefore, Mr Ferrara along with the committee decided that he should step down from his role as president and leave the club. In his stead Mr Richard Galea was appointed as President of the club.

In June 2014 the Msida St. Joseph Football Club held a general meeting for all members in which it discussed the progress made during the 2013/14 season as well as discussing the upcoming season 2014/15. During this meeting a new Committee was set up headed by the Mr Edward Calleja as president and Mr Alan Abela Wadge and Mr Robert Farrugia as Vice presidents.

Mr Calleja holds a history with the club and this is his second time in charge, the first time being the 2005/06 season. The club sought new members to join the committee. As a result, Paul McAlister joined the group. The main mission of the executive committee this season is to keep the club on track within Division-1 while at the same time continuing to improve the business model of the club.

== Players ==
=== Current squad ===
As of 7 April 2025

Note: Flags indicate national team as defined under FIFA eligibility rules; some limited exceptions apply. Players may hold more than one non-FIFA nationality.

No.	Pos.	Nation	Player
1	GK	MLT	Nathan Steve Mangion
2	DF	MLT	Matthew Borda
2	DF	MLT	Julian Delmar
2	DF	MLT	Terson Tabone
2	DF	MLT	Paride Giacinto
4	DF	MLT	Daniel Calleja
5	DF	MLT	Deon Caruana
7	MF	JPN	Yuya Emura
8	MF	MLT	Zayon Carter
8	MF	MLT	Mark Giusti
9	FW	MLT	Andy Borg
9	FW	MLT	Luke Farrugia
10	FW	MLT	Mateo Calle Cardona
11	MF	MLT	Domenico Marsala

No.	Pos.	Nation	Player
11	MF	MLT	Julian Zammit
14		MLT	Leon Pulis
15		MLT	Paris Micallef
16		MLT	Carlston Cardona
17		MLT	Nicky Attard Portugese
19		MLT	Kubilay Karadol
20		MLT	Mousstafa Robert Malool
24	GK	MLT	Connor Frendo
27		MLT	Evair Grech
28		MLT	Agatino Sicali
30		MLT	Andrew Spiteri
30		MLT	Warren Zerafa
33		MLT	Iyram-Raul Azzopardi
90		MLT	Luke Camilleri

== Youth Academy ==
Msida St. Joseph Youth Academy is the Youth Academy for Maltese Football Club Msida Saint-Joseph F.C. The Youth Academy was founded in 1996. It has educated young players who have become regulars in Maltese Football.

== Msida St. Joseph FC Futsal Team ==
Note: Flags indicate national team as defined under FIFA eligibility rules; some limited exceptions apply. Players may hold more than one non-FIFA nationality.

No.	Pos.	Nation	Player
1	GK	MLT	Etienne Ellul
4	MF	MLT	David Debatista
7	DF	MLT	Kevin Agius (captain)
9	DF	MLT	Duncan Muscat
13	MF	MLT	Matthew Dingli

No.	Pos.	Nation	Player
16	MF	MLT	Kurt Mifsud
17	FW	MLT	Adrian Calafato
18	FW	MLT	Darren Attard
22	MF	MLT	Jonathan Brincat
30	GK	MLT	Nikola Farrugia

== Coaching staff ==
(Italy) Giuseppe Cristaldi	Head coach
(Malta) Mario Caruana	Assistant coach

== Committee ==
Msida St. Joseph F.C. Executive Committee season 2014/2015

(Malta) Mr Edward Calleja	President
(Malta) Mr Alan Abela Wadge	Vice President
(Malta) Mr Robert Farrugia	Vice President
(Malta) Mr Steve Farrugia	general secretary
(Malta) Mr Richard Galea	Financial Director
(Malta) Mr Paul McAlister	Assistant Secretary/Social & Media Officer
(Malta) Mr Simon Pace	Assistant Tresurer
(Malta) Mr Ian Micallef	Kit Manager
(Malta) Mr Stephen Lovegrove	Team Manager
(Malta) Mr Jesmond Abela	committee member
(Malta) Mr Joseph Cini	committee member
(Malta) Mr Karl Pace	committee member

== Honorary presidents ==
(Malta) Mr Kevin Deguara	Honorary President
(Malta) Mr Joseph Demarco	Honorary President

== Honours ==
- Maltese First Division
  - Champions (1): 2002–03
- Maltese Second Division
  - Champions (3):1929–30, 1966–67, 2001–02
- Division 2 Knock-Out
  - Winners (2): 1968–69, 1974–75
- Division 2 Sons of Malta Cup
  - Winners (1) : 1975–76
- Maltese Third Division
  - Champions (3): 1935–36, 1965–66, 2000–01
- Division 3 Section B
  - Winners (4) : 1944–45, 1947–48, 1963–64, 1965–66
- Division 4
  - Champions (1): 1934–35
- Amateur Cup
  - Winners (1): 1935–36
