= Qormi F.C. =

Maltese football club

Qormi
- Full name: Qormi Football Club
- Nicknames: Sofor u Suwed (Yellow-Blacks) "Tal Hobz" (The Bakers); Tal-Panini; Yellows
- Founded: 1961; 65 years ago
- Ground: Thomaso Ground, Qormi, Malta
- Capacity: 500
- Manager: Lydon Fenech
- League: National Amateur League
- 2021–22: National Amateur League, Group B, 8th
Home colours	Away colours

Qormi Football Club is a Maltese football club from the city of Qormi, that currently plays in the Maltese National Amateur League. They have won 4 league titles, in the 1969-70, 1982-83, 1994-95, and 2023-24 seasons.

== History ==
Qormi Football Club was founded in 1961 after the amalgamation of Qormi Youngsters (from the parish of St. Sebastian) and Qormi United (from the parish of St. George), which is from where the club acquired its motto Fl-Għaqda s-Saħħa, (English: Strength in Unity). The first club from Qormi dates back to the 1920s. The club thus celebrated the 50th anniversary in 2011. Qormi Football Club is affiliated with the Malta Football Association (MFA) which is the main football body in Malta. The Qormi FC Youth Nursery is a sub-committee of Qormi FC and almost 200 youngsters are affiliated with the nursery.

Qormi Football Grounds (Thomaso Grounds) are situated in Valletta Road, Qormi and the amenities include pitches, a conference hall, fitness centre, bar and the Qormi FC Youth Nursery Headquarters. Qormi's official colours are Yellow and Black. Qormi's biggest arch rivals are Zebbug Rangers from neighbouring town of Zebbug, Malta.

The club has spent some of its seasons yo-yo-ing from one division to another, but has recently started to build a more solid pace, progressing slowly but steadily to the upper divisions. Season 2007–08 was the best ever season in the club's recent history. Qormi clinched a second position finish in the Maltese First Division, following a hardly fought play-off penalty win against Mosta, which acquired the club's accession to the Maltese Premier League. Season 2008–09 will be the first season that Qormi will spend in the highest echelons of Maltese football since the old First Division was renamed the Premier League. To prepare for their first Maltese Premier League campaign, Qormi brought in ten new signings and gave a new look to the club's image. The team performed well in pre-season friendlies. In a press release, the club's committee expressed its aim to stay in top flight and possibly even making it to the Championship Pool. Nevertheless, Qormi still struggled against relegation like most newly promoted teams in the Premier League. Promotion was only achieved on the last day of the league, with a 2–0 win on Hamrun Spartans F.C. Season 2009–10 saw Qormi achieving a historical stint in the Maltese top-flight, as well as in the FA Trophy. The success was especially aided with arguably the best signing in the club's history, Camilo. Camilo finished top scorer in the league with 24 goals in 22 appearances where Qormi finished in the third place. Qormi then had to play a decider match to determine the taker of the Europa League spot for the next season, a match which Qormi lost to Sliema 0–2. Qormi also could have achieved a spot through the cup, however, albeit making it to the final, Qormi lost to Valletta 1–2.

After the departure of Camilo and other players, as well as coaches Jesmond Zerafa and Vincent Carbonaro, Qormi faced a difficult season the year after. Season 2010–11 saw Qormi retaining Stefan Giglio and Matthew Bartolo, and acquiring the services of George Mallia, Belgian Jason Vandelannoite, Nigerian Abubakar Bello-Osagie, South Korean Kang Ho-Jung in the first half of the season, and Brazilian Josue, Greek Christos Karamanolis, Guinea-Bissau Ibraima Sumaila Vaz Sani, and most notably, the Maltese national football team captain Michael Mifsud, in the second half of the season. Also notable was the change in technical staff at the beginning of the season, with Stephen Azzopardi heading the team. During the season, Azzopardi utilised various youth players coming up from the Youth Nursery. Qormi managed to finish eighth (only one team was relegated in Season 2010–11 however).

Qormi kept struggling season after season, with the occasional fluke in the Maltese FA Trophy. Qormi reached the final three times, all as runners-up, in 2009–10, 2011–12 and 2012–13.

The yellow-blacks celebrated their 50th anniversary during season 2011–12. On the pitch, as already mentioned, Qormi reached the final match of the Maltese cup competition, while holding various celebration activities and issuing various memorabilia, including a book relating history of football in Qormi between 1961 and 2011.

The club kept on struggling to avoid relegation, while enthusiasm for football in the city of Qormi began to wane. Qormi finished 8th in season 2014–15, once again clearing itself from relegation on the last matchday.

It was then revealed that the club had financial problems during an Extraordinary General Meeting held on August 13, 2015. The members agreed that the executive committee had to revisit the club's budgets prior to the 2015–16 season.

== Kit evolution ==
2005–06 home	2005–06 away
2008–09 home	2008–09 away	2008–09 third
2009–10 home	2009–10 away
2010–11 home	2010–11 away
2011–12 50th Anniversary	2011–12 home	2011–12 away
2014–15 home	2014–15 away

== Achievements ==
- Maltese First Division Champions: 2017–18
- Maltese First Division Runners-up: 2007–08
- Maltese Second Division Champions: 1968–69, 1972–73, 2005–06
- Maltese Second Division Section Winners: 1988–89
- Maltese Second Division Runners-up: 1977–78
- Maltese Second Division Knock-Out Finalists: 1966–67, 1972–73
- Maltese Second Division Sons of Malta Cup Champions: 1969–70, 1973–74
- Maltese Third Division Section Winners: 1962–63, 1963–64, 1982–83, 1988–89
- Maltese Third Division Play-offs Winners: 2003–04
- Maltese Third Division Knock-Out Winners: 1962–63
- Maltese Cup Runners-up: 2009–10, 2011–12, 2012–13

== Current squad ==
=== Players ===
Note: Flags indicate national team as defined under FIFA eligibility rules; some limited exceptions apply. Players may hold more than one non-FIFA nationality.

No.	Pos.	Nation	Player
1	GK	MLT	Jamie Azzopardi
6	MF	MLT	Yannick Yankam
9	DF	MLT	Manolito Micallef
10	FW	MLT	Michael Camilleri
12	GK	MLT	Dorian Bugeja
14	DF	CZE	Luboš Adamec
15	MF	MLT	Luke Buttigieg
18	MF	MLT	Michael Borg
20	DF	MLT	Gaetano Gesualdi

No.	Pos.	Nation	Player
27	DF	MLT	Alessio Cassar (Captain)
68	FW	BRA	Alexsandro
95	MF	BRA	Kassiano Soares
97	FW	MLT	Iven Zammit
99	FW	MLT	Tensior Gusman
—	FW	BRA	Leozinho
—	MF	MEX	Claudio Celis
—	DF	MLT	Glen Zammit
—	MF	MLT	Shamison Zammit

== Club officials and coaching staff 2022–23 ==
=== Club officials and committee members (Elected 4 May 2022) ===
- Vice-president: Robert Farrugia
- Secretary: Redeno Apap
- Assistant Secretary: Christian Fenech
- Treasurer: Stephen Pace
- Ass.Treasurer:Jamie Zammit
- Member (Supporters): Kerstin Gatt

=== Coaching staff ===
- Coach:Lydon Fenech
- Assistant Coach: Fatos Daja
- Team manager: Jurgen Mifsud

== Historical list of coaches ==
- (Malta) Edward Darmanin (1979 – 1980)
- (Albania) Fatos Daja (2001 – 2002)
- (Malta) Oliver Spiteri (Jul 1, 2004 – Nov 11, 2004)
- (Malta) Martin Gregory (2004 – 2006)
- (Malta) Jesmond Zerafa (Jul 2007 – Apr 28, 2010)
- (Malta) Vince Carbonaro (Apr 29, 2010 – Jun 6, 2010)
- (Malta) Stephen Azzopardi (Jun 7, 2010 – Oct 18, 2012)
- (Malta) Jesmond Zerafa (Oct 19, 2012 – Jun 21, 2013)
- (Italy) Tommaso Volpi (June 22, 2013 – Dec 20, 2013)
- (Italy) Karel Zeman (Jan 3, 2014 – Jun 30, 2014)
- (Malta) Josef Mansueto (Jun 26, 2014 – Feb 2, 2015)
- (England) Mark Miller (Feb 4, 2015 – May 15, 2015)
- (Malta) Jesmond Zerafa (Jun 11, 2015 – Oct 15, 2015)
- (Malta) Johann Scicluna (Oct 23, 2015 - Feb 1, 2016)
- (Italy) Marco Banchini (Feb 2, 2016 – Feb 29, 2016)
- (Malta) Johann Scicluna (Mar 1, 2016 - May 19, 2016)
- (Malta) Brian Spiteri (May 19, 2016 - Nov 6, 2018)
- (Malta) Mario Muscat (Nov 16, 2018 - Jun 11, 2019)
- (Malta) Vince Carbonaro (Jul 2, 2019 - Jun 15, 2020)
- (Bulgaria) Borislav Gyorev (Jul 1, 2020 - May 16, 2021)
- (Malta) Demis Paul Scerri (Jul 7, 2021 - Jan 25, 2022)
- (Croatia) Davor Filipović (Aug 27, 2021 - Jun 30, 2022)
- (Malta) Lydon Fenech (July 1, 2022 – Present)

== Seasons ==
This is a list of seasons played by Qormi Football Club in Maltese football, from 2004 to the present day.

Season	Division	Position	Significant Events	Maltese Cup
2004/05	Maltese Second Division	3rd
2005/06	Maltese Second Division	1st	Champions
2006/07	Maltese First Division	6th
2007/08	Maltese First Division	3rd	Play Off Winners
2008/09	Maltese Premier League	7th
