= Mosta F.C. =

Association football club in Malta

Mosta
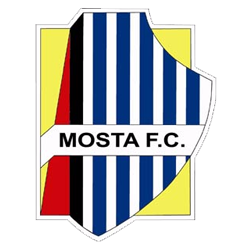
- Full name: Mosta Football Club
- Nickname: Baqar
- Founded: 1935; 91 years ago
- Ground: Charles Abela Memorial Stadium, Mosta
- Capacity: 700
- Chairman: George Galea
- Manager: Mario Muscat
- League: Maltese Premier League
- 2025–26: 11th of 14
Home colours	Away colours

Mosta Football Club is a Maltese football club based in the town of Mosta on the island of Malta. They have played in the Maltese Premier League since the 2011–12 season.

Mosta FC's eternal rivals are their neighbours Naxxar Lions with whom they contest the Derby of Northern Malta otherwise known as the Northern Classic. The context of this derby was that Mosta up until 1608 was considered to be a part of Naxxar even though the people identified themselves as Mostin. In that year both Mosta and Għargħur gained independence from Naxxar, with both of Għargħur F.C. and Mosta FC sharing a rivalry with Naxxar Lions; however the derby between Mosta and Naxxar is more fiercely contested as for hundreds of years they were the two largest towns in the Northern Region, and also because they are considered to be the best two clubs in the region.

== Futsal ==
Mosta F.C. also had a futsal team, which participated in Malta's top futsal league until 2024. The 2014–15 season was the last edition of the Enemed Futsal League in which Mosta participated, finishing 7th out of 9 teams. The previous season, Mosta finished 8th out of 15 clubs.

In the quarter-final of the 2014–15 cup edition, Mosta F.C. lost 1–8 to Luxol St. Andrews.

Currently, only the youth team exists, even producing players for the under-17 and under-19 national teams.

Mosta F.C. lost the final of the 2021–22 Youth Futsal League to Sliema Wanderers.

== Achievements ==
- Maltese First Division 3rd Place (Promoted): 2010–11
- Maltese First Division Champions: 1986–87
- Maltese First Division Runners-up: 2001–02, 2004–05
- Maltese Second Division Champions: 1984–85, 1992–93
- Maltese Second Division Section Winners: 1978–79, 1992–93
- Maltese Second Division Runners-up: 1973–74
- Maltese Third Division Champions: 1964–65
- Maltese Third Division Section Winners: 1968–69

== Players ==
=== Current squad ===
As of 23 July 2026

Note: Flags indicate national team as defined under FIFA eligibility rules; some limited exceptions apply. Players may hold more than one non-FIFA nationality.

No.	Pos.	Nation	Player
1	GK	GAB	Anse Ngoubi Demba
2	DF	MLT	Lydon Seychell
4	DF	NGR	Emmanuel Ugwu
5	DF	MLT	Sasha Cachia
6	MF	POR	Gilson Costa
7	FW	MLT	Nevin Portelli
8	MF	NGR	Chukwuemeka Eke
9	FW	MLT	Peter Ohaka
10	MF	BRA	Giancarlo Goncalves
11	DF	MLT	Kurt Zammit
14	FW	GHA	Ernest Agyiri (on loan from Randers)
15	MF	NGR	Stephen Eikwu-Ojo
16	MF	MLT	Luca Chetcuti
20	DF	GHA	Prince Afriyie

No.	Pos.	Nation	Player
22	GK	NGR	Akpan David Udoh
23	FW	BIH	Azer Kozic
29	DF	NGR	Charles Oderinde
30	FW	MLT	Nathan Cross
31	FW	NGR	Emmanuel Chukwuemeka
41	MF	BRA	Pedro Cacho
42	MF	GHA	Simon Zibo
77	FW	MLT	Jamie Scerri
80	DF	MLT	Kyle Gatt
93	DF	BRA	Thiaguinho
96	MF	BRA	Wanderson Gotinha
99	GK	MLT	Jayden Farrugia
-	MF	GHA	Geoffrey Acheampong

=== Youth Players in use 2023-2024 ===
Note: Flags indicate national team as defined under FIFA eligibility rules; some limited exceptions apply. Players may hold more than one non-FIFA nationality.

No.	Pos.	Nation	Player

=== Out on loan ===
Note: Flags indicate national team as defined under FIFA eligibility rules; some limited exceptions apply. Players may hold more than one non-FIFA nationality.

No.	Pos.	Nation	Player

== European record ==
As of match played 15 July 2021

Season	Competition	Round	Club	Home	Away	Agg.
2021–22	UEFA Europa Conference League	1QR	(Slovakia) Spartak Trnava	3–2	0–2	3–4

Mosta scored the first goal in the history of the UEFA Conference League.

Notes

- QR: Qualifying round 4

== Club officials ==
Name	Role
Technical Staff
Mario Muscat	Head coach
Davor Filipović	Assistant coach
Simon Vella	Goalkeepers Coach
Jeancarl Azzopardi	Physiotherapist
Jason Vella	Team Manager
Robert Frendo	Kit Manager
Board Members
George Galea	President and First Delegate
Michael Galea	Secretary
Owen Vella	Treasurer
Adrian Farrugia	President
Charlene Farrugia	Assistant Secretary
Melchiore Dimech	Board Member
Johann Cilia	Head of Youth Development Sector

== Historical list of coaches ==
- (Malta) Ronnie Cocks
- (Malta) John Calleja (1968 - 1969)
- (Bulgaria) Guentcho Dobrev (1988 - 1991)
- (Bulgaria) Guentcho Dobrev (1999 - 2000)
- (Malta) Paul Zammit (Jun 1, 2003 – Oct 30, 2005)
- (Germany) Michael Molzahn (Jul 1, 2008 – Jun 30, 2009)
- (Malta) Oliver Spiteri (July 1, 2009 – Nov 16, 2011)
- (Malta) Steve D'Amato (Nov 17, 2011 – Feb 13, 2013)
- (Serbia) Danilo Dončić (Feb 16, 2013 – Dec 24, 2013)
- (Italy) Enrico Piccioni (Dec 24, 2013 – Nov 3, 2014)
- (England) Peter Smith (Nov 10, 2014 – June 10, 2015)
- (Malta) Ivan Zammit (Jun 10, 2015 – Aug 15, 2015)
- (Malta) Anthony Cremona (Aug 21, 2015 – Mar 21, 2016)
- (Malta) Ivan Zammit (Apr 1, 2016 – Jun 30, 2016)
- (Albania) Edmond Lufi (Jul 12, 2016 – Oct 1, 2016)
- (Malta) Ivan Zammit (Oct 13, 2016 – Dec 13, 2016)
- (Slovakia) Zsolt Hornyák (Jan 2, 2017 – Apr 1, 2017)
- (Malta) Johann Scicluna (Apr 1, 2017 – Jun 30, 2018)
- (Italy) Fausto Craighero (Jul 1, 2018 – Jun 30, 2019)
- (Italy) Enrico Piccioni (Jul 31, 2018 – Nov 16, 2018)
- (Malta) Johann Cilia (Nov 16, 2018 – Nov 21, 2018) (caretaker)
- (England) Mark Miller (Nov 22, 2018 – June 16, 2020)
- (Malta) Mario Muscat

== Women's team ==
The women's team of Mosta plays in the country's top division, the Maltese First Division. In 2010–11 it won its first championship and thus qualified to the 2011–12 UEFA Women's Champions League. The team was runners-up in the 1998 and 1999 Maltese Women's Cup and recently won the 2012 cup.
