= List of foreign football players in Malta =

This category is for non-Maltese footballers who currently play or have played in any of the Maltese leagues. The list includes also players that earned Maltese nationality during the years since being Maltese or marrying a Maltese wife. Players with two different nationalities are written in both of the countries. (As to January 19, 2010)

== Albania ==
- Fatos Daja
- Vilson Caushi
- Renis Hyka
- Edmond Lufi

== Angola ==
- Mawete Júnior

== Argentina ==
- Julio Alcorsé
- Walter Acevedo
- Rodrigo Cariaga
- Pablo Doffo
- Cesar Paiber

== Australia ==
- Leighton Grech
- Daniel Severino

== Benin ==
- Florent Raimy
- Salomon Wisdom

== Bosnia and Herzegovina ==
- Sanin Ortas
- Siniša Radak
- Senad Repuh

== Brazil ==
- Anderson
- André Rocha da Silva
- Bizú
- Camilo
- Daniel Mariano Bueno
- Denni
- Elton Morelato
- Éverson
- Éverton
- Italo Nogueira
- Ivan
- Marcelo Pereira
- Marcos Aurélio
- Marco Morgon
- Michael Douglas Lima
- Pedrinho
- Ramón
- Renato Conceição
- Wendell Gomes

== Bulgaria ==
- Sasho Angelov
- Hari Borislavov
- Valeri Bojinov
- Martin Deanov
- Peycho Deliminkov
- Nikolay Kirilov
- Dragomir Draganov
- Rumen Galabov
- Stanimir Georgiev
- Svetlan Kondev
- Milen Penchev
- Nikola Slavtchev
- Mitko Trendafilov
- Emil Yanchev
- Borislav Giorev
- Krasimir Manolov

== Burkina Faso ==
- Ousseni Zongo
- Saïdou Panandétiguiri

== Cameroon ==
- Ernest Nfor

== Central African Republic ==
- Boris Sandjo
- Marcelin Tamboulas

== Chile ==
- Francisco Arriagada
- Juan Manuel Artiaga
- Edison Bilbao
- Jonathan Bilbao
- José Luis Gamonal

== Congo (Republic of the Congo) ==
- Rufin Oba

== Costa Rica ==
- Victor Coto Ortega
- Windell Gabriels

== Curaçao ==
- Richmar Siberie

== Czech Republic ==
- Petr Bartes
- Martin Klein
- Pavel Mraz

== Denmark ==
- Ronni Hartvig
- Carl Zachhau

== Dominican Republic ==
- Enmy Peña

== DR Congo (Democratic Republic of the Congo) ==
- Yannick Bolasie
- Landry Mulemo

== England ==
- Chris Bart-Williams
- Mark Briggs
- Nathan Charnock
- Barry Gallagher
- Peter Hatch
- Richard Naylor
- Paul Mariner
- Tony Morley
- Carl Saunders
- Donovan Simmonds
- Kris Thackray
- Danny de Abela-Borg

== Equatorial Guinea ==
- Eloy Edu – St. Andrews, Tarxien Rainbows
- David García Mitogo – Vittoriosa Stars
- Diosdado Mbele – Hibernians
- Rui Da Gracia – Hibernians
- Óscar Siafá – Birkirkara – 2024–

== Finland ==
- Pekka Helin
- Kimmo Hovi – Melita – 2014
- Zakaria Kibona – Mosta – 2012
- Felix Lehtinen – Gudja United – 2024
- Salomo Ojala – Mosta – 2025–
- Timo Paasolainen

== France ==
- Amed Davy Sylla

== Georgia (Georgia (country)) ==
- Grigol Gvazava

== Germany ==
- Heiner Backhaus

== Ghana ==
- Asante Agyemang
- Abudulai Issaka
- Nii Nortey Ashong
- Elvis Sakyi

== Guinea-Bissau ==
- Arnaud Mendy

== Hungary ==
- Attila Filkor
- Györgyi Handel

== Ireland (Republic of Ireland) ==
- Declan O'Brien

== Italy ==
- Cristiano Bergodi
- Domenico Di Carlo
- Mauro Di Lello
- Christian Terlizzi
- Paltemio Barbetti
- Andrea Pisanu
- Fabrizio Miccoli
- Cristian Zaccardo

== Jamaica ==
- Nathan Koo-Boothe

== Latvia ==
- Maksims Daņilovs
- Oļegs Malašenoks

== Lithuania ==
- Donatas Vencevicius

== Macedonia (North Macedonia) ==
- Darko Krsteski
- Borče Manevski

== Mali ==
- Souleymane Diamoutène

== Moldova ==
- Andrian Caşcaval
- Nicolae Milinceanu

== Montenegro ==
- Aleksandar Madžar
- Nikola Bogdanović
- Draško Braunović
- Ivan Janjušević
- Bojan Kaljević

== Netherlands ==
- Sylvano Comvalius
- Jordi Cruyff
- Geert den Ouden

== New Zealand ==
- Kim Wright

== Nigeria ==
- Olomuyiwa Agonun
- Murphy Akanji
- Akanni-Sunday Wasiu
- Minabo Asechemie
- Ibrahim Babatunde
- Haruna Babangida
- Ndubisi Chukunyere
- Haruna Doda
- Sunday Eboh
- Augustine Eguavoen
- Anthony Ewurum
- Anthony Evi Parker
- Precious Monye
- Essien Mbong
- Benneth Njoku
- Chidoze Nwankwo
- Jeremiah Ani
- Daniel Nwoke
- Emeka Ochei
- Uwa Ogbodo
- Joseph Okonkwo
- Chris Oretan
- Frank Temile
- Omonigho Temile
- Edafe Uzeh

== Oman ==
- Raed Ibrahim Saleh

== Poland ==
- Piotr Branicki – Hamrun Spartans – 2019–20
- Aleksander Łubik – Melita – 2024–
- Marcel Zapytowski – Birkirkara – 2023–24

== Portugal ==
- Nuno Gomes
- Miguel Nimes Lopes De Pina
- Zeferino

== Romania ==
- Lucian Dronca
- Marius Filip^{ref}
- Alexandru Pavel
- Adrian Popescu

== Russia ==
- Viktor Zlydarev

== Scotland ==
- Derek Collins
- Malcolm Robertson
- Gary Muir
- Carlo Monti

== Serbia ==
- Andjelko Djuričić
- Danilo Dončić
- Dejan Maksić
- Zoran Levnaić
- Đorđe Pintac
- Robert Savić
- Bojan Mamić

== Somalia ==
- Ciise Aadan Abshir

== Spain ==
- Jorge Mora

== Sweden ==
- André Grabowski – Floriana – 2011–12

== Tunisia ==
- Ridha Dardouri
- Abdelkarim Nafti

== Ukraine ==
- Oleksandr Maksymov

== United Arab Emirates ==
- Hamdan Al-Kamali

== Uruguay ==
- Christian Callejas

== Venezuela ==
- Donnys Quintero

== Notes ==
1. Born in Belgium
2. Born in England
3. Born in France
4. Born in Guinea-Bissau
5. Born in Sierra Leone
6. Born in Spain
7. Capped for the Belgium national under-17 football team
8. Capped for the Belgium national under-18 football team
9. Capped for the Belgium national under-21 football team
10. Capped for the Belgium national under-23 football team
11. Capped for the Catalonia national football team
12. Capped for the Netherlands Antilles national football team
