= 2008–09 Maltese FA Trophy =

Tournament details
- Country: Malta

Final positions
- Champions: Sliema Wanderers (20th title)
- Runners-up: Valletta

The 2008–09 Maltese FA Trophy was the 71st season since its establishment. It features 20 teams from Maltese Premier League and First Division. The competition started on 25 October 2008 and ended on 30 May 2009 with the Final.

Birkirkara were the defending champions, but were eliminated in the semi-finals by Valletta.

== Results ==
When the draw was conducted four teams received a bye to the Quarterfinals. Birkirkara received a bye because they won the 2007–08 Maltese FA Trophy. Other three teams qualifying directly to the Quarterfinals are Valletta, Marsaxlokk and Sliema Wanderers, for being (except Birkirkara) three best-placed teams in last year's Premier League.

=== First round ===
In the First Round entered Premier League teams placed 4th to 10th and 10 First Division teams. The matches were played on 25, 26 October, 1 and 2 November 2008.

| Team 1 | Score | Team 2 |
|---|---|---|
25 October 2008
| Mosta | 0–2 | Vittoriosa Stars |
| St. Patrick | 3–2 | Senglea Athletic |
26 October 2008
| Tarxien Rainbows | 4–2 | Mqabba |
| Dingli Swallows | 0–3 | Floriana |
1 November 2008
| Hibernians | 2–0 | St. George's |
| Rabat Ajax | 1–3 | Ħamrun Spartans |
2 November 2008
| Msida St. Joseph | 3–0 | San Gwann |
| Pietà Hotspurs | 1–3 | Qormi |

=== Second round ===
In this round entered winners from the previous round. The matches were played on 8 and 9 November 2008.

| Team 1 | Score | Team 2 |
|---|---|---|
8 November 2008
| Tarxien Rainbows | 4–2 (a.e.t.) | Msida St. Joseph |
| Hibernians | 3–0 | Vittoriosa Stars |
9 November 2008
| St. Patrick | 0–1 | Floriana |
| Qormi | 1–2 | Ħamrun Spartans |

=== Quarter-finals ===
In this round entered winners from the previous round and four teams that had received a bye. The matches were played on 7 February 2009. All 8 teams from this round were from the Premier League. Marsaxlokk, Birkirkara, Valletta and Sliema won their ties and advanced to the semifinals.

| 7 February 2009 | Sliema Wanderers | 1–0 | Hibernians | Ħamrun |
| 15:00 | Woods 11' | Report | | Stadium: Victor Tedesco Stadium; Referee: Marco Borg (MFA) |

| 7 February 2009 | Tarxien Rainbows | 1–2 | Birkirkara | Paola |
| 15:00 | Bueno 83' | Report | Buhagiar 3'; Triganza 26' | Stadium: Hibernians Ground; Referee: Adrian Azzopardi (MFA) |

| 7 February 2009 | Hamrun Spartans | 2–3 | Marsaxlokk | Ta' Qali |
| 15:00 | Comvalius 79' (pen.); Spiteri 89' | Report | Pereira 14'; Kokavessis 25', 47' | Stadium: Ta' Qali National Stadium; Referee: Andre Arciola (MFA) |

| 7 February 2009 | Floriana | 2–2 (a.e.t.) (1–4 p) | Valletta | Ta' Qali |
| 17:00 | Doffo 2' (pen.); Dimech 104' (o.g.) | Report | Massaro 90+5', 92' | Stadium: Ta' Qali National Stadium; Referee: Alan Mario Sant (MFA) |
| | Penalties |
| | Darmanin (penalty scored); Agius (penalty missed); Briffa (penalty missed) | | (penalty scored) Scicluna; (penalty scored) Massaro; (penalty scored) Zammit; (penalty scored) Pace |

=== Semi-finals ===
The matches were played on 7 and 8 March 2009. Holders Birkirkara met the same team they met the previous year, Valletta. But this time they lost and it was Valletta who reached the final. In the other semifinal Sliema beat Marsaxlokk 4–3 on penalties after the match finished in a 1–1 draw.

| 7 March 2009 | Valletta | 2–0 | Birkirkara | Ta' Qali |
| 15:00 | Zammit 45+1'; Priso 50' | Report | | Stadium: Ta' Qali National Stadium; Referee: Adrian Azzopardi (MFA) |

| 8 March 2009 | Marsaxlokk | 1–1 (a.e.t.) (3–4 p) | Sliema Wanderers | Ta' Qali |
| 15:00 | Kokavessis 82' | Report | Muscat 78' | Stadium: Ta' Qali National Stadium; Referee: Marco Borg (MFA) |
| | Penalties |
| | Licari (penalty scored); Pereira (penalty missed); Kokavessis (penalty scored); Camenzuli (penalty scored); Sammut (penalty missed) | | (penalty scored) Dronca; (penalty missed) Woods; (penalty scored) Turner; (penalty scored) Bajada; (penalty scored) Chetcuti |

=== Final ===
The final was played on 29 May 2009.

Sliema Wanderers and Valletta met together in the Maltese FA Trophy final four times before, having previously met in 1959, 1964, 1991, and 1996. When meeting in the finals, Valletta has won it three times, while Sliema Wanderers won it once.

The last time Valletta and Sliema Wanderers met together in Maltese FA Trophy was during the 2011-12 Semi-finals when Sliema Wanderers beatValletta by 5–2.

| 29 May 2009 | Valletta | 3–3 (a.e.t.) (3–4 p) | Sliema Wanderers | Ta' Qali |
| 19:30 | Priso 49'; Agius 90+3'; Monesterolo 90+5' | Report | Muscat 52', 65'; Woods 80' | Stadium: Ta' Qali National Stadium; Referee: Christopher Lautier (MFA) |
| | Penalties |
| | Agius (penalty missed); Bezzina (penalty missed); Giglio (penalty scored); Falzon (penalty scored); Pace (penalty scored) | | (penalty scored) Turner; (penalty missed) Bajada; (penalty scored) Scerri; (penalty scored) Nišević; (penalty scored) Woods |
