= List of Maltese football transfers summer 2008 =

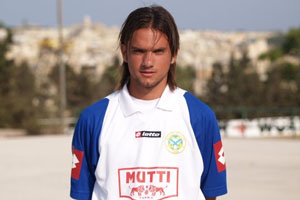
André Schembri will spend the 2008/09 on loan with Carl Zeiss Jena from Marsaxlokk.

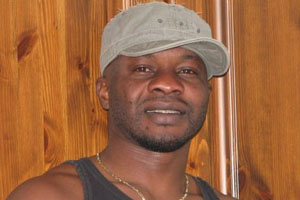
Chucks Nwoko left Sliema Wanderers and joined Qormi.

This is a list of Maltese football transfers in the summer transfer window 2008 by club. Only transfers of the Maltese Premier League are included.

The summer transfer window opened on July 1, 2008, and closed on September 1, 2008. Deals may be signed at any given moment during the season, but the actual transfer may only take place during the transfer window.

== Maltese Premier League ==
=== Birkirkara ===
In: Note: Flags indicate national team as defined under FIFA eligibility rules; some limited exceptions apply. Players may hold more than one non-FIFA nationality.

No.	Pos.	Nation	Player
—	GK	(Malta) MLT	Jonathan Debono (loan return from Mosta)
—	GK	(Malta) MLT	Joshua Galea (from Qormi)
5	DF	(Malta) MLT	Patrick Borg (loan return from Msida Saint-Joseph)
16	MF	(Malta) MLT	Trevor Cilia (from Floriana)
15	MF	(Malta) MLT	Jonathan Holland (from (Scotland) Nairn County)
11	MF	(Brazil) BRA	William (from (Brazil) Rio Claro)
20	FW	(Malta) MLT	Angus Buhagiar (from Floriana)

Out: Note: Flags indicate national team as defined under FIFA eligibility rules; some limited exceptions apply. Players may hold more than one non-FIFA nationality.

No.	Pos.	Nation	Player
—	GK	(Malta) MLT	Jonathan Debono (to Mosta)
2	DF	(Malta) MLT	Lino Galea (to Tarxien Rainbows)
5	DF	(Malta) MLT	Roderick Sammut (to Qormi)
7	MF	(Malta) MLT	Matthew Calascione (to St. Andrews)
—	MF	(Malta) MLT	Adrian Ciantar (on loan to Qormi)
—	FW	(Ivory Coast) CIV	Amed Davy Sylla (to (Denmark) Fremad Amager)

=== Floriana ===
In: Note: Flags indicate national team as defined under FIFA eligibility rules; some limited exceptions apply. Players may hold more than one non-FIFA nationality.

No.	Pos.	Nation	Player
1	GK	(Serbia) SRB	Dejan Maksić (from free agent)
12	GK	(Malta) MLT	Glen Zammit (on loan from Gudja United)
15	DF	(Malta) MLT	Steve Bonnici (from Melita)
81	DF	(Malta) MLT	Clyde Camoin (loan return from Qormi)
—	DF	(Malta) MLT	Mario Caruana (from Qormi)
66	DF	(Malta) MLT	Lee Galea (loan return from Mqabba)
19	MF	(Malta) MLT	Luke Agius (loan return from St. George's)
28	MF	(Malta) MLT	Orosco Anonam (from Sliema Wanderers)
7	MF	(Malta) MLT	Marlon Briffa (from Mqabba)
—	MF	(Malta) MLT	Roberto Brincat (from Valletta)
20	MF	(Argentina) ARG	Pablo Doffo (from Hibernians)
—	MF	(Malta) MLT	Kurt Formosa (loan return from Dingli Swallows)
—	FW	(Malta) MLT	Angus Buhagiar (loan return from Tarxien Rainbows)
99	FW	(Montenegro) MNE	Aleksandar Madžar (from Marsaxlokk)
23	FW	(Malta) MLT	Adrian Mifsud (loan return from Hibernians)
8	FW	(Malta) MLT	Dylan Zarb (on loan from Valletta)

Out: Note: Flags indicate national team as defined under FIFA eligibility rules; some limited exceptions apply. Players may hold more than one non-FIFA nationality.

No.	Pos.	Nation	Player
1	GK	(Malta) MLT	Simon Agius (on loan to Sliema Wanderers)
12	GK	(Malta) MLT	Jurgen Micallef (to Vittoriosa Stars)
13	DF	(Malta) MLT	Clifon Ciantar (loan return to Sliema Wanderers)
—	DF	(Malta) MLT	Dean Demanuele (on loan to St. Venera Lightning)
6	DF	(North Macedonia) MKD	Darko Krsteski (released)
3	DF	(Malta) MLT	Emanuel Sevasta (loan return to St. George's)
11	MF	(England) ENG	Yala Bolasie (to (England) Plymouth Argyle)
8	MF	(Malta) MLT	Christian Cassar (to Marsaxlokk)
7	MF	(Malta) MLT	Trevor Cilia (to Birkirkara)
—	MF	(Malta) MLT	Kurt Formosa (on loan to Dingli Swallows)
24	MF	(Serbia) SRB	Zoran Levnaić (to Ħamrun Spartans)
9	MF	(Malta) MLT	Manolito Micallef (to Ħamrun Spartans)
—	FW	(Malta) MLT	Angus Buhagiar (to Birkirkara)
23	FW	(Malta) MLT	Adrian Mifsud (on loan to Rabat Ajax)

=== Ħamrun Spartans ===
In: Note: Flags indicate national team as defined under FIFA eligibility rules; some limited exceptions apply. Players may hold more than one non-FIFA nationality.

No.	Pos.	Nation	Player
20	DF	(Brazil) BRA	Alex Norona (from Unknown)
4	MF	(Serbia) SRB	Zoran Levnaić (from Floriana)
99	MF	(Malta) MLT	Manolito Micallef (from Floriana)
16	FW	(Malta) MLT	Dylan Kokavessis (from Pietà Hotspurs)
7	FW	(Brazil) BRA	Ronaldo Paulista Ortega (from (Brazil) Mixto)

Out: Note: Flags indicate national team as defined under FIFA eligibility rules; some limited exceptions apply. Players may hold more than one non-FIFA nationality.

No.	Pos.	Nation	Player
4	DF	(Nigeria) NGA	Precious Monye (released)
19	DF	(Serbia) SRB	Branislav Timotić (released)
7	MF	(Malta) MLT	Kevin Borg (on loan to Tarxien Rainbows)
22	FW	(Nigeria) NGA	Alfred Effiong (to Qormi)

=== Hibernians ===
In: Note: Flags indicate national team as defined under FIFA eligibility rules; some limited exceptions apply. Players may hold more than one non-FIFA nationality.

No.	Pos.	Nation	Player
22	DF	(Bulgaria) BUL	Rumen Galabov (from Pietà Hotspurs)
3	DF	(Malta) MLT	Edward Herrera (on loan from Melita)
8	MF	(Uruguay) URU	Christian Callejas (from Unknown)
—	MF	(Cameroon) CMR	Alexis Mbongo (from Unknown)

Out: Note: Flags indicate national team as defined under FIFA eligibility rules; some limited exceptions apply. Players may hold more than one non-FIFA nationality.

No.	Pos.	Nation	Player
17	MF	(Malta) MLT	Edmond Agius (to Valletta)
—	MF	(Argentina) ARG	Pablo Doffo (to Floriana)
11	MF	(Nigeria) NGA	Edafe Uzeh (released)
18	FW	(Argentina) ARG	Julio Alcorsé (on loan to Marsaxlokk)
14	FW	(Malta) MLT	Adrian Mifsud (loan return to Floriana)
—	FW	(Cameroon) CMR	Abade Narcisse Fish (released)

=== Marsaxlokk ===
In: Note: Flags indicate national team as defined under FIFA eligibility rules; some limited exceptions apply. Players may hold more than one non-FIFA nationality.

No.	Pos.	Nation	Player
22	GK	(Malta) MLT	Saviour Darmanin (from Valletta)
16	DF	(Malta) MLT	Clive Brincat (from St. George's)
18	DF	(Malta) MLT	Arnold Buttigieg (from St. Patrick)
6	DF	(Malta) MLT	Brian Said (from Sliema Wanderers)
25	MF	(Malta) MLT	Christian Cassar (from Floriana)
21	MF	(Malta) MLT	Claude Mattocks (from Valletta)
9	FW	(Argentina) ARG	Julio Alcorsé (on loan from Hibernians)
15	FW	(Malta) MLT	Mark Barbara (on loan from Valletta)
19	FW	(Brazil) BRA	Marcelo Pereira (from Mqabba)
10	FW	(Malta) MLT	André Schembri (loan return from (Germany) Eintracht Braunschweig)

Out: Note: Flags indicate national team as defined under FIFA eligibility rules; some limited exceptions apply. Players may hold more than one non-FIFA nationality.

No.	Pos.	Nation	Player
1	GK	(Malta) MLT	Reuben Gauci (on loan to Qormi)
14	DF	(Malta) MLT	Charlo Magro (Retired)
27	DF	(Malta) MLT	Shawn Tellus (on loan to Qormi)
—	MF	(Malta) MLT	Gordon Mizzi (on loan to Gzira United)
18	MF	(Malta) MLT	Jamie Pace (to Valletta)
26	FW	(Malta) MLT	Cleavon Frendo (to Valletta)
10	FW	(Montenegro) MNE	Aleksandar Madžar (to Floriana)
10	FW	(Malta) MLT	André Schembri (on loan to (Germany) Carl Zeiss Jena)

=== Msida Saint-Joseph ===
In: Note: Flags indicate national team as defined under FIFA eligibility rules; some limited exceptions apply. Players may hold more than one non-FIFA nationality.

No.	Pos.	Nation	Player
—	GK	(Malta) MLT	Dwayne Carabott (from St. Lucia)
—	DF	(Malta) MLT	Jacques Scerri (from Pembroke)
—	MF	(Malta) MLT	Chris Camilleri (from Nadur Youngsters)
—	MF	(Malta) MLT	Lee Grima (from Qormi)
—	MF	(Malta) MLT	Kurt Magro (on loan from Valletta)
—	MF	(Malta) MLT	Elliott Navarro (from Mqabba)
—	MF	(Brazil) BRA	André Rocha da Silva (from Sliema Wanderers)
—	FW	(Brazil) BRA	Marcos Aurelio (from Unknown)

Out: Note: Flags indicate national team as defined under FIFA eligibility rules; some limited exceptions apply. Players may hold more than one non-FIFA nationality.

No.	Pos.	Nation	Player
4	DF	(Malta) MLT	Patrick Borg (loan return to Birkirkara)
16	DF	(Malta) MLT	Clive Brincat (loan return to St. George's)
21	DF	(Malta) MLT	Pio Sciriha (to Tarxien Rainbows)
3	DF	(Malta) MLT	Clive Spiteri (loan return to Valletta)
11	MF	(Malta) MLT	Roderick Baldacchino (to Birzebbuga St. Peters)
—	MF	(Malta) MLT	Lee Grima (to St. George's)
6	MF	(Malta) MLT	Glenn Magri (loan return to Naxxar Lions)
17	MF	(Malta) MLT	Lydon Micallef (on loan to Rabat Ajax)
9	FW	(Malta) MLT	Gilbert Camilleri (loan return to Naxxar Lions)
30	FW	(Lebanon) LBN	Gilberto dos Santos (released)
10	FW	(Malta) MLT	Lawrence Mizzi (released)
25	FW	(Cameroon) CMR	Njongo Priso (to Valletta)

=== Qormi ===
In: Note: Flags indicate national team as defined under FIFA eligibility rules; some limited exceptions apply. Players may hold more than one non-FIFA nationality.

No.	Pos.	Nation	Player
28	GK	(Malta) MLT	Reuben Gauci (on loan from Marsaxlokk)
2	DF	(Malta) MLT	Renie Forace (on loan from Valletta)
6	DF	(Malta) MLT	Massimo Grima (on loan from Valletta)
5	DF	(Brazil) BRA	Ramon (from Unknown)
15	DF	(Malta) MLT	Roderick Sammut (from Birkirkara)
13	DF	(Malta) MLT	Shawn Tellus (on loan from Marsaxlokk)
19	MF	(Brazil) BRA	Ivan (from Unknown)
—	MF	(Malta) MLT	Adrian Ciantar (on loan from Birkirkara)
—	MF	(Malta) MLT	Joseph Farrugia (on loan from Sliema Wanderers)
17	MF	(Malta) MLT	Keith Fenech (on loan from Valletta)
16	MF	(Malta) MLT	Chucks Nwoko (from Sliema Wanderers)
10	FW	(Nigeria) NGA	Alfred Effiong (from Ħamrun Spartans)

Out: Note: Flags indicate national team as defined under FIFA eligibility rules; some limited exceptions apply. Players may hold more than one non-FIFA nationality.

No.	Pos.	Nation	Player
—	GK	(Malta) MLT	Joshua Galea (to Birkirkara)
—	DF	(Malta) MLT	Clyde Camoin (loan return to Floriana)
—	DF	(Malta) MLT	Mario Caruana (to Floriana)
—	DF	(Malta) MLT	Kurt Zammit (to Vittoriosa Stars)
—	MF	(Malta) MLT	Benoir Fenech (to St. George's)
—	MF	(Malta) MLT	Lee Grima (to Msida Saint-Joseph)
—	FW	(Malta) MLT	Bjorn Dalli (released)

=== Sliema Wanderers ===
In: Note: Flags indicate national team as defined under FIFA eligibility rules; some limited exceptions apply. Players may hold more than one non-FIFA nationality.

No.	Pos.	Nation	Player
12	GK	(Malta) MLT	Simon Agius (on loan from Floriana)
33	DF	(Malta) MLT	Clifon Ciantar (loan return from Floriana)
15	DF	(Malta) MLT	Clifford Gatt Baldacchino (loan return from Mqabba)
—	MF	(Costa Rica) CRC	Victor Coto (from Unknown)
23	MF	(Malta) MLT	John Mintoff (loan return from Mqabba)
—	MF	(Australia) AUS	Daniel Severino (from (Australia) Bankstown City Lions)
9	FW	(Serbia) SRB	Kosta Bjedov (from (Slovakia) MFK Košice)

Out: Note: Flags indicate national team as defined under FIFA eligibility rules; some limited exceptions apply. Players may hold more than one non-FIFA nationality.

No.	Pos.	Nation	Player
22	GK	(Nigeria) NGA	Murphy Akanji (released)
4	DF	(Malta) MLT	Brian Said (to Marsaxlokk)
—	MF	(Malta) MLT	Joseph Farrugia (on loan to Qormi)
15	MF	(Malta) MLT	Chucks Nwoko (to Qormi)
9	MF	(Brazil) BRA	André Rocha da Silva (to Msida Saint-Joseph)
18	FW	(Malta) MLT	Orosco Anonam (to Floriana)
46	FW	(Malta) MLT	Etienne Barbara (to (Germany) SC Verl)
—	FW	(Brazil) BRA	Duda (released)

=== Tarxien Rainbows ===
In: Note: Flags indicate national team as defined under FIFA eligibility rules; some limited exceptions apply. Players may hold more than one non-FIFA nationality.

No.	Pos.	Nation	Player
—	DF	(Montenegro) MNE	Ivan Čarapić (from (Montenegro) FK Budućnost Podgorica)
—	DF	(Malta) MLT	Lino Galea (from Birkirkara)
—	DF	(Malta) MLT	Pio Sciriha (from Msida Saint-Joseph)
—	DF	(Malta) MLT	Mark Tanti (from St. Patrick)
—	MF	(Malta) MLT	Kevin Borg (on loan from Ħamrun Spartans)
—	MF	(Argentina) ARG	Rodrigo Cariaga (from (Argentina) Atlético Policial)
—	FW	(Malta) MLT	Warren Chircop (from Marsa)
—	FW	(Brazil) BRA	Daniel Mariano Bueno (from (Czech Republic) SK Sigma Olomouc)

Out: Note: Flags indicate national team as defined under FIFA eligibility rules; some limited exceptions apply. Players may hold more than one non-FIFA nationality.

No.	Pos.	Nation	Player
—	DF	(Malta) MLT	Graham Bencini (retired)
—	MF	(Nigeria) NGA	Essien Mbong (to San Gwann)
—	FW	(Malta) MLT	Angus Buhagiar (loan return to Floriana)

=== Valletta ===
In: Note: Flags indicate national team as defined under FIFA eligibility rules; some limited exceptions apply. Players may hold more than one non-FIFA nationality.

No.	Pos.	Nation	Player
6	DF	(Malta) MLT	Luke Dimech (from (England) Macclesfield Town)
—	DF	(Malta) MLT	Clive Spiteri (loan return from Msida Saint-Joseph)
11	MF	(Malta) MLT	Edmond Agius (from Hibernians)
18	MF	(Malta) MLT	Jamie Pace (from Marsaxlokk)
22	FW	(Malta) MLT	Cleavon Frendo (from Marsaxlokk)
15	FW	(Brazil) BRA	Marcelo Peabirú (from (Brazil) Cortiba)
25	FW	(Cameroon) CMR	Njongo Priso (from Msida Saint-Joseph)
—	FW	(Malta) MLT	Dylan Zarb (loan return from Mqabba)

Out: Note: Flags indicate national team as defined under FIFA eligibility rules; some limited exceptions apply. Players may hold more than one non-FIFA nationality.

No.	Pos.	Nation	Player
1	GK	(Malta) MLT	Saviour Darmanin (to Marsaxlokk)
11	DF	(Malta) MLT	Bryan Agius (loan return to Mosta)
—	DF	(Malta) MLT	Renie Forace (on loan to Qormi)
6	DF	(Malta) MLT	Massimo Grima (on loan to Qormi)
22	MF	(Germany) GER	Heiner Backhaus (to (Hong Kong) Kitchee)
—	MF	(Malta) MLT	Roberto Brincat (to Floriana)
8	MF	(Malta) MLT	Keith Fenech (on loan to Qormi)
16	MF	(Malta) MLT	Kurt Magro (on loan to Msida Saint-Joseph)
18	MF	(Malta) MLT	Claude Mattocks (to Marsaxlokk)
—	FW	(Malta) MLT	Mark Barbara (on loan to Marsaxlokk)
21	FW	(Argentina) ARG	Omar Sebastián Monesterolo (to (Cyprus) AEK Larnaca)
14	FW	(Nigeria) NGA	Frank Temile (to (Ukraine) FC Dynamo Kyiv)
—	FW	(Malta) MLT	Dylan Zarb (on loan to Floriana)

== See also ==
- (Belgium) List of Belgian football transfers summer 2008
- (Denmark) List of Danish football transfers summer 2008
- (Netherlands) List of Dutch football transfers summer 2008
- (England) List of English football transfers summer 2008
- (Germany) List of German football transfers summer 2008
- (Greece) List of Greek football transfers 2008-09
- (Italy) List of Italian football transfers summer 2008: July/August
- (Scotland) List of Scottish football transfers 2008-09
- (Spain) List of Spanish football transfers summer 2008
- (Turkey) List of Turkish football transfers 2008-09
