= 2007–08 Maltese FA Trophy =

Tournament details
- Country: Malta

Final positions
- Champions: Birkirkara (4th title)
- Runners-up: Hamrun Spartans

The 2007–08 Maltese FA Trophy (known as U*BET FA Trophy for sponsorship reasons) was the 70th season since its establishment. It featured 20 teams from Maltese Premier League and First Division. The competition started on 3 November 2007 and ended on 24 May 2008 with the final, which Birkirkara F.C. won 2–1 against Hamrun Spartans.

Hibernians were the defending champions, but were eliminated in the quarterfinals by Valletta.

== Calendar ==
| Round | Date | Matches | Clubs | New entries this round |
|---|---|---|---|---|
| First round | 3,4,10,11 November 2007 | 8 | 20 → 12 | 16 |
| Second round | 1 March 2008 | 4 | 12 → 8 | none |
| Quarter-finals | 12 April 2008 | 4 | 8 → 4 | 4 |
| Semi-finals | 19 May 2008 | 2 | 4 → 2 | none |
| Final | 24 May 2008 | 1 | 2 → 1 | none |

== Results ==
When the draw was conducted four teams received a bye to the Quarterfinals. Hibernians received a bye because they won the 2006–07 Maltese FA Trophy. Other three teams who received a bye directly to the Quarterfinals were Birkirkara, Marsaxlokk and Sliema Wanderers, for being three best-placed teams in previous year's Premier League.

=== First round ===
In the first round entered Premier League teams placed 4th to 10th and 10 First Division teams. The matches were played on 3, 4, 10 and 11 November 2007.

| Team 1 | Score | Team 2 |
|---|---|---|
3 November 2007
| Valletta | 4–0 | St. Patrick |
| St. George's | 2–3 | Pietà Hotspurs |
4 November 2007
| Mqabba | 3–2 | Vittoriosa |
| Mosta | 0–2 | Hamrun Spartans |
10 November 2007
| Qormi | 1–5 | Tarxien Rainbows |
| Marsa | 0–7 | Dingli Swallows |
11 November 2007
| Floriana | 7–1 | Mellieha |
| Senglea Athletic | 4–3 (a.e.t.) | Msida St. Joseph |

=== Second round ===
In this round entered winners from the previous round. The matches were played on 1 and 2 March 2008

| Team 1 | Score | Team 2 |
|---|---|---|
1 March 2008
| Hamrun Spartans | 1–0 | Pietà Hotspurs |
| Valletta | 5–0 | Tarxien Rainbows |
2 March 2008
| Mqabba | 0–1 | Dingli Swallows |
| Floriana | 3–2 (a.e.t.) | Senglea Athletic |

=== Quarter-finals ===
In this round entered the winners from the previous round and the four teams that had received a bye. The matches were played on 12 and 13 April 2008.

Dingli Swallows was the only team from the First Division. They played against Hamrun Spartans and lost 3-1. The other three ties were all contested between Premier League teams. They all finished 2-1 in favour of Valletta, Floriana and Birkirkara who beat Hibernians, Sliema Wanderers and Marsaxlokk respectively. Hibernians were the defending champions.

| 12 April 2008 | Hamrun Spartans | 3–1 | Dingli Swallows | Ta' Qali |
| 15:00 | Spiteri 30', 53', 90' | Report | J. Agius 19' | Stadium: Ta' Qali National Stadium; Referee: Anton Zammit (MFA) |

| 12 April 2008 | Hibernians | 1–2 | Valletta | Ta' Qali |
| 17:00 | Scerri 67' | Report | Temile 45'; G. Agius 87' | Stadium: Ta' Qali National Stadium; Referee: Adrian Azzopardi (MFA) |

| 13 April 2008 | Floriana | 2–1 | Sliema Wanderers | Ta' Qali |
| 15:00 | R. Darmanin 61'; M. Micallef 65' | Report | E. Barbara 51' | Stadium: Ta' Qali National Stadium; Referee: Adrian Casha (MFA) |

| 13 April 2008 | Marsaxlokk | 1–2 | Birkirkara | Ta' Qali |
| 17:00 | C. Mamo 1' | Report | Sylla 52'; Mifsud Triganza 70' | Stadium: Ta' Qali National Stadium; Referee: Marco Borg (MFA) |

=== Semi-finals ===
The winners from the Quarterfinals entered the Semifinals. The matches were played on 19 and 20 May 2008.

Both semifinals finished 4-2 in favour of Hamrun Spartans, who beat Floriana, and Birkirkara, who beat Valletta.

| 19 May 2008 | Hamrun Spartans | 4–2 | Floriana | Ta' Qali |
| 17:00 | S. Meilak 25'; A. Effiong 29'; Spiteri 33'; R. Fenech 75' (pen.) | Report | M. Brincat 45'; R. Darmanin 64' | Stadium: Ta' Qali National Stadium; Referee: Chris Lautier (MFA) |

| 20 May 2008 | Birkirkara | 4–2 | Valletta | Ta' Qali |
| 17:00 | Sylla 42', 51'; A. Tabone 61'; G. Mallia 68' | Report | Monesterolo 19'; J. Mifsud 73' | Stadium: Ta' Qali National Stadium; Referee: Joe Attard (MFA) |

=== Final ===
The final was played on 24 May and was contested between Birkirkara and Hamrun Spartans. Michael Galea opened the scoring for Birkirkara but Hamrun Spartans levelled matters through Ryan Fenech but Michael Galea scored his 2nd to give Birkirkara the trophy.

24 May 2008
17:00

| Birkirkara | 2–1 | Hamrun Spartans |
|---|---|---|
| M. Galea 58', 90' | Report | R. Fenech 65' |

Ta' Qali National Stadium, Ta' Qali
Referee: Anton Zammit (MFA)

| Birkirkara | Hamrun Spartans |

== Top scorers ==
| Rank | Player | Club | Goals |
|---|---|---|---|
| 1 | (Malta) Gaetan Spiteri | Hamrun Spartans | 5 |
| 2 | (Nigeria) Uchenna Anyanwu | Dingli Swallows | 4 |
| 2 | (Democratic Republic of the Congo) Yannick Bolasie | Floriana | 4 |
| 4 | (Ivory Coast) Amed Davy Sylla | Birkirkara | 3 |
| 4 | (Nigeria) Anthony Ewurum | Senglea Athletic | 3 |
| 4 | (Nigeria) Frank Temile | Valletta | 3 |
| 4 | (Argentina) Omar Sebastián Monesterolo | Valletta | 3 |
