= Alex Muscat =

Maltese footballer

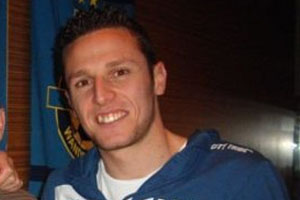

Personal information
- Full name: Alexander Muscat
- Date of birth: 14 December 1984 (age 41)
- Place of birth: Pietà, Malta
- Height: 6 ft 0 in (1.83 m)
- Position: Defender

Senior career*
Years	Team	Apps	(Gls)
2002–2003	Lija Athletic	18	(0)
2003–2004	Balzan Youths	22	(1)
2004–2019	Sliema Wanderers	227	(26)
Total		267	(27)

International career
2002	Malta U19	1	(0)
2003–2006	Malta U21	11	(0)
2004–2017	Malta	36	(0)
- * Club domestic league appearances and goals

Alexander Muscat (born 14 December 1984 in Pietà, Malta) is a retired professional footballer who played as a defender.

== Playing career ==
=== Lija Athletic ===
Muscat began his career as a trainee with Lija Athletic during the 2002–03 season. He made 18 appearances as he helped Lija Athletic to a 5th-place finish in the Maltese First Division.

=== Balzan Youths ===
Alex joined Balzan Youths for the 2003–04 season. The right back showed the rest of league he was more than capable of playing in the Maltese Premier League on a regular basis, and was even called up to the Maltese national team, during the season Alex made 22 appearances and scored one goal, but Balzan Youths were relegated to the Maltese First Division after finishing in 9th position.

=== Sliema Wanderers ===
Alex joined Maltese Premier League side Sliema Wanderers in 2004 and helped his new team to the title for the 2004–05 season. In his first season Alex made 22 appearances and scored two goals, he was also voted as most promising player at the Malta Football Awards that year.

In his second season with Sliema Wanderers, Alex made 24 appearances and scored one goal, as Sliema Wanderers finished as runners up in the Maltese Premier League, Alex was also involved in winning the Euro Challenge cup with Sliema Wanderers for the 2005–06 season.

During the 2006–07 season, Alex continued at right back for Sliema Wanderers and helped the club to another runners up place, but this time Sliema Wanderers were well off the pace as they finished 11 points away from champions Marsaxlokk. Alex made 20 appearances and scored four goals.

For the 2007–08 season, Muscat hoped to bring the Maltese Premier League title back to Sliema Wanderers, however the club finished in a disappointing 4th place, with Alex making 21 appearances and scoring two goals.

Season 2008–09 was a very important one for Alex as he was chosen for the National Team under the guidance of Dusan Fitzel and continued to be an integral part of the team under the new coach John Buttigieg. He helped Sliema Wanderers to another 4th-place finish, making 27 appearances and scoring five goals in the process, he also scored three important goals and won the U*BET FA Trophy two of which in the final against Valletta.

In August 2009, he scored the winner in the 2009 BOV Super Cup Trophy against Hibernians at the Ta' Qali National Stadium.

On 30 July 2019, Muscat announced his retirement from football due to a series of recurring knee injuries.

== Honours ==
=== Sliema Wanderers ===
Winner

- 2003–04 Maltese Premier League
- 2004, 2009 Maltese Cup
