= 2010–11 Maltese FA Trophy =

Tournament details
- Country: Malta

Final positions
- Champions: Floriana (19th title)
- Runners-up: Valletta

The 2010–11 Maltese FA Trophy was the 73rd season since its establishment. It will feature 21 teams from the Maltese Premier League, the First Division and the champions of the Gozo First Division. The competition began on 10 November 2010 and ended 22 May 2011 with the Final from Ta' Qali Stadium. The defending champions are Valletta, having won their 12th Maltese Cup last season and first since 2001. The winner will qualify to the second qualifying round of the 2011–12 UEFA Europa League.

Valletta were the defending champions, but lost in the Final to Floriana.

== Calendar ==
Matches will begin on 10 November 2010 and conclude with the final on 22 May 2011. For the second straight year, four teams will receive a bye directly into the quarterfinals.

Round	Date	Fixtures	New entrants	Venue
Preliminary Round	November 10, 2010	1	2	Centenary Stadium
First round	November 13 and 14, 2010	8	15	Victor Tedesco Stadium; Hibernians Ground; Centenary Stadium
Second Round	December 8, 2010	4	–	Ta' Qali National Stadium; Hibernians Ground
Quarterfinals	March 18 and 19, 2011	4	4	Ta' Qali National Stadium; Hibernians Ground
Semifinals	May 14 and 15, 2011	2	–	Ta' Qali National Stadium
Final	May 22, 2011	1	–	Ta' Qali National Stadium

== Preliminary round ==
Entering this round were two clubs from the Maltese First Division. This match took place on 10 November 2010.

Team 1	Score	Team 2
10 November 2010
Pietà Hotspurs	6–0	Msida St. Joseph

== First round ==
Entering this round was the winner from the preliminary round along with the six Maltese Premier League clubs which finished last season between 5th and 10th place in the league, the remaining eight clubs from the First Division and the reigning Gozo First Division champions. These matches took place from 12 to 14 November 2010.

Team 1	Score	Team 2
12 November 2010
Lija Athletic	0–3	Floriana
Marsaxlokk	1–0	Mqabba
Dingli Swallows	3–5 (a.e.t.)	Mosta
Ħamrun Spartans	5–0	Melita
13 November 2010
Hibernians	4–0	Pietà Hotspurs
Balzan Youths	1–3	Tarxien Rainbows
14 November 2010
St. George's	1–2	St. Andrews
Victoria Hotspurs	2–4	Vittoriosa Stars

== Second round ==
Entering this round were the eight winners from the first round. These matches took place on 19 January 2011.

Team 1	Score	Team 2
19 January 2011
Marsaxlokk	0–3	Vittoriosa Stars
Floriana	1–0 (a.e.t.)	Mosta
Ħamrun Spartans	2–3 (a.e.t.)	Tarxien Rainbows
Hibernians	3–2	St. Andrews

== Quarter-finals ==
Entering this round were the four winners from the second round along with the best four clubs from last year's Premier League competition.

19 March 2011	Sliema Wanderers	3–3 (a.e.t.) (1–3 p)	Birkirkara	Ta' Qali
14:00 CET	Triganza 4', 69'; Barbara 113'		Vukanac 45'; Babatunde 55'; Galea 118'	Stadium: Ta' Qali National Stadium

19 March 2011	Valletta	1–0 (a.e.t.)	Hibernians	Ta' Qali
16:00 CET	Denni 99'			Stadium: Ta' Qali National Stadium

20 March 2011	Vittoriosa Stars	2–4	Tarxien Rainbows	Paola
14:00 CET	Luis 26' (pen.); Jorge 90' (pen.)		Ricardo Costa 45' (pen.), 73'; Everton (yellow card) 54' (yellow-red card) 90+2'; Critien 63'; Bueno 80'	Stadium: Hibernians Ground

20 March 2011	Qormi	1–1 (a.e.t.) (3–5 p)	Floriana	Paola
16:00 CET	Vandelannoite 71'; Vandelannoite (red card) 72'		Borg 58'; Saïdi (red card) 97'	Stadium: Hibernians Ground

== Semi-finals ==
Entering this round were the four winners from the Quarterfinals.

14 May 2011	Tarxien Rainbows	0–1 (a.e.t.)	Valletta	Ta' Qali
17:00 CET	Mintoff (red card) 120+2'		Denni 116'	Stadium: Ta' Qali National Stadium

15 May 2011	Birkirkara	1–2	Floriana	Ta' Qali
17:00 CET	Cilia 66' (pen.)		Caruana 23'; Farrugia 60'	Stadium: Ta' Qali National Stadium

== Final ==
The final played on 22 May 2011.

Valletta and Floriana have met together in Maltese FA Trophy final six times before, having previously met in 1957, 1960, 1976, 1977, 1978, and 1994. When meeting in the finals, Valletta won three times (1960, 1977 and 1978). Floriana won three Times (1957, 1976, and 1994).

The last time Floriana and Valletta met together in the FA Trophy was the 2008–09 Quarter-finals when Valletta beat Floriana by 4–1 on penalties when the match ends 2–2 draw.

22 May 2011	Valletta	0–1	Floriana	Ta' Qali
17:00 CET			Woods 89'	Stadium: Ta' Qali National Stadium; Attendance: 8,405; Referee: Paul Caruana
