= Ivan Woods =

Maltese footballer

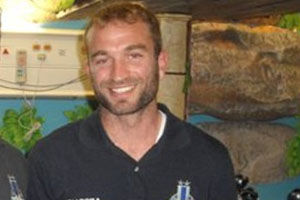
- Woods in 2010

Personal information
- Date of birth: 31 December 1976 (age 49)
- Place of birth: Toronto, Ontario, Canada
- Height: 1.70 m (5 ft 7 in)
- Position: Striker

Youth career
- Attard

Senior career*
Years	Team	Apps	(Gls)
1994–1999	Valletta	65	(11)
1998–1999	→Sliema Wanderers (loan)	20	(10)
1999–2005	Pietà Hotspurs	114	(48)
2005–2010	Sliema Wanderers	141	(71)
2010–2012	Floriana	54	(15)
2012–2014	Sliema Wanderers	50	(15)

International career^{‡}
- Malta U16
- Malta U18
	Malta U21	8	(4)
2003–2011	Malta	47	(1)
- * Club domestic league appearances and goals as of 18 September 2015 ‡ National team caps and goals as of 30 August 2010

Ivan Woods (born 31 December 1976) is a former professional footballer. Born in Canada, he represented the Malta national team.

== Playing career ==
=== Valletta ===
Woods began his career playing for Attard, but following some impressive displays he was signed by Valletta for the 1994–95 season. Woods made seven appearances in his debut season for Valletta, but failed to score any goals, as Valletta finished in third position in the Maltese Premier League.

Woods began the 1995–96 season with Valletta, hoping to force his way into the first team squad. During the season, he made 11 appearances, and scored two goals, to help his team to a second-place finish in the Maltese Premier League.

For the 1996–97 season, he made 18 appearances, and scored five goals, as Valletta finished the season as champions in the Maltese Premier League.

Hoping to gain more silverware during the 1997–98 season, Woods went on to make 22 appearances and score four goals, as Valletta retained the Maltese Premier League title.

Woods returned to Valletta for the 1999–00 season, and went on to make seven appearances, but failed to score any goals during the season.

=== Sliema Wanderers ===
Following a good run of form, Woods joined Sliema Wanderers on loan for the 1998–99 season. He went on to make 20 appearances and score an impressive ten goals, as Sliema Wanderers finished in third position in the Maltese Premier League.

=== Pietà Hotspurs ===
Woods joined Pietà Hotspurs during the January transfer window of the 1999–00 season. In his first season with the club, he made 16 appearances, scoring three goals, as his new club recorded a fifth-place finish in the Maltese Premier League.

In his first full season with Pietà Hotspurs, Woods made 20 appearances and scored 11 goals during the 2000–01 season, as Pietà Hotspurs finished in seventh position in the relegation group, to retain the top flight status.

Woods hoped he could help Pietà Hotspurs back into the championship pool for the 2001–02 season, but the club finished in exactly the same position as the previous one, with ietà Hotspurs in seventh position in relegation pool and again narrowly avoiding relegation, during the season he made 15 appearances and scored three goals.

For the 2002–03 season, Woods made 27 appearances and scored nine goals, as Pietà Hotspurs improved on their previous two seasons, with a fifth-place finish in the Maltese Premier League. Woods received his first call up for the Maltese national football team, following a string of fine performances.

Woods went into the 2003–04 season, making 23 appearances and contributing with ten goals, as Pietà Hotspurs again finished in fifth position in the Maltese Premier League.

With Woods in great goalscoring form, he was in high demand, and went into the 2004–05 season hoping to help Pietà Hotspurs to a higher league position. However, Woods left the club during the January transfer window of 2005. During the course of the season he made 13 appearances and scored a 12 goals, which helped Pietà Hotspurs eventually finish in seventh position.

=== Sliema Wanderers ===
Woods moved from Pietà Hotspurs to Sliema Wanderers during the January transfer window of 2005, and had instant success, as Sliema Wanderers won the Maltese Premier League title for the 2004–05 season. During the season, Ivan made 14 appearances and scored eight goals.

The 2005–06 was Woods first full season with Sliema Wanderers, and although the club finished in second position in the Maltese Premier League, he made 28 appearances and scored 16 goals.

For the 2006–07 season, Woods made 26 appearances and scored 20 goals, but Sliema Wanderers again finished in second position in the Maltese Premier League, some way behind eventual champions Marsaxlokk, who won the title by an 11-point gap.

Woods and Sliema Wanderers went into the 2007–08 season, hoping to go one better and win the Maltese Premier League, however the club finish one worse than the previous season with a third-place finish, with Woods making 22 appearances and scoring ten goals.

For the 2008–09 season, Woods and Sliema Wanderers finished in a disappointing fifth position in the Maltese Premier League, with Woods making 26 appearances and contributing with nine goals.

Woods went into the 2009–10 season as the captain of Sliema Wanderers. Woods helped lead the club to a fourth-place finish under the guidance of new manager Mark Marlow. Sliema Wanderers also went on to beat Qormi in the Europa league play-off, Woods made 25 appearances and scored eight goals during the season.

=== Floriana ===
Following weeks of speculation, Ivan Woods was confirmed as a Floriana player on 30 August 2010. During his first season with Floriana, the latter finished 2nd in the Maltese Premier League and won the Maltese Cup against eternal rivals Valletta, winning 1–0, the goal scored by Ivan from a direct freekick in the 89th minute.

== International career ==
=== International goals ===
#	Date	Venue	Opponent	Score	Result	Competition
1.	17 August 2005	Ta' Qali Stadium, Ta' Qali, Malta	Northern Ireland	1–1	1–1	Friendly

== Honours ==
=== Club ===
Valletta

- Maltese Premier League (3): 1996–97, 1997–98, 1998–99
- FA Trophy (3): 1994–95, 1995–96, 1996–97

Sliema Wanderers

- Maltese Premier League (1): 2004–05
- FA Trophy (1): 2008–09

Floriana

- FA Trophy (1): 2010–11
