= Adrian Ciantar =

Maltese footballer

Personal information
- Full name: Adrian Ciantar
- Date of birth: 9 August 1978 (age 48)
- Place of birth: Malta
- Position: Midfielder

Senior career*
Years	Team	Apps	(Gls)
1996–1997	St. Patrick	16	(1)
1997–2003	Hibernians	144	(14)
2003–2009	Birkirkara	88	(9)
2008–2009	→ Qormi (loan)	17	(0)

International career^{‡}
1994–1995	Malta U16	12	(0)
1997–1999	Malta U21	10	(0)
2000	Malta	5	(0)
- * Club domestic league appearances and goals as of 3 September 2009 ‡ National team caps and goals as of 3 September 2009

Adrian Ciantar (born 9 August 1978 in Malta) is a retired footballer.

== Club career ==
Ciantar made his debut with Hibernians in the Maltese Premier League in the season 1997–1998. In the season 2003-2004 he joined Birkirkara. He has played with the Maltese national football team.

== International career ==
Cianatr made his debut for Malta in a January 2000 friendly match against Qatar, coming on as a 73rd-minute substitute for Gilbert Agius, and earned a total of 5 caps (no goals). His final international was in June that same year, against England.
