= Josef Mifsud =

Maltese footballer (born 1984)

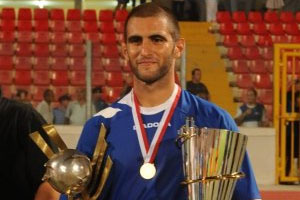

Personal information
- Date of birth: 7 September 1984 (age 42)
- Place of birth: Sliema, Malta
- Height: 6 ft 0 in (1.83 m)
- Position: Defender

Youth career
- Sliema Wanderers

Senior career*
| Years | Team | Apps | (Gls) |
| 2001–2003 | Sliema Wanderers | 3 | (0) |
| 2002–2003 | → Lija Athletic (loan) | | |
| 2003–2007 | Msida Saint-Joseph | 91 | (0) |
| 2007–2009 | Valletta | 39 | (2) |
| 2009– | Sliema Wanderers | 90 | (4) |
| 2013–2014 | → Tarxien Rainbows (loan) | 28 | (0) |
| 2014–2015 | Gżira United | 20 | (2) |

International career^{‡}
- Malta U16
- Malta U21
| 2007–2008 | Malta | 6 | (0) |
- * Club domestic league appearances and goals as of 18 July 2020 ‡ National team caps and goals as of 17 June 2009

Josef Mifsud (born 7 September 1984 in Sliema, Malta) is a former professional footballer and an accredited physical education teacher. As a footballer, he played as a defender.

== Playing career ==
=== Sliema Wanderers ===
Mifsud began his career in the Sliema Wanderers youth team before making his senior debut during the 2001–02 season. He made two appearances that season but did not score, as Sliema Wanderers finished third in the Maltese Premier League.

In the 2002–03 season, he made one more appearance but again failed to find the net, though Sliema Wanderers went on to win the league title. Struggling to secure a regular spot in the team, Mifsud was loaned to Lija Athletic to gain first-team experience.

Overall, during his time with Sliema Wanderers, he made three appearances but did not score any goals.

Msida Saint-Joseph

In the summer of 2003, Josef Mifsud moved to Msida Saint-Joseph in a bid to play more first team football, he began the 2003–04 season slotting into the Msida Saint-Joseph defence well and made 17 appearances, but failed to score any goals, as Msida Saint-Joseph narrowly avoided relegation finishing 8th in the Maltese Premier League.

Mifsud established himself firmly as a first team regular for the 2004–05 season, making 23 appearances, but again failing to score. His contribution helped Msida Saint-Joseph to another 8th-place finish as the club avoided relegation once again.

With the profile of Josef rising, he entered the 2005–06 season hoping to gain a mid table finish with Msida Saint-Joseph, and get them away from the dreaded relegation group, and he managed to do so, as Msida Saint-Joseph finished in the championship group, in 6th position. During the season Josef made 24 appearances, without finding the net.

Mifsud hoped to build on an impressive season with Msida Saint-Joseph, and continued to perform with a string of fine performances for Msida Saint-Joseph, as the club again finished in the championship group, in 6th position, with Mifsud making 27 appearances and again failing to score. Josef's performances didn't go unnoticed and was given his chance to play for the Maltese national team and made his debut in 2007.

Mifsud played for Msida Saint-Joseph for four seasons and in total made 91 appearances, but failed to score any goals.

=== Valletta ===
With Josef being branded as one of the best home grown defenders in the Maltese Premier League, he joined Valletta in the summer of 2007, for the 2007–08 season, Mifsud made 25 appearances and scored two goals, as Valletta won the Maltese Premier League title.

For the 2008–09 season, first-team chances diminished in his second season, mainly down to the signing of Luke Dimech, Mifsud made 13 appearances during the season, but failed to find the net as Valletta missed out on the title to Hibernians.

During his time with Valletta, Josef made 38 appearances and scored his first two goals in the Maltese Premier League.

=== Sliema Wanderers ===
In June, 2009, Sliema Wanderers announced their first signing of the close season, securing the services of the Valletta defender Josef Mifsud, with the player signing a five-year contract.

Mifsud made his Premier League debut for Sliema Wanderers on 30 August 2009 in a 1–0 defeat to Qormi.

== International career ==
=== Malta ===
Josef Mifsud made his international debut for Malta during his time as a Msida Saint-Joseph player. He was used in a friendly match against Armenia on 12 September 2007, however Malta lost the match 1–0.

== Honours ==
=== Sliema Wanderers ===
- Maltese Premier League winner: 2002–03

=== Valletta ===
- Maltese Premier League winner: 2007–08

== Career statistics ==
Statistics accurate as of match played 1 August 2013.

| Club performance | | | League | | Cup | | League Cup | | Continental | | Total | |
| Season | Club | League | Apps | Goals | Apps | Goals | Apps | Goals | Apps | Goals | Apps | Goals |
| Malta | | | League | | Maltese Cup | | League Cup | | Europe | | Total | |
|---|---|---|---|---|---|---|---|---|---|---|---|---|
| 2001–02 | Sliema Wanderers | Maltese Premier League | 2 | 0 | 0 | 0 | 0 | 0 | 0 | 0 | 2 | 0 |
| 2002–03 | Sliema Wanderers | Maltese Premier League | 1 | 0 | 0 | 0 | 0 | 0 | 0 | 0 | 1 | 0 |
| 2003–04 | Msida Saint-Joseph | Maltese Premier League | 17 | 0 | 0 | 0 | 0 | 0 | 0 | 0 | 17 | 0 |
| 2004–05 | Msida Saint-Joseph | Maltese Premier League | 23 | 0 | 0 | 0 | 0 | 0 | 0 | 0 | 23 | 0 |
| 2005–06 | Msida Saint-Joseph | Maltese Premier League | 24 | 0 | 0 | 0 | 0 | 0 | 0 | 0 | 24 | 0 |
| 2006–07 | Msida Saint-Joseph | Maltese Premier League | 27 | 0 | 0 | 0 | 0 | 0 | 0 | 0 | 27 | 0 |
| 2007–08 | Valletta | Maltese Premier League | 25 | 2 | 0 | 0 | 0 | 0 | 0 | 0 | 25 | 2 |
| 2008–09 | Valletta | Maltese Premier League | 13 | 0 | 0 | 0 | 0 | 0 | 2 | 0 | 15 | 0 |
| 2009–10 | Sliema Wanderers | Maltese Premier League | 25 | 0 | 1 | 0 | 0 | 0 | 1 | 0 | 26 | 0 |
| 2010–11 | Sliema Wanderers | Maltese Premier League | 19 | 2 | 1 | 0 | 0 | 0 | 0 | 0 | 20 | 2 |
| 2011–12 | Sliema Wanderers | Maltese Premier League | 27 | 1 | 1 | 0 | 0 | 0 | 0 | 0 | 27 | 1 |
| 2012–13 | Sliema Wanderers | Maltese Premier League | 19 | 1 | 1 | 0 | 0 | 0 | 0 | 0 | 19 | 1 |
| Total | Malta | | 223 | 6 | 4 | 0 | 0 | 0 | 3 | 0 | 230 | 6 |
| Career total | | | 223 | 6 | 4 | 0 | 0 | 0 | 3 | 0 | 230 | 6 |
