= 2003–04 Maltese Premier League =

Maltese Premier League
- Season: 2003–04
- Dates: 22 August 2003 – 9 May 2004
- Champions: Sliema Wanderers (25th title)
- Relegated: Balzan; Ħamrun Spartans
- Champions League: Sliema Wanderers
- UEFA Cup: Birkirkara; Marsaxlokk
- UEFA Intertoto Cup: Hibernians
- Matches played: 132
- Goals scored: 407 (3.08 per match)
- Top goalscorer: Danilo Dončić (19 goals)

The 2003–04 Maltese Premier League (known as the MIA Premier League for sponsorship reasons) was the 24th season of the Maltese Premier League, and the 89th season of top-tier football in Malta. The league started on 22 August 2003 and finished on 9 May 2004. Sliema Wanderers successfully defended last season's league triumph, equalling Floriana's league title record of 25 championships.

== Teams ==
Locations of the 2003–04 Maltese Premier League teams

The following teams were promoted from the First Division at the start of the season:

- Msida Saint-Joseph
- Balzan Youths

From the previous Premier League season, the following teams were relegated to the First Division:

- Marsa
- Mosta

== First phase ==
=== League table ===
Pos	Team	Pld	W	D	L	GF	GA	GD	Pts	Qualification
1	Sliema Wanderers	18	13	2	3	37	15	+22	41	Qualification for the Top Six
2	Birkirkara	18	11	2	5	41	18	+23	35	Qualification for the Top Six
3	Hibernians	18	10	4	4	31	25	+6	34	Qualification for the Top Six
4	Marsaxlokk	18	9	4	5	30	22	+8	31	Qualification for the Top Six
5	Floriana	18	7	6	5	33	26	+7	27	Qualification for the Top Six
6	Pietà Hotspurs	18	7	6	5	28	25	+3	27	Qualification for the Top Six
7	Valletta	18	6	5	7	27	29	−2	23	Qualification for the Play-out
8	Balzan	18	5	3	10	22	37	−15	18	Qualification for the Play-out
9	Msida Saint-Joseph	18	2	4	12	18	35	−17	10	Qualification for the Play-out
10	Ħamrun Spartans	18	0	4	14	11	46	−35	4	Qualification for the Play-out

Source: RSSSSF

=== Results ===
Home \ Away	BZN	BKR	FRN	HIB	ĦMR	MXK	MSD	PTA	SLM	VLT
Balzan	—	0–1	1–5	1–0	1–0	2–4	2–1	2–0	1–3	1–2
Birkirkara	3–0	—	0–2	2–4	3–0	3–2	0–0	5–1	0–1	4–1
Floriana	2–2	2–1	—	1–2	4–1	1–2	2–1	1–1	0–2	1–1
Hibernians	2–1	2–1	2–4	—	2–1	3–2	1–0	0–0	0–2	2–2
Ħamrun Spartans	1–1	0–6	1–1	1–2	—	0–1	0–2	0–3	0–3	2–2
Marsaxlokk	5–1	0–1	0–0	3–2	1–1	—	2–0	1–0	2–2	2–1
Msida Saint-Joseph	1–1	1–7	2–4	2–3	2–2	0–1	—	0–2	0–1	0–2
Pietà Hotspurs	2–1	2–3	1–1	2–1	4–0	1–1	1–1	—	0–3	3–3
Sliema Wanderers	4–2	0–1	4–1	0–0	4–0	2–1	1–4	1–3	—	1–0
Valletta	1–2	0–0	2–1	2–4	2–0	2–0	3–1	1–2	0–3	—

Source: RSSSF
Legend: Blue = home team win; Yellow = draw; Red = away team win.

== Second phase ==
=== Top Six ===
The teams placed in the first six positions in the league table qualified for the Top Six, and the points obtained during the first phase were halved (and rounded up) before the start of second phase. As a result, the teams started with the following points before the second phase: Sliema Wanderers 21 points, Birkirkara 18, Hibernians 17, Marsaxlokk 16, Floriana and Pietà Hotspurs 14.

Pos	Team	Pld	W	D	L	GF	GA	GD	Pts	Qualification	SLM	BKR	HIB	MXK	PTA	FRN
1	Sliema Wanderers (C)	10	7	1	2	24	12	+12	43	Qualification for the 2004–05 UEFA Champions League	—	2–2	3–1	3–1	2–1	4–1
2	Birkirkara	10	6	3	1	18	12	+6	39	Qualification for the 2004–05 UEFA Cup	2–1	—	3–1	1–3	1–1	2–0
3	Hibernians	10	6	0	4	16	13	+3	35	Qualification for the 2004 UEFA Intertoto Cup	3–0	0–1	—	0–3	1–0	3–1
4	Marsaxlokk	10	3	2	5	16	17	−1	27	Qualification for the 2004–05 UEFA Cup (Note: Marsaxlokk qualified to the 2004–05 UEFA Cup as losing finalists in the 2003–04 Maltese FA Trophy.)	0–2	3–4	1–4	—	0–0	0–0
5	Pietà Hotspurs	10	2	3	5	12	15	−3	23		1–5	1–1	0–1	2–0	—	2–3
6	Floriana	10	1	1	8	8	25	−17	18		0–2	0–1	1–2	1–5	1–4	—

Source: RSSSF
(C) Champions

=== Play-out ===
The teams which finished in the last four league positions were placed in the play-out and at the end of the phase the two lowest-placed teams were relegated to the First Division. The points obtained during the first phase were halved (and rounded up) before the start of second phase. As a result, the teams started with the following points before the second phase: Valletta 12 points, Balzan Youths 9, Msida Saint-Joseph 5 and Ħamrun Spartans 2.

Pos	Team	Pld	W	D	L	GF	GA	GD	Pts	Relegation	VLT	MSD	BZN	ĦMR
7	Valletta	6	5	0	1	14	4	+10	27		—	1–3	3–1	3–0
8	Msida Saint-Joseph	6	4	1	1	14	7	+7	22		0–1	—	2–1	3–3
9	Balzan (R)	6	2	0	4	6	14	−8	11	Relegation to the 2004–05 Maltese First Division	0–5	0–3	—	2–0
10	Ħamrun Spartans (R)	6	0	1	5	5	14	−9	3	Relegation to the 2004–05 Maltese First Division	0–1	1–3	1–2	—

Source: RSSSF
(R) Relegated

== Season statistics ==
=== Top scorers ===
Rank	Player	Club	Goals
1	(Serbia and Montenegro) Danilo Dončić	Sliema Wanderers	19
2	(Malta) Etienne Barbara	Marsaxlokk	15
3	(Malta) Michael Galea	Birkirkara	14
4	(Malta) Daniel Bogdanović	Sliema Wanderers/Marsxalokk	13
4	(Nigeria) Daniel Nwoke	Msida Saint-Joseph	13
6	(Malta) Gilbert Agius	Valletta	10
6	(Nigeria) Haruna Doda	Birkirkara	10
6	(Malta) Ivan Woods	Pietà Hotspurs	10
6	(Malta) Stefan Giglio	Sliema Wanderers	10
10	(Nigeria) Olumuyiwa Aganun	Msida Saint-Joseph	9
10	(Malta) Stefan Zahra	Balzan	9

=== Hat-tricks ===
Player	For	Against	Result	Date
(Nigeria) Daniel Nwoke	Msida Saint-Joseph	Sliema Wanderers	4–1	29 August 2003
(Malta) Michael Galea	Birkirkara	Msida Saint-Joseph	7–1	13 September 2003
(Malta) Etienne Barbara	Marsaxlokk	Balzan	4–2	10 October 2003
(Malta) Adrian Mifsud	Hibernians	Valletta	4–2	19 December 2003
(Serbia and Montenegro) Danilo Dončić	Sliema Wanderers	Pietà Hotspurs	3–0	7 February 2004
(Malta) Jonathan Holland	Floriana	Msida Saint-Joseph	4–2	8 February 2004
(Serbia and Montenegro) Danilo Dončić	Sliema Wanderers	Pietà Hotspurs	5–1	12 April 2004
(Malta) Ian Zammit	Valletta	Balzan	5–0	18 April 2004
(Malta) Daniel Bogdanović	Marsaxlokk	Floriana	5–1	29 April 2004

== Awards ==
=== Monthly awards ===
Month	Player of the Month	
Month	Player	Club
August/September	(Malta) Etienne Barbara	Floriana
October	(Malta) Gilbert Agius	Valletta
November	(Republic of the Congo) Daniel Dengaky	Ħamrun Spartans
December	(Malta) Gilbert Agius	Valletta
January	(Malta) Michael Mifsud	Sliema Wanderers
February	(Nigeria) Haruna Doda	Birkirkara
March	(Malta) Stefan Giglio	Sliema Wanderers
April	(Malta) Daniel Bogdanović	Marsaxlokk
May	(Malta) Stefan Giglio	Sliema Wanderers
