= Boris Sandjo =

Central African footballer

Personal information
- Full name: Boris Sandjo
- Date of birth: 22 May 1990 (age 36)
- Place of birth: Derbaki, Central African Republic
- Height: 6 ft 1 in (1.85 m)
- Position: Striker

Team information
- Current team: Derbaki Football Center 8
- Number: 16

Youth career
- 1999–2002: School of football of Central African Republic

Senior career*
Years	Team	Apps	(Gls)
2002–2003	AS Tempête Mocaf	17	
2004–2005	Sogéa FC	18	(16)
2005–	Derbaki Football Center 8	10	(16)
2007–2008	Birkirkara (loan)	1	(0)

International career
2003–	Central African Republic	11	(6)
- * Club domestic league appearances and goals

Boris Sandjo (born 22 May 1990) is a Central African Republic soccer player, who plays for Derbaki Football Center 8.

== Playing career ==
Sandjo plays as a striker.

=== Birkirkara ===
In the summer of 2007 he joined Birkirkara. Just six minutes into his debut game against Hibernians, he suffered a serious injury which would keep him out for the rest of the season. Because of that he was released so the club could sign a third foreigner - fellow Central African Republic player Marcelin Tamboulas.

Season	Team	Matches	Goals
1999–2002	School of football of Central African Republic	--	--
2002–2004	AS TEMPÊTE MOCAF of Bangui (1st Division of Central African rep.)	--	--
2004–2005	Sogéa FC (Gabon)	18	16
2005–2007	DFC8 of Bangui (1st division Central African rep.)	10	16
2007–2008	Birkirkara	1	0

== International career ==
He has played 11 matches scoring 6 with the senior National Team.
