= Atli Danielsen =

Faroese footballer (born 1983)

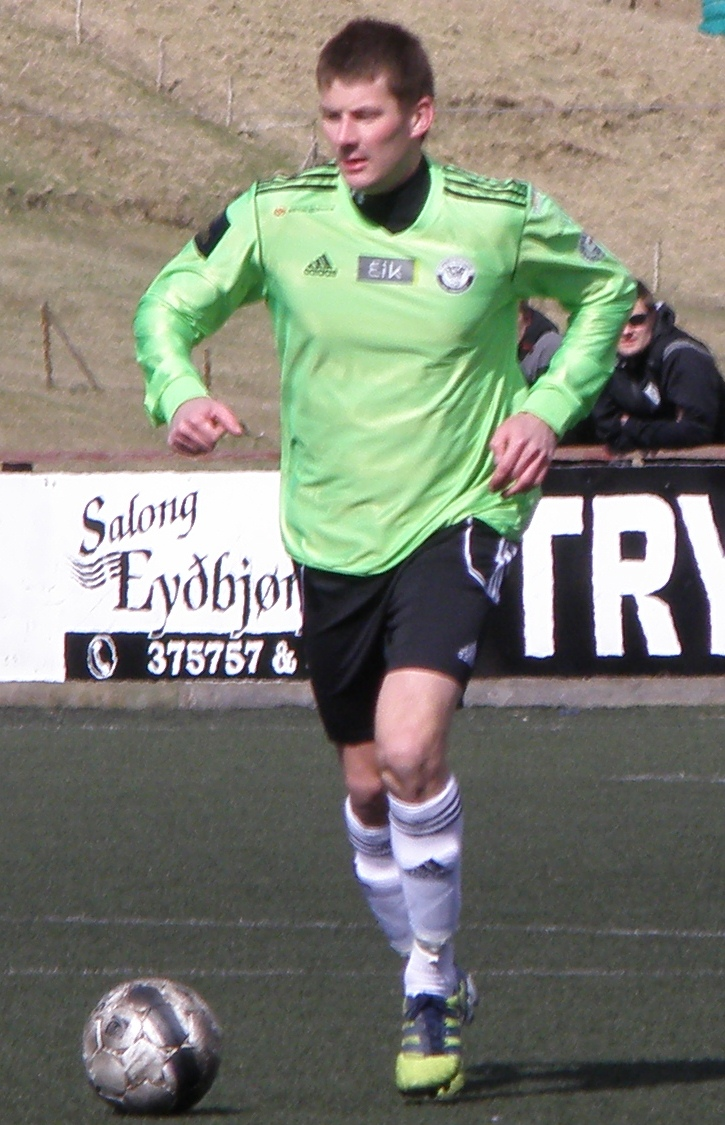

Personal information
- Full name: Atli Danielsen
- Date of birth: 15 August 1983 (age 43)
- Place of birth: Faroe Islands
- Height: 1.81 m (5 ft 11 in)
- Positions: Defender; midfielder

Team information
- Current team: KÍ Klaksvík
- Number: 8

Youth career
- KÍ Klaksvík

Senior career*
| Years | Team | Apps | (Gls) |
| 2000–2006 | KÍ Klaksvík | 130 | (24) |
| 2005 | →Sogndal Fotball (loan) | 2 | (0) |
| 2007–2009 | Boldklubben Frem | 60 | (3) |
| 2009 | KÍ Klaksvík | 13 | (2) |
| 2009–2011 | FC Roskilde | 38 | (2) |
| 2011–2012 | B36 Tórshavn | 27 | (1) |
| 2013– | KÍ Klaksvík | 63 | (9) |

International career^{‡}
| 2003– | Faroe Islands | 42 | (0) |
- * Club domestic league appearances and goals as of 18 November 2015 ‡ National team caps and goals as of 9 September 2011

Atli Danielsen (born 15 August 1983) is a Faroese footballer who currently plays for KÍ Klaksvík in the Premier League of the Faroe Islands.

== Club career ==
Danielsen started with KÍ Klaksvík, playing his first game in their 2000 league season. After he became a regular in the national team he was loaned to Norwegian side Sogndal before he signed for Danish outfit Boldklubben Frem. In the wintertransfer 2010, he signed FC Roskilde.

== International career ==
Danielsen is a regular in the Faroese national team. He made his debut in April 2003 in friendly match against Kazakhstan, coming on as a substitute for Hans Fróði Hansen.
