= Timo Paasolainen =

Finnish football coach and former footballer (born 1964)

Personal information
- Date of birth: 20 April 1964 (age 62)
- Place of birth: Utajärvi, Finland
- Height: 1.74 m (5 ft 9 in)
- Position: Midfielder

Youth career
- 1975–1983: Äänekosken Huima

Senior career*
Years	Team	Apps	(Gls)
1984–1987	Nastolan Nopsa		
1988–1989	Lappeenrannan Pallo	35	(5)
1990–1993	Joutsenon Kullervo	84	(7)
1993	Birkirkara	3	(0)
1994–1995	Joutsenon Kullervo	31	(1)
1996	Ilves	4	(0)

Managerial career
- 1998: MYPA (assistant)
- 2000–2003: Rakuunat
- 2005: Kuusankoski
- 2009–2010: MYPA (assistant)
- * Club domestic league appearances and goals

Timo Paasolainen (born 20 April 1964) is a Finnish football coach and a former footballer who played as a midfielder.

== Club career ==
Paasolainen started football in a youth sector of Äänekosken Huima. He started his senior career with Nastolan Nopsa in Nelonen and Kolmonen. In 1988 he joined Lappeenrannan Pallo in third-tier Kakkonen. During 1990–1995, he played for Joutsenon Kullervo in second-tier Ykkönen, and in 1993 he became the first Finnish player to play in Malta, when he had a brief stint with Birkirkara in Maltese Premier League. He ended his playing career in 1996, after making his debut in Veikkausliiga with Ilves. He totalled four appearances in the Finnish top tier.

== Coaching career ==
First Paasolainen started coaching the U19 team of MYPA in 1997. Next year he joined the coaching staff of MYPA first team in Veikkausliiga, with manager Juha Malinen. During 2000–2003, he served as the head coach of Rakuunat in Ykkönen, and continued to Kuusankoski in Kakkonen in 2005. Since 2007, Paasolainen worked as the coaching director of PEPO Lappeenranta youth sector. In 2009, he briefly returned to MYPA as an assistant coach to Janne Lindberg, also continuing to work at PEPO.

In October 2018, Paasolainen joined Dutch club Fortuna Sittard as U17 youth coach, also working at developing the club's individual coaching.

Most recently he worked in the organisation of Veikkausliiga club Inter Turku as a youth talent coach since 2020. Simultaneously he worked as a scout for Eredivisie club AFC Ajax. He announced his departure from Inter after the 2024 season.

== Personal life ==
Paasolainen is married and lives in Lappeenranta. He has previously worked as a physical education teacher in Luumäki.
