= 2007–08 Maltese Premier League =

Maltese Premier League
- Season: 2007–08
- Dates: 26 August 2007 – 16 May 2008
- Champions: Valletta (19th title)
- Relegated: Mqabba; Pietà Hotspurs
- Champions League: Valletta
- UEFA Cup: Marsaxlokk; Birkirkara
- UEFA Intertoto Cup: Hibernians
- Matches played: 132
- Goals scored: 416 (3.15 per match)
- Top goalscorer: Omar Sebastián Monesterolo (19 goals)
- Biggest home win: Valletta 7–0 Marsaxlokk (1 December 2017); Msida St. Joseph 7–0 Pietà Hotspurs (27 December 2017)
- Biggest away win: Mqabba 1–6 Pietà Hotspurs (20 October 2017)
- Highest scoring: Ħamrun Spartans 7–3 Marsaxlokk (30 December 2017)

The 2007–08 Maltese Premier League (known as the BOV Premier League for sponsorship reasons) was the 28th season of the Maltese Premier League, and the 93rd season of top-level league football in Malta. Valletta won their nineteenth league title overcoming last season's champions, Marsaxlokk.

== Teams ==
Locations of the 2007–08 Maltese Premier League teams

The following teams were promoted from the First Division at the start of the season:

- Mqabba
- Ħamrun Spartans

From the previous Premier League season, the following teams were relegated to the First Division:

- St. George's
- Marsa

== First phase ==
=== League table ===
Pos	Team	Pld	W	D	L	GF	GA	GD	Pts	Qualification
1	Valletta	18	10	6	2	40	16	+24	36	Qualification for the Top Six
2	Marsaxlokk	18	10	3	5	35	26	+9	33	Qualification for the Top Six
3	Sliema Wanderers	18	9	5	4	31	18	+13	32	Qualification for the Top Six
4	Floriana	18	8	4	6	33	28	+5	28	Qualification for the Top Six
5	Birkirkara	18	7	6	5	27	18	+9	27	Qualification for the Top Six
6	Ħamrun Spartans	18	7	6	5	30	29	+1	27	Qualification for the Top Six
7	Hibernians	18	6	7	5	22	19	+3	25	Qualification for the Play-out
8	Msida Saint-Joseph	18	6	3	9	25	35	−10	21	Qualification for the Play-out
9	Pietà Hotspurs	18	5	0	13	21	40	−19	15	Qualification for the Play-out
10	Mqabba	18	2	0	16	15	50	−35	6	Qualification for the Play-out

Source: RSSSF
Rules for classification: 1) Points; 2) Play-offs (only if needed to decide champions, teams for relegation or teams for UEFA competitions).

=== Results ===
Home \ Away	BKR	FRN	ĦMR	HIB	MXK	MQB	MSD	PTA	SLM	VLT
Birkirkara	—	3–2	5–0	0–2	2–0	1–0	1–1	2–0	1–1	0–1
Floriana	0–0	—	1–1	1–0	1–4	4–1	2–3	4–0	2–2	0–4
Ħamrun Spartans	2–2	2–1	—	2–2	7–3	3–0	1–2	2–3	0–3	0–0
Hibernians	1–1	1–1	1–1	—	1–1	2–0	4–0	2–0	1–2	0–0
Marsaxlokk	3–1	3–2	0–1	5–0	—	1–0	5–0	3–1	0–0	1–1
Mqabba	1–4	1–3	1–2	0–1	0–2	—	2–1	1–6	3–2	1–2
Msida Saint-Joseph	0–0	0–2	0–1	2–0	1–3	4–3	—	7–0	1–4	1–1
Pietà Hotspurs	2–1	1–3	0–3	0–2	0–1	5–0	0–1	—	1–0	1–3
Sliema Wanderers	0–2	0–1	1–1	2–1	1–0	4–0	3–0	2–1	—	2–2
Valletta	2–1	2–3	4–1	1–1	7–0	3–1	3–1	3–0	1–2	—

Source: RSSSF
Legend: Blue = home team win; Yellow = draw; Red = away team win.

== Second phase ==
=== Top Six ===
The teams placed in the first six positions in the league table qualified for the Top Six, and the points obtained during the first phase were halved (and rounded up) before the start of second phase. As a result, the teams started with the following points before the second phase: Valletta 18 points, Marsaxlokk 16, Sliema Wanderers 16, Floriana 14, Birkirkara 13 and Ħamrun Spartans 13.

Pos	Team	Pld	W	D	L	GF	GA	GD	Pts	Qualification	VLT	MXK	BKR	SLM	FRN	ĦMR
1	Valletta (C)	10	7	1	2	18	11	+7	40	Qualification for the 2008–09 UEFA Champions League	—	0–1	2–1	2–1	1–0	4–1
2	Marsaxlokk	10	6	0	4	21	14	+7	34	Qualification for the 2008–09 UEFA Cup	4–0	—	0–2	4–2	2–0	3–1
3	Birkirkara	10	6	0	4	16	15	+1	31	Qualification for the 2008–09 UEFA Cup	1–1	2–1	—	1–2	1–1	4–0
4	Sliema Wanderers	10	6	2	2	19	8	+11	36		0–2	1–0	1–3	—	0–2	5–3
5	Floriana	10	2	2	6	7	14	−7	22		0–2	1–2	0–2	0–2	—	1–1
6	Ħamrun Spartans	10	0	1	9	12	31	−19	14		2–4	3–4	0–2	0–2	1–2	—

Source: RSSSF
(C) Champions

=== Play-out ===
The teams which finished in the last four league positions were placed in the play-out and at the end of the phase the two lowest-placed teams were relegated to the First Division. The points obtained during the first phase were halved (and rounded up) before the start of second phase. As a result, the teams started with the following points before the second phase: Hibernians 12 points, Msida Saint-Joseph 10, Pietà Hotspurs 7, Mqabba 3.

Pos	Team	Pld	W	D	L	GF	GA	GD	Pts	Qualification or relegation	HIB	MSD	PTA	MQB
7	Hibernians	6	4	1	1	13	8	+5	25	Qualification for the 2008 UEFA Intertoto Cup	—	3–0	4–2	2–1
8	Msida Saint-Joseph	6	4	1	1	16	11	+5	23		3–1	—	3–1	4–2
9	Pietà Hotspurs (R)	6	1	0	5	6	13	−7	10	Relegation to the 2008–09 Maltese First Division	1–2	2–4	—	1–0
10	Mqabba (R)	6	1	2	3	9	12	−3	8	Relegation to the 2008–09 Maltese First Division	1–1	2–2	2–0	—

Source: RSSSF
(R) Relegated

== Season statistics ==
=== Top scorers ===
Rank	Player	Club	Goals
1	(Argentina) Omar Sebastian Monesterolo	Valletta	19
2	(Brazil) Marcelo Pereira	Mqabba	14
3	(Argentina) Julio Alcorsé	Marsaxlokk	12
4	(Malta) Terence Scerri	Hibernians	11
4	(Malta) Jean Pierre Mifsud Triganza	Birkirkara	11
4	(Cameroon) Njongo Priso	Msida Saint-Joseph	11
7	(Montenegro) Aleksandar Madžar	Marsaxlokk	10
7	(Nigeria) Frank Temile	Valletta	10
7	(Malta) Ryan Darmanin	Floriana	10
7	(Nigeria) Alfred Effiong	Ħamrun Spartans	10
7	(Malta) Ivan Woods	Sliema Wanderers	10

=== Hat-tricks ===
Player	For	Against	Result	Date
(Brazil) Marcelo Pereira	Mqabba	Sliema Wanderers	3–2	20 September 2007
(Bulgaria) Martin Deanov	Pietà Hotspurs	Mqabba	6–1	20 October 2007
(Argentina) Omar Sebastian Monesterolo^{4}	Valletta	Marsaxlokk	7–0	1 December 2007
(Cameroon) Njongo Priso^{4}	Msida Saint-Joseph	Pietà Hotspurs	7–0	27 December 2007
(Argentina) Omar Sebastian Monesterolo	Valletta	Ħamrun Spartans	4–1	19 January 2008
(Malta) Jean Pierre Mifsud Triganza	Birkirkara	Ħamrun Spartans	4–0	5 April 2008

== Awards ==
=== Monthly awards ===
Month	Player of the Month	
Month	Player	Club
August	(North Macedonia) Darko Krsteski	Floriana
September	(Malta) Gilbert Agius	Valletta
October	(Malta) Andrew Cohen	Hibernians
November/December	(Malta) Shaun Bajada	Birkirkara
January	(Malta) Cleavon Frendo	Marsaxlokk
February	(Malta) Kevin Sammut	Marsaxlokk
March	(Nigeria) Frank Temile	Valletta
April	(Malta) Kevin Sammut	Marsaxlokk
May	(Malta) Kevin Sammut	Marsaxlokk

=== Annual awards ===
Winners are listed first and highlighted in boldface.

Best Maltese Player of the Year	Best Foreign Player of the Year
**Gilbert Agius (Valletta)**; Andrew Hogg (Valletta); Kevin Sammut (Marsaxlokk)	**Frank Temile (Valletta)**; Marcelo Pereira (Mqabba); Njongo Priso (Msida Saint-Joseph)
Best Goalkeeper of the Year	Best Defender of the Year
**Andrew Hogg (Valletta)**; Omar Borg (Birkirkara); Reuben Debono (Marsaxlokk)	**Ronni Hartvig (Birkirkara)**; Brian Said (Sliema Wanderers); Josef Mifsud (Valletta)
Best Midfielder of the Year	Best Attacker of the Year
**Kevin Sammut (Marsaxlokk)**; Gilbert Agius (Valletta); David Camilleri (Valletta)	**Frank Temile (Valletta)**; Omar Sebastián Monesterolo (Valletta); Marcelo Pereira (Mqabba)
Coach of the Year	Most Prominent Youngster
**Paul Zammit (Valletta)**; Brian Talbot (Marsaxlokk); John Buttigieg (Birkirkara)	**Frank Temile (Valletta)**; Ryan Fenech (Ħamrun Spartans); Steve Bezzina (Valletta)
