= Mark Scerri =

Maltese footballer

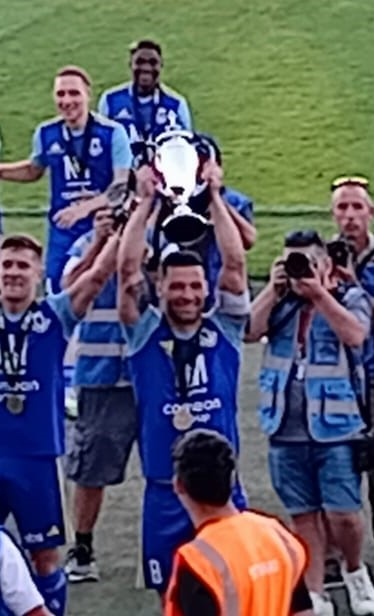
- Scerri lifting the Maltese FA Trophy in 2024.

Personal information
- Date of birth: 16 January 1990 (age 36)
- Place of birth: Malta
- Position: Midfielder

Team information
- Current team: Sliema Wanderers

Senior career*
Years	Team	Apps	(Gls)
2005–	Sliema Wanderers	315	(24)

International career
2013–2015	Malta	3	(0)
- * Club domestic league appearances and goals as of 08:06, 26 May 2024 (UTC)

Mark Scerri (born 16 January 1990) is a Maltese international footballer who plays for Sliema Wanderers, as a midfielder.

== Career ==
Scerri has played club football for Sliema Wanderers.

He made his international debut for Malta in 2013.
