= 1996–97 Maltese Premier League =

Maltese Premier League
- Season: 1996–97
- Champions: Valletta (15th title)
- Relegated: Rabat Ajax; Lija Athletic
- UEFA Champions League: Valletta
- UEFA Cup Winners' Cup: Hibernians
- UEFA Cup: Birkirkara
- UEFA Intertoto Cup: Floriana
- Matches played: 135
- Goals scored: 432 (3.2 per match)
- Top goalscorer: Danilo Dončić (32)

The 1996–97 Maltese Premier League was the 17th season of the Maltese Premier League, and the 82nd season of top-tier football in Malta. It was contested by 10 teams, and Valletta F.C. won the championship.

== Teams ==
Locations of the 1996–97 Maltese Premier League teams

== League standings ==
Pos	Team	Pld	W	D	L	GF	GA	GD	Pts	Qualification
1	Valletta (C)	27	21	4	2	80	22	+58	67	Qualification for the UEFA Champions League
2	Birkirkara	27	18	6	3	46	21	+25	60	Qualification for the UEFA Cup
3	Floriana	27	16	5	6	56	28	+28	53	Qualification for the UEFA Intertoto Cup
4	Sliema Wanderers	27	14	4	9	58	30	+28	46	
5	Ħamrun Spartans	27	12	3	12	46	40	+6	39	
6	Hibernians	27	10	7	10	39	38	+1	37	Qualification for the UEFA Cup Winners' Cup (Note: Hibernians qualified for the Cup Winners' Cup as Maltese FA Trophy Runners-up, as winners Valletta already qualified for the UEFA Champions League.)
7	Pietà Hotspurs	27	11	3	13	35	41	−6	36	
8	Naxxar Lions	27	5	7	15	18	45	−27	22	
9	Rabat Ajax (R)	27	5	3	19	32	73	−41	18	Relegation
10	Lija Athletic (R)	27	2	0	25	22	94	−72	6	Relegation

Source: rsssf.com
(C) Champions; (R) Relegated

== Results ==
=== Matches 1–18 ===
Home \ Away	BKR	FRN	HIB	ĦMR	LJA	NXR	PTA	RBT	SLM	VLT
Birkirkara	—	3–1	1–1	0–0	3–0	3–1	1–0	0–0	3–2	1–0
Floriana	1–2	—	1–0	2–2	2–0	4–1	1–0	3–0	0–3	0–0
Hibernians	1–1	0–1	—	3–1	4–0	0–0	2–0	3–2	1–0	1–4
Ħamrun Spartans	1–2	1–3	1–1	—	6–1	4–0	2–1	3–1	2–1	2–4
Lija Athletic	1–2	0–7	0–3	0–3	—	0–2	1–2	1–5	2–4	1–8
Naxxar Lions	0–1	0–4	0–0	0–1	2–2	—	0–0	2–2	1–1	1–1
Pietà Hotspurs	0–1	0–5	2–0	3–0	1–2	1–0	—	3–1	1–2	0–3
Rabat Ajax	1–4	1–1	0–6	1–2	1–4	2–0	1–2	—	2–0	0–2
Sliema Wanderers	0–2	3–1	3–0	3–0	4–2	3–0	1–3	7–0	—	2–3
Valletta	2–0	1–2	3–0	3–0	5–2	5–1	6–2	4–1	1–1	—

Legend: Blue = home team win; Yellow = draw; Red = away team win.

=== Matches 19–27 ===
Home \ Away	BKR	FRN	HIB	ĦMR	LJA	NXR	PTA	RBT	SLM	VLT
Birkirkara	—	—	—	—	—	4–2	—	4–1	1–0	1–3
Floriana	2–0	—	0–0	1–4	—	—	3–1	—	1–3	—
Hibernians	1–1	—	—	—	—	2–1	—	6–3	0–2	—
Ħamrun Spartans	0–3	—	3–0	—	4–0	0–1	—	—	—	1–2
Lija Athletic	0–2	1–5	2–3	—	—	—	2–5	—	—	—
Naxxar Lions	—	0–1	—	—	1–0	—	1–3	—	—	0–3
Pietà Hotspurs	0–0	—	2–1	1–0	—	—	—	0–1	1–1	—
Rabat Ajax	—	2–4	—	0–2	2–1	0–1	—	—	—	2–5
Sliema Wanderers	—	—	—	3–1	5–0	0–0	—	3–0	—	1–2
Valletta	—	0–0	4–0	—	3–0	—	3–1	—	—	—

Legend: Blue = home team win; Yellow = draw; Red = away team win.

== Top goalscorers ==
Rank	Player	Club	Goals
1	(Federal Republic of Yugoslavia) Danilo Dončić	Valletta	32
2	(Malta) Stefan Sultana	Ħamrun Spartans	23
3	(Malta) Gilbert Agius	Valletta	17
4	(Malta) Hubert Suda	Sliema Wanderers	15
5	(Tunisia) Ridha Dardouri	Lija Athletic	13
6	(Republic of Ireland) Brian Crawley	Hibernians	12
7	(Malta) Carmel Busuttil	Sliema Wanderers	11
8	(Malta) Jonathan Magri Overend	Birkirkara	10
9	(Nigeria) Victor Egere	Floriana	9
9	(Malta) Kevin Mamo	Pietà Hotspurs	9
