= Ronni Hartvig =

Danish footballer (born 1978)

Personal information
- Date of birth: 26 May 1978 (age 48)
- Place of birth: Denmark
- Height: 1.84 m (6 ft 0 in)
- Position: Defender

Senior career*
Years	Team	Apps	(Gls)
1996–1999	Helsingør		
2000–2002	HIK		
2003–2004	KA	29	(0)
2005	HIK		
2007–2010	Birkirkara	30	(7)
2011	St. Andrews		
2012	Ħamrun Spartans	14	(1)
- * Club domestic league appearances and goals

Ronni Hartvig (born 26 May 1978) is a Danish former footballer who played as a defender.

== Career ==
In 2007, Hartvig signed for Maltese side Birkirkara. He was regarded as one of the club's most important players. He helped the club win the 2008 Maltese FA Trophy and played in the UEFA Cup. He almost retired from professional football in 2009.

== Style of play ==
Hartvig mainly operated as a defender. He was known for his goalscoring ability while playing for Maltese side Birkirkara.

== Personal life ==
Hartvig was born in 1978 in Denmark. He has worked as a project manager.
