= Chucks Nwoko =

Maltese football player and manager (born 1978)

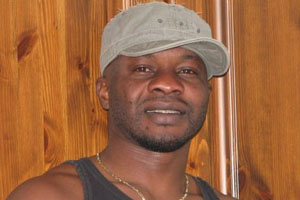

Personal information
- Full name: Afraik Kaejtan Nwoko
- Date of birth: 21 November 1978 (age 47)
- Place of birth: Lagos, Nigeria
- Position: Midfielder

Team information
- Current team: Balzan Youths (under-19 coach)

Senior career*
Years	Team	Apps	(Gls)
1995	Julius Berger		
1995–2006	Birkirkara	229	(59)
2001	→ CSKA Sofia (loan)	4	(0)
2006	Marsaxlokk	13	(0)
2006–2008	Sliema Wanderers	23	(5)
2008–2009	Qormi	12	(0)

International career
1998–2003	Malta	46	(1)

Managerial career
- 2010–: Balzan Youths (under-19 coach)
- * Club domestic league appearances and goals

Afraik Kaejtan "Chucks" Nwoko (born 21 November 1978) is a former professional footballer who played at both professional and international levels as a midfielder. Born in Nigeria, he represented the Malta national team. He is the under-19 coach for Maltese First Division side Balzan Youths.

== Playing career ==
Born in Lagos, Nigeria, Nwoko began his senior career in 1995 with Julius Berger. He joined Maltese team Birkirkara later that year, and after a loan spell in Bulgaria with CSKA Sofia in 2001, also played for Marsaxlokk, Sliema Wanderers and Qormi, retiring in 2009.

== International career ==
After marrying a Maltese national – therefore becoming eligible to play for the Malta national football team, Nwoko made his international debut in 1998. He made a total of 46 international appearances, scoring one goal, until 2003.

== Personal life ==
His son Kyrian is also a professional footballer, and plays as a winger and forward for the Malta national team.
