= Branko Nišević =

Serbian football manager (born 1971)

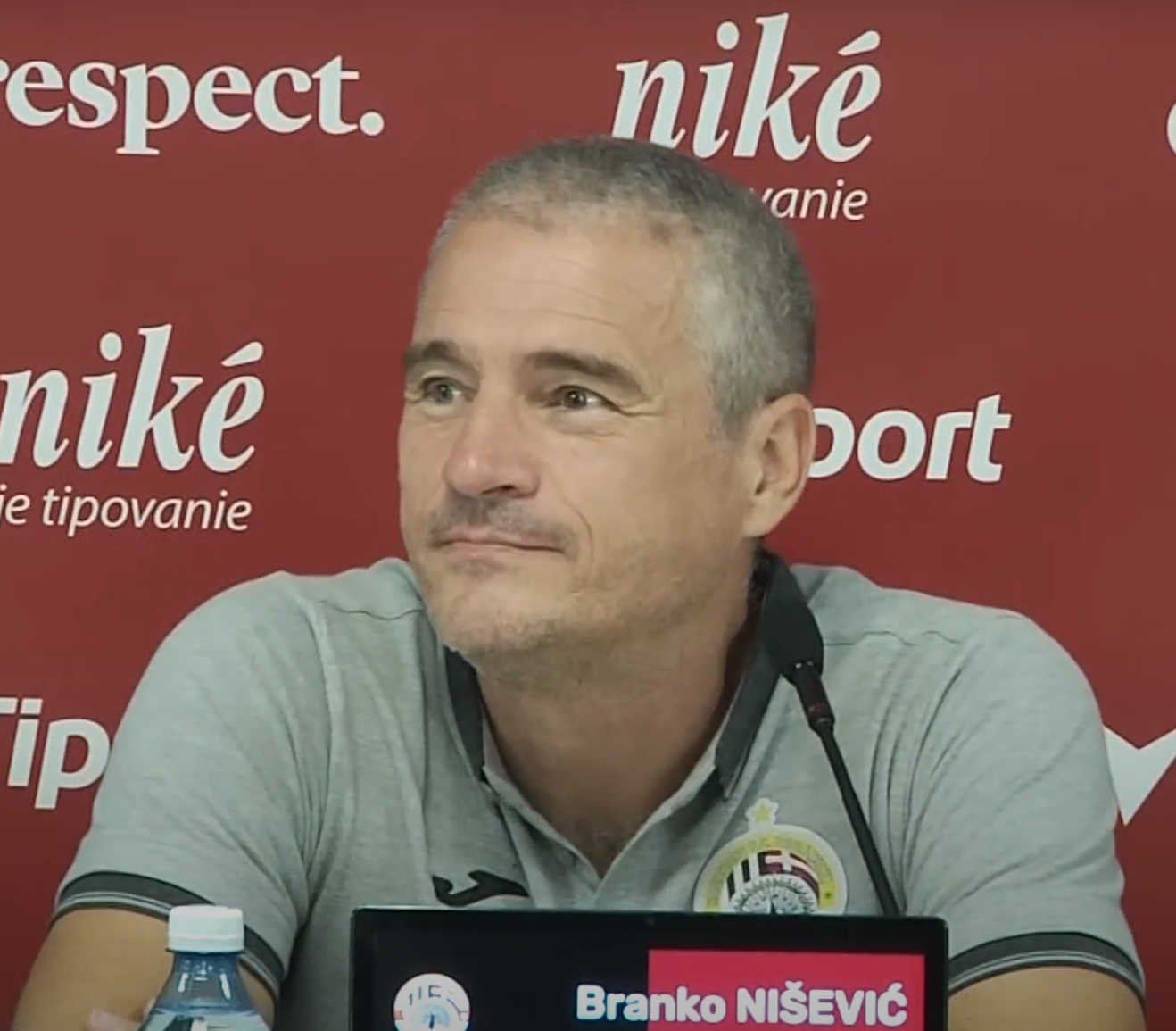
- Nišević in a post-match interview against Spartak Trnava

Personal information
- Date of birth: August 31, 1971 (age 55)
- Place of birth: Zemun, Serbia

Senior career*
| Years | Team | Apps | (Gls) |
| –2011 | Birkirkara F.C. | | |

Managerial career
- 2011–2013: Malta U19
- 2013–2016: Hibernians
- 2016: Gżira United
- 2018–2019: Malta (assistant)
- 2020–2021: Sliema Wanderers
- 2021–2022: Nadur Youngsters
- 2022–2023: Hamrun Spartans
- 2023–2026: Hibernians
- 2026–Current: Sliema Wanderers
- * Club domestic league appearances and goals

Branko Nišević (born 31 August 1971) is a Serbian football manager and former player who was last the head coach of Maltese Premier League side, Hibernians FC.

== Playing career ==
While playing with Valletta FC, Nišević scored the winning goal in the 89th minute of a 1–0 win against San Ġwann, helping his team advance to the second round of the Malta FA Trophy.

== Managerial career ==
=== Early career ===
In the summer of 2016, Nišević became the new head coach of Gżira United FC. He resigned from his position in November of the same year. In 2018, he became the assistant coach to Ray Farrugia in the Malta national football team.

=== Ħamrun Spartans ===
On 15 February 2022, Nišević was appointed as the new head coach of Hamrun Spartans FC. He won the “Coach of the Month” award in October 2022. He would win Spartans their ninth Premier League title in his first season, finishing with a 19-point gap over Birkirkara. He also led the team to a historic result in the UEFA Conference League, achieving qualification to the play-off round. It would be the best result ever recorded by a Maltese club in a European competition. At the end of the final match of the season, Nišević announced during an interview with the national broadcaster that he would not be continuing with the club in the following season.

=== Return to Hibernians ===
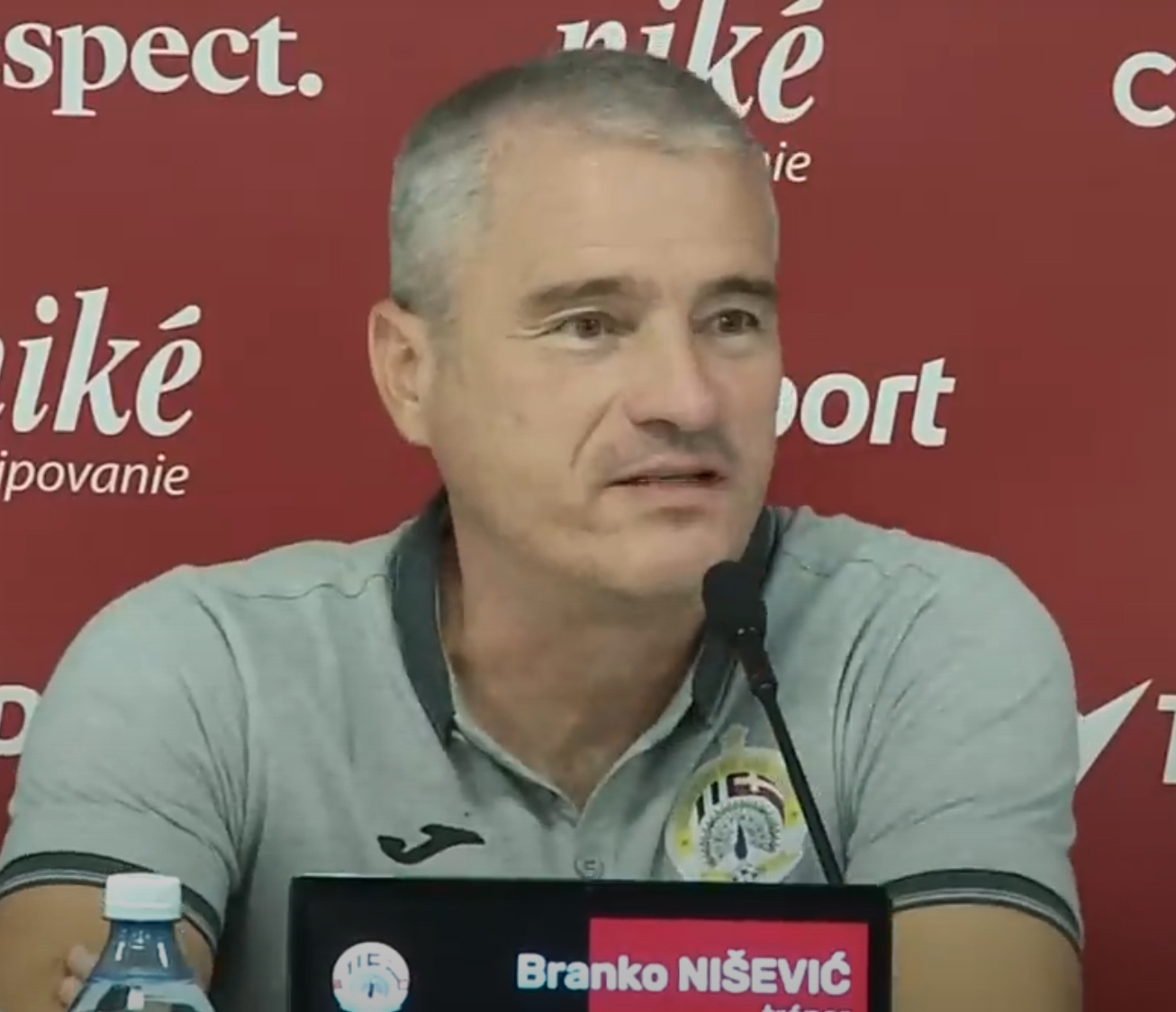
Nišević in 2025

On 17 July 2023, it was announced by Hibernians FC that the club had appointed Nišević as their new manager, replacing Silvio Vella. Despite finishing in the bottom-six in the league table, he would win the Maltese Super Cup with the club, achieving a spot in the Conference League qualifiers. Hibernians would be drawn with Slovak club FC Spartak Trnava, where they were knocked out 7–2 on aggregate. On 26 February 2026, it was announced that Nišević would no longer be the manager of Hibernians. The decision to sack him came a day after a 3–2 loss against Gżira United, knocking the club out of the cup.
