= Danilo Dončić =

Serbian footballer (1969–2024)

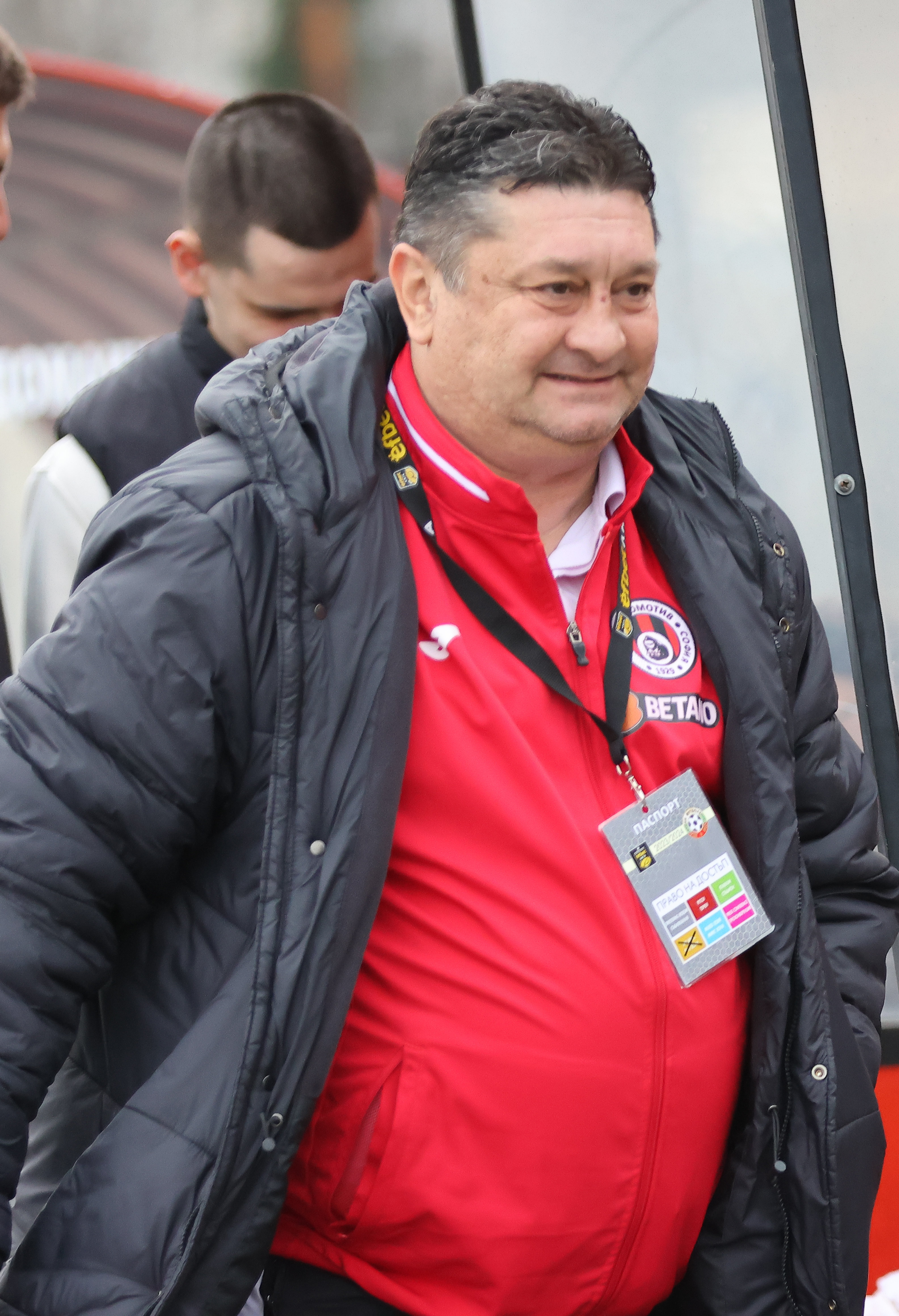
- Dončić in Lokomotiv Sofia, 2024

Personal information
- Date of birth: 20 August 1969
- Place of birth: Vranje, SR Serbia, SFR Yugoslavia
- Date of death: 1 May 2024 (aged 54)
- Place of death: Sofia, Bulgaria
- Position: Forward

Youth career
- 1981–1989: Beograd

Senior career*
Years	Team	Apps	(Gls)
1989–1990	Rudar Ljubija	23	(1)
1990–1992	Napredak Kruševac		
1992–1993	Čukarički		
1993–1994	Beograd		
1994–1997	Valletta	63	(58)
1997–1999	Lokomotiv Sofia	49	(17)
1999–2001	Imortal DC	43	(6)
2001–2006	Sliema Wanderers	133	(93)
2006–2007	San Ġwann	6	(2)

Managerial career
- 2006–2007: San Ġwann
- 2007–2008: Floriana
- 2008–2010: Lokomotiv Sofia (assistant)
- 2010–2011: Kavala (assistant)
- 2011–2012: Sliema Wanderers
- 2012–2013: Tarxien Rainbows
- 2013–2014: Mosta
- 2014: St. Andrews
- 2014–2015: Al-Najma
- 2015–2016: Ethnikos Achnas
- 2016–2017: St. Andrews
- 2017–2019: Valletta
- 2022: Valletta
- 2023–2024: Lokomotiv Sofia
- * Club domestic league appearances and goals

Danilo Dončić (Serbian Cyrillic: Данило Дончић; 20 August 1969 – 1 May 2024) was a Serbian football player and manager.

== Early life ==
Dončić was born in Vranje but spent most of his early life in Belgrade. He started his youth football career with FK Beograd before joining his first professional football team, FK Rudar Ljubija playing back then in the Yugoslav Second League.

== Playing career ==
Dončić continued his professional career with famous Serbian football clubs FK Napredak Kruševac, FK Čukarički before returning to FK Beograd. Having spent the majority of his early football career in Serbia, Dončić decided to try the international waters by joining Valletta where he won all possible Maltese Cups in one season 2006–07 and was the top scorer in Malta by breaking the record of scoring 32 league goals in one season. He left Malta for one of the top Bulgarian clubs Lokomotiv Sofia and continued his career by moving to Portugal playing for Imortal DC. After that he spent five years playing for Sliema Wanderers where he won three league campaigns in a row and one trophy. In those years of his most success Dončić was three times top scorer of the Maltese Premier League. In total, he played eight years in Malta with a record of 196 games played and 151 goals scored. In May 2006 at the age of 37, Dončić retired from playing football.

== Coaching career ==
Dončić decided to concentrate on coaching and soon after he finished his career as a player, he started coaching the First Division Maltese team San Ġwann in 2006. In the consecutive season, he signed with Floriana as a head coach of this premier Maltese team. Floriana, a team with a successful football history placed fifth in the Premier league and was a semi-finalist in the Trophy for the same year.

Following this achievement, Dončić was invited by one of the best Serbian coaches, Dragan Okuka, where he accepted to become his first assistant coach in Dončić's ex-club Lokomotiv Sofia. Subsequently, Dončić moved on to a top Greek league team Kavala together with Dragan Okuka. After some time, Okuka resigned and Dončić continued working with Henryk Kasperczak till the year 2011. At the same time, Dončić was contacted by Sliema Wanderers for the post of a head coach and he returned to Malta to take over his ex-team Sliema Wanderers from February 2011 till May 2012. For the remainder of 2012, Dončić coached Premier League team Tarxien Rainbows. His career continued with Mosta (2013–2014) and St. Andrews (2014 – autumn 2014) as a club manager. With the start of the new football season Dončić decided to accept the offer of Al-Najma (2014–2015) on position of club manager. Following a successful year at Al-Najma Dončić took the contract with Ethnikos Achnas (2015–2016). He was back to the Maltese Premier League after reaching an agreement with St. Andrews.

In February 2022 Dončić came back to Valletta for a second spell as a manager, signing a contract until the end of the season.

== Death ==
Dončić died of a heart attack in Sofia, on 1 May 2024, at the age of 54.

== Honours ==
Valletta

- Maltese Premier League: 1997
- FA Trophy: 1995, 1996, 1997

Sliema Wanderers

- Maltese Premier League: 2003, 2004, 2005
- FA Trophy: 2004
