= Marcelin Tamboulas =

Central African Republic footballer

Marcelin Tamboulas (born 24 April 1980 in Bangui) is a Central African Republic striker, who plays for Congo Premier League side AC Léopards.

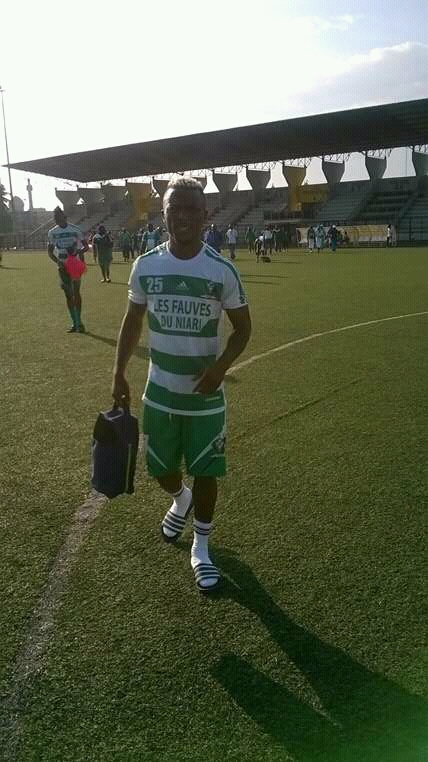
Marcelin Tamboulas is a Central African Republic striker.

== Career ==
He signed a contract in August 2007 with Maltese club Birkirkara FC. After five games with the team he travelled home for personal reasons and failed to return, resulting in a release from his contract at the end of December 2007.

== International career ==
Tamboulas is a first option as a striker with the national team, however he can also adapt to play as a right wing midfielder.

He played for the Central African Republic national football team at the 2005 CEMAC Cup.

Season	Team	Matches	Goals
2002-2003	(Central African Republic) Olympic Real de Bangui	--	--
2003-2004	(Gabon) CS Stade d'Akebe Libreville	--	--
2004-2005	(Gabon) CS Stade d'Akebe Libreville	--	--
2005-2006	(Gabon) FC 105 Libreville	--	--
2006-2007	(Gabon) FC 105 Libreville	--	--
2007-2008	(Malta) Birkirkara FC	5	1
2009	(Democratic Republic of the Congo) TP Mazembe	30	6
2010	(Democratic Republic of the Congo) TP Mazembe	--	--
2011	(Republic of the Congo) Diables Noirs	--	--
2012	(Republic of the Congo) Diables Noirs	--	--
2013	(Republic of the Congo) Diables Noirs	--	--
