= Rodrigo Cariaga =

Argentine footballer

Personal information
- Full name: Rodrigo Martin Cariaga
- Date of birth: 15 December 1981 (age 44)
- Place of birth: Santa Fe, Argentina
- Height: 1.72 m (5 ft 8 in)
- Position: Midfielder

Senior career*
| Years | Team | Apps | (Gls) |
| -2003 | Juventud Antoniana | 2 | (0) |
| 2003 | Atlético Veragüense | | |
| 2004-2005 | General Paz Juniors | 24 | (0) |
| 2005-2006 | Sportivo Belgrano | 17 | (0) |
| 2006 | Patronato | 7 | (0) |
| 2007 | Alianza de Cutral Có | 15 | (0) |
| 2007-2008 | Atlético Policial | 17 | (0) |
| 2008-2009 | Tarxien Rainbows | | |
- * Club domestic league appearances and goals

Rodrigo Martin Cariaga (born 15 December 1981) is an Argentine former footballer who is last known to have played as a midfielder for Tarxien Rainbows.

== Career ==
Cariaga started his career with Argentine second division side Juventud Antoniana, where he made 2 league appearances and scored 0 goals.

In 2003, he signed for Atlético Veragüense in Panama.

In 2004, Cariaga signed for Argentine third division club General Paz Juniors, where he made 24 league appearances and scored 0 goals.

In 2005, he signed for Sportivo Belgrano in the Argentine fourth division.

In 2008, Cariaga signed for Maltese team Tarxien Rainbows.

== Personal life ==
He is the son of former footballer Mario Cariaga.
