= Daniel Nwoke =

Nigerian footballer

Personal information
- Full name: Daniel Chimezie Nwoke
- Date of birth: 16 June 1983 (age 43)
- Place of birth: Lagos, Nigeria
- Height: 1.89 m (6 ft 2 in)
- Position: Striker

Youth career
- Nitel FC

Senior career*
Years	Team	Apps	(Gls)
2001–2002	Naxxar Lions	17	(9)
2002–2007	Msida Saint-Joseph	112	(76)
2007–2008	Tampere United	26	(6)
2008–2009	TPV Tampere		
2010	PK-35 Vantaa	17	(7)
2011	Floriana	12	(13)
2011–2012	Qormi	9	(4)
- * Club domestic league appearances and goals

Daniel Nwoke (born 16 June 1983 in Nigeria) is a Nigerian retired professional footballer who is last known to have played for Qormi of the Maltese Premier League from 2011 to 2012.

== Career ==
=== Malta ===
Journeying to Malta for the prevalence of football opportunities there in 2001, Nwoke trialed for Birkirkara that year, which proved unsuccessful.

Nwoke was on the verge of taking up a contract with Pieta Hotspurs in 2005, but the deal fell through.

Attracting foreign interest through his time with Msida, the Nigerian concluded a move to Qormi in 2011, bagging four goals in his first 2 outings and earning the Player of the Month award for January before parting ways with the club in early 2012.

=== Finland ===
On trial with Tampere United, then of the Finnish Veikkausliiga in 2006, Nwoke extended his contract in 2008, parting ways with the club in 2009 and trialling with Hämeenlinna in 2012.
