= Steve Bezzina =

Maltese footballer

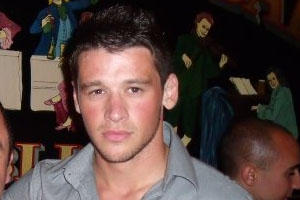

Personal information
- Full name: Steven Bezzina
- Date of birth: 5 January 1987 (age 39)
- Place of birth: Pietà, Malta
- Height: 5 ft 10 in (1.78 m)
- Positions: Left back; central defender

Team information
- Current team: Balzan
- Number: 11

Youth career
- 1992–1997: Sirens
- 1998–2005: Valletta

Senior career*
Years	Team	Apps	(Gls)
2005–2012	Valletta	112	(1)
2010–2012	→ Sliema Wanderers (loan)	45	(1)
2012	Msida Saint-Joseph	0	(0)
2012–2013	Mosta	17	(1)
2013–	Balzan	141	(3)

International career^{‡}
- Malta U17
- Malta U19
	Malta U21	10	(1)
2009–	Malta	9	(0)
- * Club domestic league appearances and goals as of 23 November 2018 ‡ National team caps and goals as of 28 March 2015

Steven Bezzina (born 5 January 1987 in Pietà, Malta) is a footballer who plays for Maltese Premier League side Balzan, where he plays as a defender.

== Playing career ==
=== Valletta ===
Bezzina joined the Valletta youth set up in 1998. He had been spotted playing for local side Sirens, whom he had joined as a five-year-old in 1992.

He made his debut for Valletta during the 2005–06 season, and quickly established himself as a regular first team player in the squad, he made 16 appearances, but failed to score as Valletta finished in fifth position in the Maltese Premier League.

For the 2006–07 season, Bezzina looked to help Valletta improve on their previous league position, as he made 23 appearances, but again failed to score, Valletta did however manage to improve their league finish, as they recorded a fourth-place finish.

The 2007–08 season proved to be Steve's most successful at Valletta, as the club won the Maltese Premier League title, with Bezzina again making 23 appearances, but failing to score.

Bezzina went into the 2008–09 season, hoping to help the improving Valletta retain the Maltese Premier League title, however the club could only manage a second-place finish, as Hibernians beat them to the title by two points. Bezzina made 23 appearances and scored no goals during the season.

Valletta again finished in second place in the 2009–10 season, Bezzina remained a regular in the first team. He played 27 games and scored his first Maltese Premier League goal in April 2010 against Qormi.

== International career ==
=== Malta ===
Bezzina made his international debut for the Maltese national team, and gained his first cap in a friendly on 18 November 2009, in the 4–1 home defeat to Bulgaria.

== Honours ==
=== Valletta ===
Winner

- 2007–08 Maltese Premier League

=== Balzan ===
Winner

- 2018-19 Maltese FA Cup

== Career statistics ==
Statistics accurate as of match played 9 August 2009.

Club performance			League		Cup		League Cup		Continental		Total	
Season	Club	League	Apps	Goals	Apps	Goals	Apps	Goals	Apps	Goals	Apps	Goals
Malta			League		Maltese Cup		League Cup		Europe		Total	
2005–06	Valletta	Maltese Premier League	16	0	0	0	0	0	0	0	16	0
2006–07	Valletta	Maltese Premier League	23	0	0	0	0	0	0	0	23	0
2007–08	Valletta	Maltese Premier League	23	0	0	0	0	0	0	0	23	0
2008–09	Valletta	Maltese Premier League	23	0	0	0	0	0	0	0	23	0
2009–10	Valletta	Maltese Premier League	27	1	0	0	0	0	0	0	27	1
Total	Malta		112	1	0	0	0	0	0	0	112	1
Career total			112	1	0	0	0	0	0	0	112	1
