= Gilbert Agius =

Maltese football manager

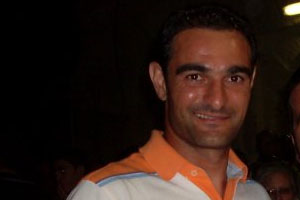

Personal information
- Full name: Gilbert Agius
- Date of birth: 21 February 1974 (age 52)
- Place of birth: Valletta, Malta
- Height: 1.76 m (5 ft 9 in)
- Position: Forward

Senior career*
Years	Team	Apps	(Gls)
1990–2014	Valletta	453	(182)
2001	→ Pisa (loan)	4	(0)
2013–2014	→ Xewkija Tigers (loan)	0	(0)
Total		457	(182)

International career
1989–1990	Malta U16	5	(0)
1990–1992	Malta U18	5	(0)
1990–1995	Malta U21	16	(3)
1993–2009	Malta	120	(8)

Managerial career
- 2014: Valletta
- 2019: Valletta
- 2020: Valletta (caretaker)
- 2021–2022: Malta U21
- 2022: Malta (caretaker)
- 2023–2025: PSIS Semarang
- 2026: Żabbar St. Patrick
- * Club domestic league appearances and goals

Gilbert Agius (born 21 February 1974) is a Maltese professional football manager and former footballer who played as a forward. He has a UEFA Pro coaching license.

== Playing career ==
Agius was the captain of his hometown club side Valletta and is a well known figure in Maltese football history. He is hailed as a hero by Valletta fans, due to his loyalty to his hometown club. He left for a short time during the first half of the 2001–02 season which he spent on loan to the Lega Pro Prima Divisione club Pisa. His number 7 shirt is retired in respect of his loyalty and great service to the club. He is the most capped player and the all time goal scorer at Valletta

Gilbert Agius has received three Malta Football Association Player of the Year awards. The first was won in 1996–97, the second in Valletta's successful 2000–01 season, the third in 2006–07.

At the start of the 2007–08 season Agius was on trial with Enköpings SK FK, but later he opted to stay with Valletta. At the end of 2007 Agius was out with a thigh injury for several months. He returned just as the team started fulfilling its potential, and led Valletta to the first title since 2000–01. He won a single Player of the Month award during the season (September 2007) and was chosen as Best Local Player in the Maltese Football Awards at the end of the 2007–08 season.

At the beginning of the 2012–13 season Agius was named to be Assistant Manager of Valletta, with new Manager Mark Miller. He later left this role and came out of retirement to play for Gozo side Xewkija Tigers helping them to win the Gozo Football League.

== Coaching career ==
After his short spell with Xewkija Tigers, Agius came back to Valletta, where he took again the place of assistant manager. In such role he had the chance to replace the head coach several times. In 2019 he replaced Danilo Doncic as a caretaker manager of the citizens, and led the club to win the title after beating Hibernians in the decider match. In December 2020 Agius came back in help of his club, taking the role of caretaker coach again after the resignation of Jesmond Zerafa. At the end of the year he was replaced by Tozé Mendes, coming back to his role as assistant manager.

In January 2021 Agius was appointed as new head coach of the Malta national under-21 football team.

For the first time ever in his career, Aguis coached outside Europe. On 15 February 2023 Agius was appointed as new head coach of the Indonesian club PSIS Semarang.

== Achievements ==
=== Player ===
- Maltese Premier League: 8

1991–92, 1996–97, 1997–98, 1998–99, 2000–01, 2007–08, 2010–11, 2011–12

- Maltese FA Trophy: 7

1994–95, 1995–96, 1996–97, 1998–99, 2000–01, 2009–10

- Maltese Super Cup: 9

1989–90, 1994–95, 1996–97, 1997–98, 1998–99, 2000–01, 2008–09, 2010–11, 2011–12

- Centenary Cup: 1

2000

- National League 100 Anniversary Cup: 1

2009–10

- BetFair Cup: 1

2008

- Löwenbräu Cup: 6

1993–94, 1994–95, 1995–96, 1996–97, 1997–98, 2000–01

- Super Five Cup: 4

1992–93, 1996–97, 1999–00, 2000–01, 2007–08

- Mare Blu Cup: 2

2010, 2011

- Euro Cup: 1

2011–12

- Maltese Player of the Year: 3

1996–97, 2000–01, 2006–07

=== Manager ===
- Maltese Premier League: 1

2018–19

=== Assistant Manager ===
- Maltese Premier League: 3

2013–14, 2015–16, 2017–18

- Maltese FA Trophy: 2

2013–14, 2017–18

- Maltese Super Cup: 3

2015–16, 2017–18, 2018–19

- Euro Challenge Cup: 2

2013–14, 2014–15

== International career ==
=== Malta ===
Gilbert made 120 appearances for the Malta national team, making him the third most capped player in the country’s history. He played as a defensive midfielder for the national team and scored eight international goals. At club level, he played primarily as a supporting forward. Gilbert also served as captain of the Malta national team.

Agius' goal in a 1–1 friendly game against Austria was voted Goal of the Season in the 2006–07 Malta Football Awards.

=== International goals ===
Malta Goals

#	Date	Venue	Opponent	Score	Result	Competition
1.	14 August 1996	Laugardalsvöllur, Reykjavík, Iceland	Iceland	1–0	1–2	Friendly
2.	8 June 1997	Tórsvøllur, Tórshavn, Faroe Islands	Faroe Islands	1–0	1–2	1998 FIFA World Cup qualifying
3.	6 February 2000	National Stadium, Ta' Qali, Malta	Azerbaijan	2–0	3–0	Rothmans Cup
4.	6 February 2000	National Stadium, Ta' Qali, Malta	Azerbaijan	3–0	3–0	Rothmans Cup
5.	5 September 2001	Na Stínadlech, Teplice, Czech Republic	Czech Republic	2–2	2–3	2002 FIFA World Cup qualifying
6.	11 February 2002	National Stadium, Ta' Qali, Malta	Lithuania	1–1	1–1	Rothmans Cup
7.	15 November 2006	Tony Bezzina Stadium, Paola, Malta	Lithuania	1–3	1–4	Friendly
8.	7 February 2007	National Stadium, Ta' Qali, Malta	Austria	1–0	1–1	Friendly

== Managerial statistics ==
As of 25 April 2025

Managerial record by team and tenure
Team	Nat	From	To	Record					Ref.
Team	Nat	From	To	G	W	D	L	Win %	Ref.
Valletta	(Malta)	1 July 2014	10 October 2014	9	2	1	6	22.22	
Valletta	(Malta)	13 April 2019	30 June 2019	7	5	1	1	71.43	
Valletta (caretaker)	(Malta)	1 December 2020	27 December 2020	2	1	1	0	50.00	
Malta U21	(Malta)	26 January 2021	7 November 2022	13	2	1	10	15.38	
Malta (caretaker)	(Malta)	8 November 2022	14 December 2022	2	0	1	1	0.00	
PSIS Semarang	(Indonesia)	15 February 2023	29 April 2025	73	23	15	35	31.51	
Career Total				106	33	20	53	31.13	

== See also ==
- List of men's footballers with 100 or more international caps
