= Amed Davy Sylla =

French, Ivorian and Russian footballer (born 1982)

Personal information
- Date of birth: 4 October 1982 (age 44)
- Place of birth: Lille, France
- Height: 1.85 m (6 ft 1 in)
- Position: Forward

Senior career*
Years	Team	Apps	(Gls)
2003–2004	FC Nordjylland		
2005	Ítróttarfelag Fuglafjarðar		
2006–2007	B36 Tórshavn		
2007–2008	Birkirkara		
2008	FC Amager		
2008–2009	Hvidovre IF		
2009–2010	Istres	4	(0)
2010	Alfortville		
- * Club domestic league appearances and goals

Amed Davy Sylla (born 4 October 1982) is a former professional footballer who played as a forward for FC Nordjylland, ÍF Fuglafjørður, B36 Tórshavn, Birkirkara, FC Amager, Hvidovre IF, Istres and Alfortville. Sylla holds French, Ivorian and Russian citizenship.
