= Sebastián Monesterolo =

Argentine footballer

Sebastian Monesterolo
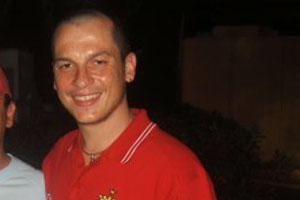

Personal information
- Full name: Omar Sebastián Monesterolo
- Date of birth: 30 March 1983 (age 43)
- Place of birth: San Francisco, Argentina
- Height: 1.81 m (5 ft 11 1/2 in)
- Position: Striker

Youth career
- Boca Juniors
- Banfield

Senior career*
Years	Team	Apps	(Gls)
2004	Sportivo Belgrano		
2005	Juventud Unida		
2005	MPPJ Selangor		
2006	Valletta	12	(11)
2006	Kuwait SC		
2006–2008	Valletta	40	(35)
2008	Hapoel Bnei Lod	7	(0)
2009	Valletta	14	(1)
2009	East Bengal		
2009–2010	Atenas		
2010	Crucero		
2010–2011	Desamparados		
2011–2015	Club Atlético San Jorge		
2015	Sarmiento Leones		
2015–2016	Central Norte		
2016	9 de Julio de Rafaela		
- * Club domestic league appearances and goals

Omar Sebastián Monesterolo (born 30 March 1983 in San Francisco, Argentina) is an Argentine football striker.

== Career ==
Born in San Francisco, Córdoba, Monesterolo began playing football in the youth systems of Boca Juniors and Banfield before debuting in the Torneo Argentino A with his home town's Sportivo Belgrano during 2004. He also played in Torneo Argentino A with Juventud Unida de Gualeguaychú before moving abroad to play in India, Israel, Kuwait, Malaysia and Malta. After returning to Argentina he joined several lower-league sides, including Alem de Río Cuarto, Crucero del Norte, Sarmiento de Leones, Central Norte and 9 de Julio de Rafaela.

In 2005, he was playing for the Malaysian side MPPJ Selangor FC, in the Malaysia Super League.

In 2007/08 he was playing for Valletta FC in the Maltese Premier League.

Montesterolo appeared in seven league matches and two cup matches while playing for Liga Leumit side Hapoel Bnei Lod F.C. during 2008.

In 2009, he moved to India and signed with East Bengal, that competes in I-League.

Monesterolo last played for 9 de Julio de Rafaela in Torneo Federal B (the regionalized fourth level of Argentine football) during 2016.
