= Frank Temile =

Nigerian footballer

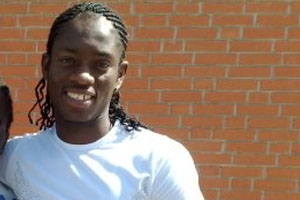

Personal information
- Full name: Frank Temile
- Date of birth: 15 July 1990 (age 36)
- Place of birth: Lagos, Nigeria
- Height: 5 ft 8 in (1.73 m)
- Position: Forward

Youth career
- Covenant Lagos

Senior career*
Years	Team	Apps	(Gls)
2006–2007	Shooting Stars		
2007–2008	Valletta	20	(10)
2008–2013	Dynamo Kyiv	1	(0)
2010	→ Dynamo-2 Kyiv	10	(1)
2011	→ Oleksandriya (loan)	1	(0)
2012–2013	→ Dynamo-2 Kyiv	25	(3)
2013–2014	Birkirkara	25	(6)
2014–2015	Qormi	21	(6)
2015	Naxxar Lions	9	(0)
2015–2017	Birkirkara	15	(7)
2017–2020	Sliema Wanderers	55	(6)
2020	→ Lija Athletic (loan)	8	(4)
2020–	Swieqi United	55	(6)
Total		246	(49)

International career
2010	Nigeria U20	3	(0)
- * Club domestic league appearances and goals as of 19:43, 18 August 2020 (UTC)

Frank Temile (born 15 July 1990) is a Nigerian footballer who plays as a striker.

== Playing career ==
=== Covenant Lagos ===
Born in Lagos, Nigeria, Frank Temile began his football career in his native country Nigeria where he began with Covenant Lagos.

=== Shooting Stars ===
Temile joined leading Nigerian Premier League side Shooting Stars where he played the 2006–07 season with the club.

=== Valletta ===
Following some impressive displays for Shooting Stars, Frank gained a move to Valletta, where he was allocated the number 14 shirt. He was chosen as the third foreigner to play for Valletta. On 4 October 2007, he made his debut in the 2–1 defeat against Sliema Wanderers.

In his first season (2007–08) he scored 10 goals, and helped the club win the Maltese Premier League for the first time in seven years. His impact during the first season was so great that he was nominated for three prestigious awards in the Malta Football Awards. These are Best Forward, Most Promising Player and Best Foreign Player. Morevover he managed to win all the three awards he was nominated in. He also won Replay Gala Night Player of the Year, where the local players voted for him.

On 26 May 2008, it was reported that Temile, together with his agent Henry Ekezie, had travelled to Munich for a trial with a leading German club.

=== Dynamo Kyiv ===
Temile joined FC Dynamo Kyiv in the summer of 2008. In his five-years with the club he only made one league cap and three caps in the Ukrainian Cup. In his tenure with Dynamo, Temile was mostly used in the reserve team FC Dynamo-2 Kyiv that played in the Ukrainian First League.

=== Back to Malta ===
Temile joined Birkirkara in the 2013 summer transfer market. The next season Temile joined Qormi. On 2 February 2015 he moved to Naxxar Lions.

== Personal life ==
Temile was an orphan. Unfortunately he lost his mother when he was three and his father when he was 11. He moved to Malta when he was 16 years old where he was adopted by the family Gauci.

Temile comes from a football family. His uncle, Clement Temile, who is the father of Israeli international Toto Tamuz, was capped by Nigeria several times and his brother, Omonigho Temile, played for Botev Plovdiv.

== Honours ==
=== Club ===
- Maltese Premier League
  - Winner : 2007–08 with Valletta
- Maltese Super Cup
  - Winner : 2013–14 with Birkirkara

=== Individual ===
- Malta Football Awards
  - Best Forward
    - Winner : 2007–08
  - Most Promising Player
    - Winner : 2007–08
  - Best Foreign Player
    - Winner : 2007–08
