= List of Maltese football transfers summer 2009 =

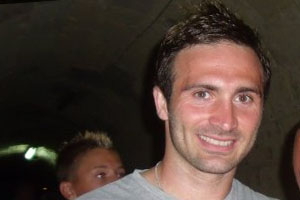
Kevin Sammut joined Valletta from Marsaxlokk.

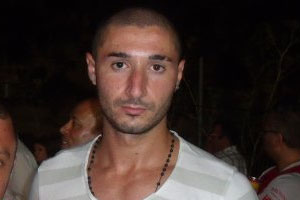
Terence Scerri joined Valletta from Hibernians.

This is a list of Maltese football transfers for the 2009-10 summer transfer window by club. Only transfers of clubs in the Maltese Premier League are included. However, this includes clubs that may be moved to a different division during the season.

The summer transfer window opened on 1 July 2009, although a few transfers may take place prior to that date. The window closed at midnight on 31 August 2009. Players without a club may join one at any time, either during or in between transfer windows.

== Player transfers ==
=== Birkirkara ===
In: Note: Flags indicate national team as defined under FIFA eligibility rules; some limited exceptions apply. Players may hold more than one non-FIFA nationality.

No.	Pos.	Nation	Player
1	GK	(Spain) ESP	Jorge Mora (from (Spain) Barcelona B)
5	DF	(Malta) MLT	Sean Ellul (loan return from Msida Saint-Joseph)
5	DF	(Malta) MLT	Branko Nisevic (from Sliema Wanderers)
15	DF	(Serbia) SRB	Nikola Vukanac (from Vittoriosa Stars)
—	MF	(Malta) MLT	Adrian Ciantar (loan return from Qormi)
16	MF	(Malta) MLT	Carl Pulo (from Pietà Hotspurs)
17	FW	(Netherlands) NED	Sylvano Comvalius (from Ħamrun Spartans)
—	FW	(Malta) MLT	Iro Curmi (loan return from St. George's)

Out: Note: Flags indicate national team as defined under FIFA eligibility rules; some limited exceptions apply. Players may hold more than one non-FIFA nationality.

No.	Pos.	Nation	Player
1	GK	(Malta) MLT	Bernard Paris (on loan to Floriana)
5	DF	(Malta) MLT	Patrick Borg (on loan to Mqabba)
3	DF	(Italy) ITA	Mauro Di Lello (released)
14	DF	(Denmark) DEN	Ronni Hartvig (retired)
3	DF	(Malta) MLT	Clint Zammit (on loan to Għargħur)
13	MF	(Malta) MLT	Martin Anastasi (on loan to Mqabba)
23	MF	(Malta) MLT	Luke Sciberras (to St. Patrick)
—	FW	(Malta) MLT	Iro Curmi (on loan to Msida Saint-Joseph)
16	FW	(Bulgaria) BUL	Kiril Mihaylov (to (Bulgaria) PFC Minyor Pernik)
8	FW	(Malta) MLT	Jean Pierre Mifsud Triganza (to Sliema Wanderers)
24	FW	(Bulgaria) BUL	Ivaylo Sokolov (loan return to (Bulgaria) FC Vihren)
11	FW	(Bulgaria) BUL	Krasen Vulkov (released)

=== Dingli Swallows ===
In: Note: Flags indicate national team as defined under FIFA eligibility rules; some limited exceptions apply. Players may hold more than one non-FIFA nationality.

No.	Pos.	Nation	Player
12	GK	(Malta) MLT	Ivan Cassar (from Hibernians)
18	DF	(Malta) MLT	Matthew Borg (from Qormi)
5	DF	(Brazil) BRA	Renato Conceição (from Marsaxlokk)
8	DF	(Malta) MLT	Justin Muscat (on loan from Valletta)
6	DF	(Malta) MLT	Shawn Tellus (on loan from Marsaxlokk)
17	MF	(Malta) MLT	Kevin Borg (on loan from Ħamrun Spartans)
3	MF	(Malta) MLT	Clint Caruana (on loan from Sliema Wanderers)
9	MF	(Nigeria) NGA	Haruna Doda (from St. Patrick)
13	MF	(Malta) MLT	Christian Muscat (on loan from Rabat Ajax)
19	MF	(Brazil) BRA	André Rocha da Silva (from Msida Saint-Joseph)
20	FW	(Nigeria) NGA	Josef Okonkwo (from Unknown)
23	FW	(Malta) MLT	Dylan Zarb (on loan from Valletta)

Out: Note: Flags indicate national team as defined under FIFA eligibility rules; some limited exceptions apply. Players may hold more than one non-FIFA nationality.

No.	Pos.	Nation	Player
—	DF	(Malta) MLT	Ryan Mintoff (loan return to Hibernians)
—	FW	(Malta) MLT	Chris Ciappara (loan return to Attard)
—	FW	(Malta) MLT	Mark Galea (loan return to Zejtun Corinthians)

=== Floriana ===
In: Note: Flags indicate national team as defined under FIFA eligibility rules; some limited exceptions apply. Players may hold more than one non-FIFA nationality.

No.	Pos.	Nation	Player
12	GK	(Malta) MLT	Jurgen Micallef (loan return from Vittoriosa Stars)
1	GK	(Malta) MLT	Bernard Paris (on loan from Birkirkara)
3	DF	(Malta) MLT	Clifton Ciantar (from Sliema Wanderers)
8	MF	(Malta) MLT	Christian Cassar (on loan from Marsaxlokk)
20	FW	(Malta) MLT	Roberto Brincat (loan return from San Gwann)
9	FW	(England) ENG	Donovan Simmonds (from (England) Coventry City)
11	FW	(Nigeria) NGA	Akanni-Sunday Wasiu (from (England) Colchester United)

Out: Note: Flags indicate national team as defined under FIFA eligibility rules; some limited exceptions apply. Players may hold more than one non-FIFA nationality.

No.	Pos.	Nation	Player
1	GK	(Germany) GER	Steffen Sussner (released)
12	GK	(Malta) MLT	Glen Zammit (loan return to Gudja United)
15	DF	(Malta) MLT	Steve Bonnici (loan return to Melita)
—	DF	(Malta) MLT	Clyde Camoin (to Hamrun Spartans)
22	MF	(Malta) MLT	Mauro Brincat (on loan to Vittoriosa Stars)
—	MF	(Malta) MLT	Mark Gauci (on loan to Mqabba)
9	FW	(Brazil) BRA	Paulo Rodrigo Da Silva (released)
8	FW	(Malta) MLT	Dylan Zarb (loan return to Valletta)

=== Hibernians ===
In: Note: Flags indicate national team as defined under FIFA eligibility rules; some limited exceptions apply. Players may hold more than one non-FIFA nationality.

No.	Pos.	Nation	Player
—	GK	(Malta) MLT	David Cassar (loan return from St. Patrick)
20	DF	(Malta) MLT	Ryan Camilleri (from Pietà Hotspurs)
3	DF	(Malta) MLT	Edward Herrera (from Melita)
14	DF	(Malta) MLT	Ryan Mintoff (loan return from Dingli Swallows)
13	MF	(Malta) MLT	Gary Inguanez (loan return from St. Patrick)
—	MF	(Nigeria) NGA	Charles Obi Ikechukwu (from Unknown)
—	FW	(Argentina) ARG	Julio Alcorsé (loan return from Marsaxlokk)
9	FW	(Malta) MLT	Etienne Barbara (from (Germany) SC Verl)
11	FW	(Serbia) SRB	Milan Cvetić (from (Gozo) Kerċem Ajax)
—	FW	(Cameroon) CMR	Edouard Ndjodo (from (Hungary) Budapest Honvéd)

Out: Note: Flags indicate national team as defined under FIFA eligibility rules; some limited exceptions apply. Players may hold more than one non-FIFA nationality.

No.	Pos.	Nation	Player
—	GK	(Malta) MLT	David Cassar (on loan to Tarxien Rainbows)
—	GK	(Malta) MLT	Ivan Cassar (to Dingli Swallows)
7	DF	(Malta) MLT	Clayton Failla (to Sliema Wanderers)
—	DF	(Malta) MLT	Kurt Formosa (to Vittoriosa Stars)
14	DF	(Malta) MLT	Ryan Mintoff (to Tarxien Rainbows)
13	DF	(Malta) MLT	Jonathan Xerri (on loan to Vittoriosa Stars)
14	MF	(Guinea-Bissau) GNB	Zeferino Paulo Borges (released)
13	MF	(Malta) MLT	Gary Inguanez (on loan to Vittoriosa Stars)
—	MF	(Nigeria) NGA	Charles Obi Ikechukwu (released)
—	MF	(Malta) MLT	Clayton Micallef (on loan to Vittoriosa Stars)
—	FW	(Argentina) ARG	Julio Alcorsé (to (Paraguay) Club Guaraní)
—	FW	(Cameroon) CMR	Edouard Ndjodo (released)
9	FW	(Malta) MLT	Terence Scerri (to Valletta)

=== Marsaxlokk ===
In: Note: Flags indicate national team as defined under FIFA eligibility rules; some limited exceptions apply. Players may hold more than one non-FIFA nationality.

No.	Pos.	Nation	Player
1	GK	(Malta) MLT	Reuben Gauci (loan return from Qormi)
21	GK	(Malta) MLT	Glen Zammit (from Gudja United)
35	DF	(Benin) BEN	Florent Raimy (from (Romania) FCM Bacău)
27	DF	(Malta) MLT	Shawn Tellus (loan return from Qormi)
24	DF	(Bulgaria) BUL	Emil Yanchev (from (Cyprus) Unknown)
19	MF	(Malta) MLT	Roderick Bajada (on loan from Sliema Wanderers)
—	MF	(Malta) MLT	André Schembri (loan return from (Germany) Carl Zeiss Jena)
7	FW	(Bulgaria) BUL	Martin Deanov (from Pietà Hotspurs)

Out: Note: Flags indicate national team as defined under FIFA eligibility rules; some limited exceptions apply. Players may hold more than one non-FIFA nationality.

No.	Pos.	Nation	Player
—	GK	(Malta) MLT	Luca Bugeja (on loan to Senglea Athletic)
1	GK	(Malta) MLT	Reuben Gauci (on loan to St. Andrews)
22	GK	(Malta) MLT	Saviour Darmanin (retired)
24	DF	(Malta) MLT	Arnold Buttigieg (to St. Patrick)
5	DF	(Brazil) BRA	Renato Conceição (to Dingli Swallows)
27	DF	(Malta) MLT	Shawn Tellus (on loan to Dingli Swallows)
15	MF	(Malta) MLT	Mark Barbara (loan return to Valletta)
25	MF	(Malta) MLT	Christian Cassar (on loan to Floriana)
21	MF	(Malta) MLT	Claude Mattocks (released)
7	MF	(Malta) MLT	Kevin Sammut (to Valletta)
—	MF	(Malta) MLT	André Schembri (to SK Austria Kärnten)
9	FW	(Argentina) ARG	Julio Alcorsé (loan return to Hibernians)
19	FW	(Brazil) BRA	Marcelo Pereira (to Ħamrun Spartans)

=== Qormi ===
In: Note: Flags indicate national team as defined under FIFA eligibility rules; some limited exceptions apply. Players may hold more than one non-FIFA nationality.

No.	Pos.	Nation	Player
1	GK	(Malta) MLT	Matthew Camilleri (from Msida Saint-Joseph)
22	DF	(Malta) MLT	Jonathan Bondin (on loan from Valletta)
5	DF	(Malta) MLT	Malcolm Buttigieg (from Tarxien Rainbows)
29	DF	(Malta) MLT	Sharlon Pace (from Pietà Hotspurs)
23	DF	(Malta) MLT	Kenneth Spiteri (from Msida Saint-Joseph)
19	MF	(Malta) MLT	Ryan Deguara (on loan from Mosta)
11	MF	(Malta) MLT	Joseph Farrugia (from Sliema Wanderers)
8	MF	(Malta) MLT	Keith Fenech (on loan from Valletta)
6	MF	(Malta) MLT	Massimo Grima (on loan from Valletta)
17	FW	(Brazil) BRA	Camilo Da Silva (from (Brazil) Corinthians Alagoano)
18	FW	(Malta) MLT	Steven Meilak (on loan from Ħamrun Spartans)

Out: Note: Flags indicate national team as defined under FIFA eligibility rules; some limited exceptions apply. Players may hold more than one non-FIFA nationality.

No.	Pos.	Nation	Player
28	GK	(Malta) MLT	Reuben Gauci (loan return to Marsaxlokk)
18	DF	(Malta) MLT	Matthew Borg (to Dingli Swallows)
3	DF	(Malta) MLT	Clifton Ciantar (loan return to Sliema Wanderers)
13	DF	(Malta) MLT	Shawn Tellus (loan return to Marsaxlokk)
7	MF	(Malta) MLT	Anatole Debono (to St. Andrews)
11	MF	(Malta) MLT	Joseph Farrugia (loan return to Sliema Wanderers)
8	MF	(Malta) MLT	Keith Fenech (loan return to Valletta)
6	MF	(Malta) MLT	Massimo Grima (loan return to Valletta)
19	MF	(Brazil) BRA	Ivan (released)
21	MF	(Malta) MLT	Chucks Nwoko (retired)
22	FW	(Malta) MLT	Paul Camilleri (loan return to Birzebbuga St. Peters)
14	FW	(Malta) MLT	Carmel Formosa (to Zejtun Corinthians)

=== Sliema Wanderers ===
In: Note: Flags indicate national team as defined under FIFA eligibility rules; some limited exceptions apply. Players may hold more than one non-FIFA nationality.

No.	Pos.	Nation	Player
25	GK	(Brazil) BRA	Michael Lima (from Unknown)
—	DF	(Malta) MLT	Clifton Ciantar (loan return from Qormi)
77	DF	(Malta) MLT	Clayton Failla (from Hibernians)
13	DF	(Malta) MLT	Clifford Gatt Baldacchino (loan return from Tarxien Rainbows)
5	DF	(Malta) MLT	Josef Mifsud (from Valletta)
—	MF	(Malta) MLT	Joseph Farrugia (loan return from Qormi)
6	MF	(Malta) MLT	Ryan Fenech (on loan from Ħamrun Spartans)
9	FW	(Malta) MLT	Jean Pierre Mifsud Triganza (from Birkirkara)
20	FW	(Germany) GER	Henry Isaac (from Vittoriosa Stars)

Out: Note: Flags indicate national team as defined under FIFA eligibility rules; some limited exceptions apply. Players may hold more than one non-FIFA nationality.

No.	Pos.	Nation	Player
1	GK	(Malta) MLT	Henry Bonello (on loan to Vittoriosa Stars)
13	DF	(Malta) MLT	Jeffrey Chetcuti (to Vittoriosa Stars)
—	DF	(Malta) MLT	Clifton Ciantar (to Floriana)
—	DF	(Malta) MLT	Kane Paul Farrugia (to Mosta)
20	DF	(Malta) MLT	Beppe Muscat (on loan to Vittoriosa Stars)
5	DF	(Malta) MLT	Branko Nisevic (to Birkirkara)
22	MF	(Malta) MLT	Roderick Bajada (on loan to Marsaxlokk)
—	MF	(Malta) MLT	Clint Caruana (on loan to Dingli Swallows)
21	MF	(Costa Rica) CRC	Victor Coto Ortega (released)
—	MF	(Malta) MLT	Joseph Farrugia (to Qormi)
18	MF	(Australia) AUS	Daniel Severino (released)

=== Tarxien Rainbows ===
In: Note: Flags indicate national team as defined under FIFA eligibility rules; some limited exceptions apply. Players may hold more than one non-FIFA nationality.

No.	Pos.	Nation	Player
12	GK	(Malta) MLT	David Cassar (on loan from Hibernians)
20	DF	(Malta) MLT	Ryan Mintoff (from Hibernians)
—	DF	(Malta) MLT	Stacey Vella (on loan from Msida Saint-Joseph)
8	MF	(Brazil) BRA	Everton Antonio Pereira (from (Poland) Jagiellonia Białystok)
11	MF	(Malta) MLT	David Camilleri (from Valletta)
77	MF	(Malta) MLT	Kurt Magro (on loan from Valletta)
7	FW	(Malta) MLT	Gianluca Calabretta (from Mosta)
9	FW	(Brazil) BRA	Anderson Ribeiro (from (Ukraine) FC Kharkiv)
18	FW	(Malta) MLT	Simon Shead (loan return from Pietà Hotspurs)

Out: Note: Flags indicate national team as defined under FIFA eligibility rules; some limited exceptions apply. Players may hold more than one non-FIFA nationality.

No.	Pos.	Nation	Player
12	GK	(Malta) MLT	Michael Falzon (loan return to Ħamrun Spartans)
5	DF	(Malta) MLT	Malcolm Buttigieg (to Qormi)
—	DF	(Brazil) BRA	Éverson Alan da Lima (to (Romania) CS Pandurii Târgu Jiu)
6	DF	(Malta) MLT	Clifford Gatt Baldacchino (loan return to Sliema Wanderers)
17	MF	(Malta) MLT	Kevin Borg (loan return to Ħamrun Spartans)
34	MF	(Malta) MLT	David Camilleri (loan return to Valletta)
15	FW	(Brazil) BRA	Daniel Mariano Bueno (to (Poland) Odra Wodzisław)

=== Valletta ===
In: Note: Flags indicate national team as defined under FIFA eligibility rules; some limited exceptions apply. Players may hold more than one non-FIFA nationality.

No.	Pos.	Nation	Player
4	DF	(Malta) MLT	Steve Borg (from Mosta)
—	MF	(Malta) MLT	Mark Barbara (loan return from Marsaxlokk)
10	MF	(Malta) MLT	David Camilleri (loan return from Tarxien Rainbows)
77	MF	(Netherlands) NED	Jordi Cruyff (from free agent)
—	MF	(Malta) MLT	Keith Fenech (loan return from Qormi)
—	MF	(Malta) MLT	Massimo Grima (loan return from Qormi)
—	MF	(Malta) MLT	Kurt Magro (loan return from Msida Saint-Joseph)
23	MF	(Malta) MLT	Kevin Sammut (from Marsaxlokk)
16	FW	(Netherlands) NED	Geert den Ouden (from (Netherlands) De Graafschap)
21	FW	(Malta) MLT	Terence Scerri (from Hibernians)
—	FW	(Malta) MLT	Dylan Zarb (loan return from Floriana)

Out: Note: Flags indicate national team as defined under FIFA eligibility rules; some limited exceptions apply. Players may hold more than one non-FIFA nationality.

No.	Pos.	Nation	Player
4	DF	(Malta) MLT	Jonathan Bondin (on loan to Qormi)
23	DF	(Malta) MLT	Josef Mifsud (to Sliema Wanderers)
—	DF	(Malta) MLT	Justin Muscat (on loan to Dingli Swallows)
—	MF	(Malta) MLT	Mark Barbara (on loan to Ħamrun Spartans)
10	MF	(Malta) MLT	David Camilleri (to Tarxien Rainbows)
—	MF	(Malta) MLT	Keith Fenech (on loan to Qormi)
—	MF	(Malta) MLT	Massimo Grima (on loan to Qormi)
—	MF	(Malta) MLT	Kurt Magro (on loan to Tarxien Rainbows)
11	FW	(Brazil) BRA	Paulo Massaro (released)
21	FW	(Argentina) ARG	Omar Sebastián Monesterolo (to (India) East Bengal Club)
—	FW	(Malta) MLT	Dylan Zarb (on loan to Dingli Swallows)

=== Vittoriosa Stars ===
In: Note: Flags indicate national team as defined under FIFA eligibility rules; some limited exceptions apply. Players may hold more than one non-FIFA nationality.

No.	Pos.	Nation	Player
1	GK	(Malta) MLT	Henry Bonello (on loan from Sliema Wanderers)
—	DF	(Malta) MLT	Brandon Bonnici (on loan from Ghaxaq)
13	DF	(Malta) MLT	Jeffrey Chetcuti (from Sliema Wanderers)
6	DF	(Malta) MLT	Kurt Formosa (from Hibernians)
18	DF	(Malta) MLT	Beppe Muscat (on loan from Sliema Wanderers)
19	DF	(Czech Republic) CZE	Martin Hrubsa (from (Austria) SV Ziersdorf)
8	DF	(Serbia) SRB	Nikola Vukanac (from (Slovakia) MFK Vranov nad Topľou)
20	DF	(Malta) MLT	Jonathan Xerri (on loan from Hibernians)
10	MF	(Malta) MLT	Mauro Brincat (on loan from Floriana)
—	MF	(Malta) MLT	Gary Inguanez (on loan from Hibernians)
21	MF	(Malta) MLT	Clayton Micallef (on loan from Hibernians)
—	FW	(Malta) MLT	Paul Camilleri (on loan from Birzebbuga St. Peters)
23	FW	(Germany) GER	Henry Isaac (from free agent)
9	FW	Gozo	Elton Vella (on loan from (Gozo) Sannat Lions)

Out: Note: Flags indicate national team as defined under FIFA eligibility rules; some limited exceptions apply. Players may hold more than one non-FIFA nationality.

No.	Pos.	Nation	Player
—	GK	(Malta) MLT	Jurgen Micallef (loan return to Floriana)
—	DF	(Malta) MLT	Robert Adami (released)
—	DF	(Malta) MLT	David Gauci (loan return to St. Patrick)
19	DF	(Czech Republic) CZE	Martin Hrubsa (from Ħamrun Spartans)
8	DF	(Serbia) SRB	Nikola Vukanac (to Birkirkara)
—	MF	(Malta) MLT	Stephen Calleja (released)
—	MF	(Malta) MLT	Howard Hughes (to Senglea Athletic)
—	MF	(Malta) MLT	Larry Lagana (released)
—	MF	(Malta) MLT	Silvan Privitelli (released)
—	FW	(Malta) MLT	Kenneth Abela (to Zejtun Corinthians)
—	FW	(Nigeria) NGA	Anthony Eviparker (released)
23	FW	(Germany) GER	Henry Isaac (to Sliema Wanderers)

== Manager transfers ==
Name	Moving from	Moving to	Source
(Brazil) Antonio Vieira	Floriana	released	
(Malta) Paul Zammit	Valletta	released	
(Netherlands) Ton Caanen	free agent	Valletta	
(Malta) John Buttigieg	Birkirkara	released	
(Malta) Paul Zammit	free agent	Birkirkara	
(Republic of Ireland) Roddy Collins	free agent	Floriana	
(Malta) Gorg Faure	Vittoriosa Stars	released	
(Malta) Winston Muscat	St. Patrick	Vittoriosa Stars	

== See also ==
- (Belgium) List of Belgian football transfers summer 2009
- (Denmark) List of Danish football transfers summer 2009
- (Netherlands) List of Dutch football transfers summer 2009
- (England) List of English football transfers summer 2009
- (France) List of French football transfers summer 2009
- (Germany) List of German football transfers summer 2009
- (Greece) List of Greek football transfers summer 2009
- (Italy) List of Italian football transfers summer 2009
- (Scotland) List of Scottish football transfers 2009–10
- (Spain) List of Spanish football transfers summer 2009
