= List of Maltese football transfers winter 2008–09 =

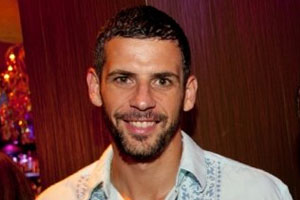
Stephen Wellman moved from Marsaxlokk to Qormi.

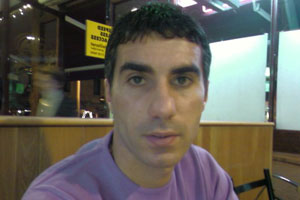
Former Sliema Wanderers and Marsaxlokk striker Aleksandar Madžar was released by Floriana.

This is a list of Maltese football transfers for the 2008-09 winter transfer window by club. Only transfers of the Maltese Premier League are included.

The winter transfer window opened on 1 January 2009, although a few transfers may take place prior to that date. The window closed at midnight on 31 January 2009. Players without a club may join one at any time, either during or in between transfer windows.

The transfer window was concluded on 31 January 2009. The big movers being Roderick Briffa who swapped Sliema Wanderers for current champions Valletta, also joining Valletta were Brazilian striker Paulo Massaro and returning was Argentina striker Omar Sebastián Monesterolo, who had left the club in the summer. Departing the club on a temporary basis were defender Jonathan Bondin who teamed up with Ħamrun Spartans} on loan for the remainder of the season and midfielder David Camilleri who also went on loan for the remainder of the season to Tarxien Rainbows.

Marsaxlokk made an effort to strengthen their team with the signings of Chris Camilleri from Msida Saint-Joseph and Dylan Kokavessis from Ħamrun Spartans. The only outgoing player was Stephen Wellman who joined Qormi.

== Player Transfers ==
=== Birkirkara ===
In: Note: Flags indicate national team as defined under FIFA eligibility rules; some limited exceptions apply. Players may hold more than one non-FIFA nationality.

No.	Pos.	Nation	Player
3	DF	(Italy) ITA	Mauro Di Lello (from Unknown)
24	DF	(Bulgaria) BUL	Ivalio Sokolov (on loan from (Bulgaria) FC Vihren)
16	FW	(Bulgaria) BUL	Kiril Mihaylov (from (Cyprus) Olympiakos Nicosia)
11	FW	(Bulgaria) BUL	Krasen Vulkov (from (Bulgaria) Chavdar Etropole)

Out: Note: Flags indicate national team as defined under FIFA eligibility rules; some limited exceptions apply. Players may hold more than one non-FIFA nationality.

No.	Pos.	Nation	Player
24	DF	(Bulgaria) BUL	Emil Yanchev (to (Cyprus) Unknown)
11	MF	(Brazil) BRA	William Sander Landim (released)

=== Floriana ===
In: Note: Flags indicate national team as defined under FIFA eligibility rules; some limited exceptions apply. Players may hold more than one non-FIFA nationality.

No.	Pos.	Nation	Player
1	GK	(Germany) GER	Steffen Sussner (from (Germany) Sachsen Leipzig)
9	FW	(Brazil) BRA	Paulo Rodrigo Da Silva (from Unknown)

Out: Note: Flags indicate national team as defined under FIFA eligibility rules; some limited exceptions apply. Players may hold more than one non-FIFA nationality.

No.	Pos.	Nation	Player
1	GK	(Serbia) SRB	Dejan Maksić (released)
66	DF	(Malta) MLT	Lee Galea (to Tarxien Rainbows)
99	FW	(Montenegro) MNE	Aleksandar Madžar (released)

=== Ħamrun Spartans ===
In: Note: Flags indicate national team as defined under FIFA eligibility rules; some limited exceptions apply. Players may hold more than one non-FIFA nationality.

No.	Pos.	Nation	Player
1	GK	(Malta) MLT	Ivan Casha (from Marsa)
20	DF	(Romania) ROU	Florin Anton (from (Romania) FC Târgovişte)
22	DF	(Malta) MLT	Jonathan Bondin (on loan from Valletta)
7	FW	(Netherlands) NED	Silvano Comvalius (from Unknown)

Out: Note: Flags indicate national team as defined under FIFA eligibility rules; some limited exceptions apply. Players may hold more than one non-FIFA nationality.

No.	Pos.	Nation	Player
1	GK	(Malta) MLT	Michael Falzon (on loan to Tarxien Rainbows)
13	DF	(Malta) MLT	John Debattista (on loan to Mqabba)
20	DF	(Brazil) BRA	Alex Noronha (released)
16	FW	(Malta) MLT	Dylan Kokavessis (to Marsaxlokk)
7	FW	(Brazil) BRA	Ronaldo Paulista Ortega (released)

=== Hibernians ===
In: Note: Flags indicate national team as defined under FIFA eligibility rules; some limited exceptions apply. Players may hold more than one non-FIFA nationality.

No.	Pos.	Nation	Player

Out: Note: Flags indicate national team as defined under FIFA eligibility rules; some limited exceptions apply. Players may hold more than one non-FIFA nationality.

No.	Pos.	Nation	Player

=== Marsaxlokk ===
In: Note: Flags indicate national team as defined under FIFA eligibility rules; some limited exceptions apply. Players may hold more than one non-FIFA nationality.

No.	Pos.	Nation	Player
10	MF	Gozo	Chris Camilleri (from Msida Saint-Joseph)
14	FW	(Malta) MLT	Dylan Kokavessis (from Ħamrun Spartans)

Out: Note: Flags indicate national team as defined under FIFA eligibility rules; some limited exceptions apply. Players may hold more than one non-FIFA nationality.

No.	Pos.	Nation	Player
10	FW	(Malta) MLT	Stephen Wellman (to Qormi)

=== Msida Saint-Joseph ===
In: Note: Flags indicate national team as defined under FIFA eligibility rules; some limited exceptions apply. Players may hold more than one non-FIFA nationality.

No.	Pos.	Nation	Player

Out: Note: Flags indicate national team as defined under FIFA eligibility rules; some limited exceptions apply. Players may hold more than one non-FIFA nationality.

No.	Pos.	Nation	Player
11	MF	Gozo	Chris Camilleri (to Marsaxlokk)

=== Qormi ===
In: Note: Flags indicate national team as defined under FIFA eligibility rules; some limited exceptions apply. Players may hold more than one non-FIFA nationality.

No.	Pos.	Nation	Player
3	DF	(Malta) MLT	Clifton Ciantar (on loan from Sliema Wanderers)
16	FW	(Malta) MLT	Stephen Wellman (from Marsaxlokk)

Out: Note: Flags indicate national team as defined under FIFA eligibility rules; some limited exceptions apply. Players may hold more than one non-FIFA nationality.

No.	Pos.	Nation	Player

=== Sliema Wanderers ===
In: Note: Flags indicate national team as defined under FIFA eligibility rules; some limited exceptions apply. Players may hold more than one non-FIFA nationality.

No.	Pos.	Nation	Player
15	DF	(Romania) ROU	Lucian Dronca (from (Singapore) Woodlands Wellington)
33	DF	(Italy) ITA	Sam Siro Furfaro (from Unknown)
21	MF	(Costa Rica) CRC	Victor Coto (from Unknown)

Out: Note: Flags indicate national team as defined under FIFA eligibility rules; some limited exceptions apply. Players may hold more than one non-FIFA nationality.

No.	Pos.	Nation	Player
15	DF	(Malta) MLT	Clifford Gatt Baldacchino (on loan to Tarxien Rainbows)
24	DF	(Malta) MLT	Roderick Briffa (to Valletta)
33	DF	(Malta) MLT	Clifton Ciantar (on loan to Qormi)
9	FW	(Serbia) SRB	Kosta Bjedov (released)

=== Tarxien Rainbows ===
In: Note: Flags indicate national team as defined under FIFA eligibility rules; some limited exceptions apply. Players may hold more than one non-FIFA nationality.

No.	Pos.	Nation	Player
—	GK	(Malta) MLT	Michael Falzon (on loan from Ħamrun Spartans)
6	DF	(Malta) MLT	Clifford Gatt Baldacchino (on loan from Sliema Wanderers)
—	DF	(Malta) MLT	Lee Galea (from Floriana)
—	DF	(Brazil) BRA	Éverson (from (Brazil) Clube Atlético Juventus)
—	MF	(Malta) MLT	David Camilleri (on loan from Valletta)
—	MF	(Brazil) BRA	Denni (from (Australia) Newcastle United Jets)

Out: Note: Flags indicate national team as defined under FIFA eligibility rules; some limited exceptions apply. Players may hold more than one non-FIFA nationality.

No.	Pos.	Nation	Player
6	DF	(Montenegro) MNE	Ivan Čarapić (released)
22	MF	(Argentina) ARG	Rodrigo Cariaga (released)

=== Valletta ===
In: Note: Flags indicate national team as defined under FIFA eligibility rules; some limited exceptions apply. Players may hold more than one non-FIFA nationality.

No.	Pos.	Nation	Player
5	DF	(Malta) MLT	Roderick Briffa (from Sliema Wanderers)
11	FW	(Brazil) BRA	Paulo Massaro (from (Brazil) Paraná Clube)
21	FW	(Argentina) ARG	Omar Sebastián Monesterolo (from (Israel) Hapoel Bnei Lod)

Out: Note: Flags indicate national team as defined under FIFA eligibility rules; some limited exceptions apply. Players may hold more than one non-FIFA nationality.

No.	Pos.	Nation	Player
4	DF	(Malta) MLT	Jonathan Bondin (on loan to Ħamrun Spartans)
10	MF	(Malta) MLT	David Camilleri (on loan to Tarxien Rainbows)
15	FW	(Brazil) BRA	Marcelo Peabirú (released)

== Manager Transfers ==
Name	Moving from	Moving to	Source
(Malta) Marco Gerada	Ħamrun Spartans	Resigned	
(Malta) Steve D'Amato	Melita	Ħamrun Spartans	
(England) Brian Talbot	Marsaxlokk	Marsaxlokk (technical director)	
(Malta) Patrick Curmi	Msida Saint-Joseph	Marsaxlokk	
(Malta) Joe Abdilla	Msida Saint-Joseph (assistant)	Msida Saint-Joseph	
(Serbia) Zoran Popovic	Floriana	Resigned	
(Brazil) Antonio Vieira	None	Floriana	

== See also ==
- (Belgium) List of Belgian football transfers winter 2008–09
- (Cyprus) List of Cypriot football transfers winter 2008–09
- (Denmark) List of Danish football transfers winter 2008-09
- (Netherlands) List of Dutch football transfers winter 2008-09
- (England) List of English football transfers winter 2008-09
- (Germany) List of German football transfers winter 2008–09
- (Italy) List of Italian football transfers winter 2008–09
- (Spain) List of Spanish football transfers winter 2008-09
