= List of Malta international footballers =

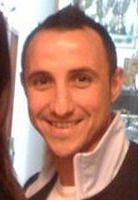
Michael Mifsud is Malta's most-capped player and also the nation's record goalscorer.

The Malta national football team represents the country of Malta in international association football and is controlled by the Malta Football Association (MFA), the local governing body of football which was founded in 1900. The MFA became a member of the Fédération Internationale de Football Association (FIFA) in 1959 and a year later joined the Union of European Football Associations (UEFA). Prior to that, on 24 February 1957, the team played its first official international match at the Empire Stadium against Austria, a 3–2 defeat. The first goal was scored by Tony Cauchi.

As of April 2026, Malta has played 463 international fixtures, winning 66, drawing 77 and losing 320. The team's most frequent opponent has been Iceland, meeting the side 15 times, winning 3, drawing 1 and losing 11. In global and continental competitions, Malta has competed in qualification groups for both the UEFA European Championship, since 1962, and the FIFA World Cup, since 1974, but has failed to qualify for any tournament finals.

Michael Mifsud is Malta's most capped player, accumulating 143 appearances as of November 2020. He made his debut on 10 February 2000 in a 1–0 defeat against Albania. He broke the record previously held by David Carabott of 122 appearances on 15 November 2016 against Iceland. Mifsud is also Malta's leading goalscorer with 42 goals as of November 2020. He surpassed Carmel Busuttil's record of 23 goals on 3 March 2010.

Since 1957, more than 300 players have made at least one international appearance for the team. Of these, seven have achieved more than 100 caps. Carmel Busuttil was the first to reach this milestone on 6 February 2000 against Azerbaijan. The following is a list of all players with at least 25 caps for the national team.

== Key ==
Positions key
GK	Goalkeeper
DF	Defender
MF	Midfielder
FW	Forward

Position
Playing positions are listed according to the player's preferred position, and not based on tactical formations that were employed at the time.
Caps and goals
Caps and goals are composed of FIFA World Cup, UEFA European Championship matches and each competition's required qualification matches, as well as numerous international friendly tournaments and matches.

== Players ==
Player	Position	Caps	Goals	Date of debut	Debut against	Date of last match	Last match against	Ref
Michael Mifsud	FW	143	42	10 February 2000	Albania	11 November 2020	Liechtenstein	
David Carabott	MF	122	11	15 November 1987	Switzerland	9 February 2005	Norway	
Gilbert Agius	MF	120	8	7 November 1993	Gabon	18 November 2009	Bulgaria	
Carmel Busuttil	FW	113	23	5 June 1982	Iceland	25 April 2001	Iceland	
Andrei Agius	DF	103	6	25 February 2006	Moldova	25 March 2022	Azerbaijan	
Joe Brincat	MF	103	6	14 October 1987	England B (Note: The match is recognised as an official International A Match by the Malta Football Association)	14 February 2004	Moldova	
Roderick Briffa	DF	100	1	11 December 2003	Poland	17 November 2018	Kosovo	
John Buttigieg	DF	97	1	23 March 1984	Sweden	3 June 2000	England	
André Schembri	MF	94	3	4 June 2006	Japan	20 November 2018	Faroe Islands	
Brian Said	DF	91	5	14 August 1996	Iceland	18 November 2009	Bulgaria	
Silvio Vella	DF	90	1	18 November 1988	Israel	3 June 2000	England	
Zach Muscat	DF	86	4	4 September 2014	Slovakia	4 October 2026	Andorra	
Steve Borg	DF	82	3	7 October 2011	Latvia	12 October 2025	Bosnia and Herzegovina	
Luke Dimech	DF	78	1	28 April 1989	Iceland	11 November 2003	Czech Republic	
Henry Bonello	GK	78	0	29 February 2012	Liechtenstein	4 October 2026	Andorra	
Joseph Mbong	MF	77	6	29 May 2018	Armenia	4 October 2026	Andorra	
Michael Degiorgio	MF	77	4	7 December 1980	Poland	24 March 1993	Italy	
Hubert Suda	FW	71	8	18 October 1988	Israel	14 November 2001	Canada	
Jeffrey Chetcuti	DF	69	0	30 March 1994	Slovakia	9 February 2005	Norway	
David Cluett	GK	69	0	29 February 1987	Portugal	2 June 1996	FR Yugoslavia	
Nicky Saliba	MF	68	4	23 November 1988	Cyprus	14 November 2011	Canada	
Andrew Cohen	FW	68	1	18 August 2004	Faroe Islands	7 September 2018	Faroe Islands	
Mario Muscat	GK	68	0	15 November 1996	United Arab Emirates	12 August 2009	Georgia	
Raymond Vella	MF	67	1	23 May 1984	Sweden	16 February 1994	Belgium	
Andrew Hogg	GK	67	0	15 November 2006	Lithuania	20 November 2018	Faroe Islands	
Kristian Laferla	MF	65	6	16 November 1986	Sweden	8 February 1998	Latvia	
Charles Scerri	MF	65	3	12 November 1985	Portugal	14 December 1994	Norway	
George Mallia	MF	64	5	6 August 1997	Hungary	18 November 2009	Bulgaria	
Martin Gregory	FW	64	1	12 October 1985	Portugal	6 September 1995	Luxembourg	
Noel Turner	MF	63	2	9 February 1996	Slovenia	27 May 2004	Germany	
Paul Fenech	MF	61	2	18 November 2009	Bulgaria	18 November 2019	Norway	
Jonathan Holland	MF	61	0	24 August 1974	Libya	24 May 1987	Sweden	
Joe Galea	DF	61	0	24 January 1987	Italy	2 September 1998	Germany	
Matthew Guillaumier	MF	58	3	23 March 2019	Faroe Islands	4 October 2026	Andorra	
Clayton Failla	MF	58	2	19 November 2008	Iceland	20 November 2018	Faroe Islands	
Ryan Camenzuli	MF	58	1	25 March 2015	Georgia	4 October 2026	Andorra	
Darren Debono	DF	56	0	7 February 1996	Russia	16 October 2002	France	
Justin Haber	GK	56	0	9 October 2004	Iceland	31 May 2016	Austria	
Richard Buhagiar	DF	55	0	7 June 1991	Indonesia	31 March 2004	Finland	
Teddy Teuma	MF	54	7	3 September 2020	Faroe Islands	4 October 2026	Andorra	
Rowen Muscat	MF	52	1	14 November 2012	Liechtenstein	4 June 2021	Kosovo	
Gareth Sciberras	MF	52	0	11 December 2003	Poland	26 March 2017	Slovakia	
Alexander Satariano	FW	50	5	11 November 2020	Liechtenstein	4 October 2026	Andorra	
Ivan Woods	FW	49	1	11 December 2003	Poland	11 October 2011	Israel	
Edwin Camilleri	DF	49	0	17 November 1985	Sweden	7 June 1995	Norway	
Jamie Pace	MF	48	3	9 February 2005	Norway	7 October 2011	Latvia	
Ryan Fenech	MF	48	1	2 February 2008	Armenia	10 September 2018	Azerbaijan	
Jonathan Caruana	DF	46	2	30 May 2008	Austria	15 November 2019	Spain	
Chucks Nwoko	MF	46	1	6 February 1998	Albania	10 September 2003	Israel	
Antoine Zahra	MF	46	1	11 February 1996	Iceland	12 October 2005	Bulgaria	
Alex Azzopardi	DF	46	0	26 December 1982	Bulgaria	13 March 1991	Netherlands	
Paul Mbong	FW	45	4	3 September 2020	Faroe Islands	4 October 2026	Andorra	
Raymond Xuereb	FW	44	6	18 December 1971	Algeria	21 April 1985	Czechoslovakia	
Stefan Giglio	MF	44	2	1 June 1997	Scotland	4 June 2005	Sweden	
Bjorn Kristensen	MF	43	0	29 February 2012	Liechtenstein	17 November 2023	England	
Enrico Pepe	DF	43	0	6 September 2020	Latvia	4 October 2026	Andorra	
Stephen Pisani	MF	42	1	28 March 2015	Azerbaijan	19 November 2024	Andorra	
Ian Azzopardi	DF	42	1	11 December 2003	Poland	14 October 2009	Portugal	
Ryan Camilleri	DF	42	0	14 August 2012	San Marino	17 November 2018	Kosovo	
Juan Carlos Corbalan	MF	42	1	11 October 2018	Kosovo	4 October 2026	Andorra	
Daniel Bogdanović	FW	41	1	9 February 2002	Jordan	11 September 2012	Italy	
Kurt Shaw	DF	41	0	12 October 2019	Sweden	4 October 2026	Andorra	
Joe Camilleri	DF	39	1	16 November 1986	Sweden	25 March 1998	Finland	
Kyrian Nwoko	FW	38	4	12 November 2017	Estonia	7 June 2025	Lithuania	
Edwin Farrugia	DF	38	0	11 November 1973	Sweden	17 December 1983	Netherlands	
Alfred Effiong	FW	37	4	25 March 2015	Georgia	18 November 2019	Norway	
Kevin Sammut	MF	37	0	9 February 2005	Norway	9 February 2011	Switzerland	
Luke Gambin	MF	36	1	27 May 2016	Czech Republic	20 November 2022	Republic of Ireland	
Alex Muscat	DF	36	0	16 February 2004	Estonia	4 September 2017	Scotland	
Joseph Zerafa	DF	36	0	9 February 2011	Switzerland	18 November 2019	Norway	
David Camilleri	MF	35	0	9 February 1996	Slovenia	15 August 2001	Bosnia and Herzegovina	
Shaun Bajada	MF	35	0	2 February 2008	Armenia	4 June 2014	Gibraltar	
Luke Montebello	FW	35	0	26 March 2017	Slovakia	13 October 2024	Moldova	
Jean Borg	DF	34	0	22 March 2018	Luxembourg	27 September 2026	Liechtenstein	
Stefan Sultana	FW	33	4	7 May 1991	Iceland	21 August 1999	Croatia	
Emanuel Farrugia	DF	32	1	6 September 1977	Tunisia	27 March 1985	West Germany	
Etienne Barbara	FW	31	3	10 September 2003	Israel	14 August 2012	San Marino	
George Xuereb	MF	31	2	31 October 1976	Turkey	17 November 1985	Sweden	
Jake Grech	MF	30	2	29 May 2018	Armenia	27 September 2026	Liechtenstein	
Daniel Theuma	DF	30	1	30 June 1998	Wales	11 December 2003	Poland	
Emanuel Fabri	MF	29	3	28 September 1973	Canada	21 December 1983	Spain	
John Bonello	GK	29	0	28 August 1979	Tunisia	24 January 1987	Italy	
Jurgen Degabriele	FW	28	6	29 May 2018	Armenia	19 November 2024	Andorra	
Willie Vassallo	MF	28	2	4 January 1970	Luxembourg	27 November 1977	Turkey	
Edward Darmanin	DF	28	0	27 April 1969	Austria	27 November 1977	Turkey	
Kenneth Scicluna	DF	27	0	17 August 2005	Northern Ireland	13 May 2010	Germany	
Reginald Cini	GK	26	0	18 October 1988	Israel	14 October 1998	Republic of Ireland	

== References and notes ==
=== Additional references ===
- Strack-Zimmermann, Benjamin. "Malta (2018)". National-Football-Teams.com.
- Mamrud, Roberto. "Malta - Record International Players". Rec.Sport.Soccer Statistics Foundation.
