= Aaron Xuereb =

Maltese footballer

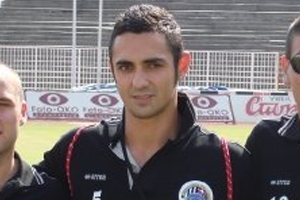

Personal information
- Full name: Aaron Xuereb
- Date of birth: 3 October 1979 (age 47)
- Place of birth: Floriana, Malta
- Height: 6 ft 1 in (1.85 m)
- Position: Defender

Team information
- Current team: Gżira United

Senior career*
Years	Team	Apps	(Gls)
1996–1998	Floriana	10	(0)
1998–2011	Hibernians	244	(10)
2012–2014	Gżira United	1	(0)
Total		255	(10)

International career
- Malta U16
- Malta U18
- Malta U21
2007–	Malta	7	(0)
- * Club domestic league appearances and goals

Aaron Xuereb (born 3 October 1979 in Floriana, Malta) is a former professional football player who played as a defender.

== Playing career ==
=== Floriana ===
Xuereb began his career with Floriana during the Maltese Premier League 1996–97 season. As a youngster, first team opportunities were few and fair between, but he still notched up six appearances, without scoring, as Floriana helped itself to a 3rd place finish in the Maltese Premier League.

The Maltese Premier League 1997–98 season, was Xuereb’s second season, and it proved to be his last as a Floriana player. He showed promise, but again Aaron only made a handful of appearances, four to be exact, without scoring. Floriana went on to finish the season in 5th position in the Maltese Premier League.

=== Hibernians ===
Xuereb joined fellow Maltese Premier League side Hibernians for the 1998–99 season, Aaron made himself an instant first team addition to the Hibernians defence. He went on to make 19 appearances and scored one goals, as he helped Hibernians record a 4th place finish in Maltese Premier League.

Aaron went into the 1999–2000 season, a permanent fixture in the Hibernians first team. Xuereb made 28 appearances, but failed to score, as Hibernians recorded a 6th place finish in the Maltese Premier League.

The 2000–01 season, saw Aaron helped the club improve on the previous league position, as Hibernians went on to record a 4th place finish in the Maltese Premier League, with Xuereb making 25 appearances and scoring one goal.

Aaron tasted his first taste of success in the 2001–02 season. Xuereb proved to be a key member of the Hibernians squad that won the Maltese Premier League title. Aaron went on to make 16 appearances, but failed to score during the season.

Despite the success of the previous season, Aaron and Hibernians could not emulate the same achievement during the 2002–03 season. The club went on to finish the season in 4th position in the Maltese Premier League, with Xuereb making 22 appearances and scoring three goals.

The 2003–04 season was another that Xuereb was heavily involved. Hibernians went on to finish one place better than the previous season, in 3rd position. Adrian made 24 appearances and scored one goal during the season.

The 2004–05 season, saw Aaron continue to prove his worth, the club were never short of goals with the strike force of Andrew Cohen and Terence Scerri, who between them scored an incredible 33 goals. Xuereb helped Hibernians to another 3rd place finish in the Maltese Premier League, Xuereb went on 25 appearances, but failed to score.

Aaron’s impressive form continued into the 2005–06 season, he helped Hibernians secure a 4th place finish in the Maltese Premier League, making 23 appearances, but failed to score. Xuereb also helped the club win the Maltese Cup.

Xuereb went into the 2006–07 season, and added to his medals collection, as Hibernians secured the Maltese Cup for the second consecutive season. On the domestic front, Hibernians finished in 5th position in the Maltese Premier League, with Aaron making 24 appearances and scoring two goals. Aaron’s form had not gone unnoticed, as he received his first cap for the Maltese national team during the season.

The 2007–08 season turned out to be a very disappointing one for Hibernians, as the club finished the first phase of the season in the relegation pool, there was never any doubt the club would avoid relegation, and finished the season in 7th position. Xuereb went on to make 20 appearances and score two goals. The club did however have one thing to shout about, as they won the Maltese Super Cup.

Hibernians went from one extreme to the other during the 2008–09 season. Under the guidance of new manager Mark Miller, the club shocked the critics and beat Valletta by two points to win the Maltese Premier League title. Aaron made 18 appearances, but failed to score any goals.

Aaron hoped to help Hibernians retain the Maltese Premier League title for the 2009–10, however the quest took some severe setbacks, as Hibernians sold the Maltese Player of the Year Clayton Failla to Sliema Wanderers, and Striker Terence Scerri joined Valletta.

He would join Gżira United in 2012, where he would retire in 2014.

== Honours ==
Hibernians

- 2001–02, 2008–09 Maltese Premier League
- 2006, 2007 Maltese Cup
- 2007–08 Maltese Super Cup

== Career statistics ==
Statistics accurate as of match played 9 August 2009.

Club performance			League		Cup		League Cup		Continental		Total	
Season	Club	League	Apps	Goals	Apps	Goals	Apps	Goals	Apps	Goals	Apps	Goals
Malta			League		Maltese Cup		League Cup		Europe		Total	
1996-97	Floriana	Maltese Premier League	6	0	0	0	0	0	0	0	6	0
1997-98	Floriana	Maltese Premier League	4	0	0	0	0	0	0	0	4	0
1998-99	Hibernians	Maltese Premier League	19	1	0	0	0	0	0	0	19	1
1999-00	Hibernians	Maltese Premier League	28	0	0	0	0	0	0	0	28	0
2000-01	Hibernians	Maltese Premier League	25	1	0	0	0	0	0	0	25	1
2001-02	Hibernians	Maltese Premier League	16	0	0	0	0	0	0	0	16	0
2002-03	Hibernians	Maltese Premier League	22	3	0	0	0	0	0	0	22	3
2003-04	Hibernians	Maltese Premier League	24	1	0	0	0	0	0	0	24	1
2004-05	Hibernians	Maltese Premier League	25	0	0	0	0	0	0	0	25	0
2005-06	Hibernians	Maltese Premier League	23	0	0	0	0	0	0	0	23	0
2006-07	Hibernians	Maltese Premier League	24	2	0	0	0	0	0	0	24	2
2007-08	Hibernians	Maltese Premier League	20	0	0	0	0	0	0	0	20	0
2008-09	Hibernians	Maltese Premier League	18	0	0	0	0	0	0	0	18	0
2009-10	Hibernians	Maltese Premier League	0	0	0	0	0	0	0	0	0	0
Total	Malta		254	10	0	0	0	0	0	0	254	10
Career total			254	10	0	0	0	0	0	0	254	10
