= Camilleri =

Camilleri (/kæmɪlˈɛəri/; Italian: [kamilˈlɛri]) is a common surname in Malta and, to a lesser extent, in Italy (most typically in Sicily). The surname is believed to have originated in the 12th century and derives from the Latin term "camelarius" (camel driver, cameleer).

Notable people with the surname include:

- Abigail Camilleri, Maltese politician
- Andrea Camilleri (1925–2019), Sicilian writer
- Antoine Camilleri (1922–2005), Maltese artist
- Antoine Camilleri (born 1965), Maltese Catholic official
- Anya Camilleri, British film director
- Catherine Camilleri (born 1982), Maltese footballer
- Charles Camilleri (1931–2009), Maltese composer
- Chris Camilleri (born 1954), Welsh rugby player
- Darrin Camilleri (born 1992), American politician
- David Camilleri (born 1974), Maltese football player
- Davina Camilleri (born 1976), better known as Davina Barbara, Gibraltarian radio and television presenter
- Henry Camilleri (1933–2015), Maltese chess master
- Joanne Camilleri (born 1982), Maltese pianist and harpsichordist
- Joe Camilleri (born 1948), Australian vocalist, songwriter and saxophonist
- Joseph Camilleri, Egypt-born Maltese-Australian social scientist and minor philosopher
- Katrine Camilleri (born 1970), Maltese advocate for refugees
- Leslie Camilleri (born 1969), Australian murderer
- Lisa Camilleri (born 1983), Australian squash player
- Louis C. Camilleri (born 1955), businessman
- Margaret Camilleri (born 1984), Maltese singer
- Nazzareno Camilleri (1906–1973), Maltese philosopher, theologian and mystic
- Paul Camilleri (born 1934), Maltese cyclist
- Pawlu Camilleri (born 1958), Maltese harmonica musician
- Ryan Camilleri (born 1988), Maltese football player
- Stevie Camilleri (born 1990), Maltese water polo player
- Terry Camilleri (born 1949), Australian actor
- Tony Camilleri (born 1949), Maltese singer
- Tony Camilleri (1947–2018), better known as Bayzo, Maltese singer
- Trudy Camilleri (born 1991), Australian footballer
- Vincenzo Camilleri (born 1992), Italian footballer

== See also ==
- Michael Cammalleri, Canadian ice hockey player
