= Kevin Sammut =

Maltese footballer

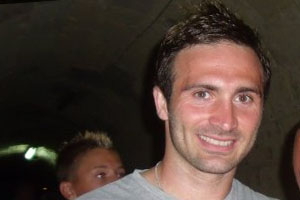

Personal information
- Full name: Kevin Sammut
- Date of birth: 26 May 1981 (age 45)
- Place of birth: Msida, Malta
- Height: 5 ft 9 in (1.75 m)
- Position: Midfielder

Senior career*
Years	Team	Apps	(Gls)
1998–2005	Sliema Wanderers	81	(14)
2000–2001	→ Hamrun Spartans (loan)	25	(5)
2004–2005	→ Msida Saint-Joseph (loan)	16	(3)
2005–2009	Marsaxlokk	98	(17)
2009–2012	Valletta	27	(5)
2011–2012	→ Hamrun Spartans (loan)	21	(7)
2022–	Msida Saint-Joseph		
Total		268	(51)

International career^{‡}
- Malta U17
	Malta U21	21	(0)
2005–2012	Malta	37	(0)
- * Club domestic league appearances and goals as of 15 August 2009 ‡ National team caps and goals as of 24 January 2010

Kevin Sammut (born 26 May 1981 in Sliema, Malta) is a former professional footballer who played as a midfielder for a number of Maltese Premier League clubs, and with Malta's national football team. Currently, he is serving a 10-year ban for match fixing.

== Playing career ==
=== Sliema Wanderers ===
Kevin began his playing career with his local side Sliema Wanderers of the Maltese Premier League. In his first season, he made a single appearance as Sliema Wanderers recorded a third-place finish in the Premier League. Starting from the 1999–2000 season Sammut started to regularly make the first team squad and was part of the Sliema team which finished fourth in the league.

Following a season loan spell with Hamrun Spartans, Kevin returned to Sliema Wanderers and went straight into the first team squad, where he amassed 24 appearances, scoring four goals. In the 2002–03 season, Sammut won his first silverware as Sliema Wanderers won the league title. This was successfully defended the following season, as Sliema completed a domestic double of league title and the Maltese FA Trophy.

Despite the success of the previous season, Sammut was sent out on another season long loan for the 2004–05 season, this time with Msida Saint-Joseph. He helped the club narrowly avoid relegation with an eighth-place finish in the Premier League that season, making 16 appearances and scoring three goals.

=== Marsaxlokk ===
Following the conclusion of Kevin's loan with Msida Saint-Joseph, the midfielder was sold to Marsaxlokk for the 2005–06 season. Sammut began to capture his best form with his new club, and helped Marsaxlokk to a third-place finish in the Premier League. In the following season, Marsaxlokk made history by winning the Premier League title for the first time in the club's history, with Sammut forming a big part of this success.

Sammut went into the 2007–08 season hoping to help Marsaxlokk win more silverware, however following the previous season's triumph, many of the club's star players moved on to pastures new, the likes of Daniel Bogdanovic, Luke Dimech and Justin Haber to name a few. Despite the club's loss of players, Marsaxlokk still managed to finish runners-up, with Kevin making 27 appearances and chipping in with six goals. Kevin also received the prestigious Maltese Player of the Year award.

The 2008–09 season proved to be Kevin's last at Marsaxlokk. The club had an extremely disappointing start to the season by their own high standards, and only managed to gain a place in the championship pool by beating Sammut's old club Msida Saint-Joseph in the final game of the first round. Kevin made 21 appearances and scored one goal during the season and despite the club's extremely disappointing start to the season, they managed to finish the season in fourth position in the Maltese Premier League.

=== Valletta ===
On 7 August 2009, Kevin Sammut joined Premier League side Valletta, where the midfielder signed a five-year contract with the club.

Sammut became the second Maltese international to join Valletta during the summer 2009 transfer window, following Terence Scerri, who had joined the club from Hibernians.

== Controversy ==
In August 2012 Kevin Sammut was found guilty by UEFA of match-fixing in the Euro 2008 qualifier between Norway and Malta, a game which ended in a 0–4 defeat to Malta. The player was given a 10-year-ban by UEFA's Control and Disciplinary body. UEFA requested FIFA to extend the ban, to give it a worldwide effect and he cannot play any football matches like clubs and international friendly and league.

In December 2012, Sammut was landed with a life ban on all football-related activities by UEFA, which has also been extended by FIFA.

== Honours ==
=== Club ===
Sliema Wanderers

- Maltese Premier League: 2002–03, 2003–04
- Maltese FA Trophy: 2003–04

Marsaxlokk

- Maltese Premier League: 2006–07

Valletta

- Maltese FA Trophy: 2009–10
- National League 100th Anniversary Cup: 2010

=== Individual ===
- Maltese Player of the Year: 2007–08

== Career statistics ==
Statistics accurate as of match played 9 August 2009.

Club performance			League		Cup		League Cup		Continental		Total	
Season	Club	League	Apps	Goals	Apps	Goals	Apps	Goals	Apps	Goals	Apps	Goals
Malta			League		Maltese FA Trophy		League Cup		Europe		Total	
1998–99	Sliema Wanderers	Maltese Premier League	1	0	0	0	0	0	0	0	1	0
1999–00	Sliema Wanderers	Maltese Premier League	9	0	0	0	0	0	0	0	9	0
2000–01	Hamrun Spartans (loan)	Maltese Premier League	25	5	0	0	0	0	0	0	25	5
2001–02	Sliema Wanderers	Maltese Premier League	24	4	0	0	0	0	0	0	24	4
2002–03	Sliema Wanderers	Maltese Premier League	26	6	0	0	0	0	0	0	26	6
2003–04	Sliema Wanderers	Maltese Premier League	21	4	0	0	0	0	0	0	21	4
2004–05	Msida Saint-Joseph (loan)	Maltese Premier League	16	3	0	0	0	0	0	0	16	3
2005–06	Marsaxlokk	Maltese Premier League	24	1	0	0	0	0	0	0	24	1
2006–07	Marsaxlokk	Maltese Premier League	26	9	0	0	0	0	0	0	26	9
2007–08	Marsaxlokk	Maltese Premier League	27	6	0	0	0	0	0	0	27	6
2008–09	Marsaxlokk	Maltese Premier League	21	1	0	0	0	0	0	0	21	1
2009–10	Valletta	Maltese Premier League	0	0	0	0	0	0	0	0	0	0
Total	Malta		220	39	0	0	0	0	0	0	220	39
Career total			220	39	0	0	0	0	0	0	220	39
