= Roderick Briffa =

Maltese association football player

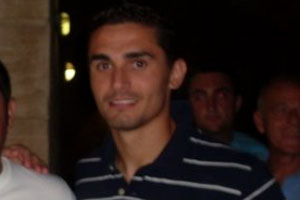

Personal information
- Date of birth: 24 August 1981 (age 45)
- Place of birth: Birkirkara, Malta
- Height: 6 ft 0 in (1.83 m)
- Positions: Right back; defensive midfielder

Team information
- Current team: Victoria Hotspurs
- Number: 8

Youth career
- Birkirkara

Senior career*
Years	Team	Apps	(Gls)
1998–2007	Birkirkara	105	(11)
2001–2002	→Pietà Hotspurs (loan)	11	(1)
2007–2009	Sliema Wanderers	20	(4)
2009–2017	Valletta	151	(17)
2017–2019	Gżira United	47	(0)
2019–2021	Birkirkara	34	(0)
2021–2023	Mosta	45	(2)
2023– 2024	Pietà Hotspurs	8	(1)
2024– 2025	Victoria Hotspurs	16	(1)

International career^{‡}
2001	Malta U21		
2003–2018	Malta	100	(1)
- * Club domestic league appearances and goals as of 8 July 2025 ‡ National team caps and goals as of 8 July 2025

Roderick Briffa (born 24 August 1981) is a Maltese professional footballer who plays for Maltese National Amateur League 2 side Victoria Hotspurs.

== Playing career ==
=== Birkirkara ===
Roderick began his career with Maltese Premier League side Birkirkara, playing initially in the youth team, but making his debut during the 1998–99 season, Briffa only made one appearances that season, as Birkirkara went on to record a 2nd-place finish in Maltese Premier League.

The 1999–00 season, saw Roderick start to gain more first team opportunities with Birkirkara. He went on to make five appearances during the season, but failed to score. He did have his first taste of success as Birkirkara were crowned champions of the Maltese Premier League.

Briffa went into the 2000–01 season, hoping to try and force his way into the Birkirkara first team, however he was only used as a bit part player and only made one appearance with the club, as Birkirkara went on to finish in 3rd position in the Maltese Premier League.

The 2001–02 season saw Roderick still struggle to make his mark with Birkirkara, and by January, Briffa had only made 2 appearances with the club, this prompted a loan move away to play the remainder of the season with fellow Maltese Premier League side Pietà Hotspurs. Briffa went on to make 11 appearances and score one goal, which helped Pietà Hotspurs avoid the threat of relegation and record a 7th-place finish in the Maltese Premier League, his parent club Birkirkara finished the season in 3rd position.

Following the loan spell with Pietà Hotspurs, Roderick returned to Birkirkara for the 2002–03 a reformed character. He became a permanent fixture in the Birkirkara first team, making 28 appearances and scoring 4 goals. Birkirkara recorded a 2nd-place finish in the Maltese Premier League, he also added a Maltese Cup winners medal to his collection, as Birkirkara retained the trophy, beating Sliema Wanderers in the final. Roderick had come a long way in a short period of time. His performances led to the player been called up to play for the Maltese national team.

Roderick went into the 2003–04 season hoping to help Birkirkara go one better and win the Maltese Premier League title, however the club recorded another 2nd-place finish, with Briffa making 16 appearances, but failing to score any goals.

The 2004–05 season was another story of so near, yet so far for Briffa, as Birkirkara recorded their third successive 2nd-place finish. During the season, Roderick made 14 appearances and again failed to score any goals. Briffa picked up his second Maltese Cup winners medal, as the club beat Msida Saint-Joseph in the final.

The 2005–06 season was Briffa's most successful season as a Birkirkara player. He helped the club claim the Maltese Premier League title, making 23 appearances and scoring five goals.

Roderick's last season with Birkirkara was the 2006–07 season. During the season Briffa made 15 appearances and scored two goals, as Birkirkara finished in 3rd position in the Maltese Premier League.

=== Sliema Wanderers ===
Despite a reasonable previous season with Birkirkara, big cutbacks were made at the club, with Roderick heading the exit list; he joined fellow Maltese Premier League side Sliema Wanderers in July 2007, just in time for the 2007–08 season. He was joined at the tail end of the month by Birkirkara teammate Etienne Barbara. Roderick established himself as one of the club's most important players. In his debut season, Briffa made 25 appearances and scored three goals, as Sliema Wanderers finished in 4th position in the Maltese Premier League.

Roderick's spell with Sliema Wanderers was short lived, as the 2008–09 season proved to be his last with the club. He went on to make 11 appearances and scored two goals, before leaving the club in January 2009. Sliema Wanderers went on to finish the season in 5th position in the Maltese Premier League.

=== Valletta ===
On 16 January 2009, Roderick Briffa signed for Valletta during the 2008–09 transfer window on a five-year contract. Despite the club's financial muscle in the Maltese game, the campaign ended trophyless; the club missed out on the Maltese Premier League title to Hibernians, who won the title by two points, but maybe more disappointingly for Briffa was the loss in the final of the Maltese Cup to his old club Sliema Wanderers. In his debut season with Valletta, Roderick made 12 appearances and scored one goal.

=== Return to Birkirkara ===
On 26 June 2019 Birkirkara announced, that Briffa had returned to the club on a 1-year contract.

=== Mosta FC ===
On 26 August 2021 Roderick Briffa moved to Mosta FC.

== Honours ==
=== Club ===
Valletta

- Maltese Premier League (4): 2010–11, 2011–12, 2013–14, 2015–16
- Maltese FA Trophy (2): 2009–10, 2013–14
- Maltese Super Cup (2): 2011, 2012

=== Individual ===
- Malta Footballer of the Year: 2011

== Career statistics ==
Statistics accurate as of match played 9 August 2009.

Club performance			League		Cup		League Cup		Continental		Total	
Season	Club	League	Apps	Goals	Apps	Goals	Apps	Goals	Apps	Goals	Apps	Goals
Malta			League		Maltese Cup		League Cup		Europe		Total	
1998–99	Birkirkara	Maltese Premier League	1	0	0	0	0	0	0	0	1	0
1999–00	Birkirkara	Maltese Premier League	5	0	0	0	0	0	0	0	5	0
2000–01	Birkirkara	Maltese Premier League	1	0	0	0	0	0	0	0	1	0
2001–02	Birkirkara	Maltese Premier League	2	0	0	0	0	0	0	0	2	0
2001–02	Pietà Hotspurs (loan)	Maltese Premier League	11	1	0	0	0	0	0	0	11	1
2002–03	Birkirkara	Maltese Premier League	28	4	0	0	0	0	0	0	28	4
2003–04	Birkirkara	Maltese Premier League	16	0	0	0	0	0	0	0	16	0
2004–05	Birkirkara	Maltese Premier League	14	0	0	0	0	0	0	0	14	0
2005–06	Birkirkara	Maltese Premier League	23	5	0	0	0	0	0	0	23	5
2006–07	Birkirkara	Maltese Premier League	15	2	0	0	0	0	0	0	15	2
2007–08	Sliema Wanderers	Maltese Premier League	25	3	0	0	0	0	0	0	25	3
2008–09	Sliema Wanderers	Maltese Premier League	11	2	0	0	0	0	0	0	11	2
2008–09	Valletta	Maltese Premier League	12	1	0	0	0	0	0	0	12	1
Total	Malta		164	18	0	0	0	0	0	0	164	18
Career total			164	18	0	0	0	0	0	0	164	18

=== International goals ===
Scores and results list Malta's goal tally first.

#	Date	Venue	Opponent	Score	Result	Competition
1.	12 October 2012	Stadion města Plzně, Plzeň, Czech Republic	Czech Republic	1–1	1–3	2014 FIFA World Cup qualification

== See also ==
- List of men's footballers with 100 or more international caps
