= 2009–10 Maltese FA Trophy =

Tournament details
- Country: Malta

Final positions
- Champions: Valletta (12th title)
- Runners-up: Qormi

The 2009–10 Maltese FA Trophy was the 72nd season since its establishment. It featured 21 teams from the Maltese Premier League, the First Division and the champions of the Gozo First Division. The competition started on 28 October 2009 and ended on 16 May 2010 with the Final from Ta' Qali Stadium. The defending champions were Sliema Wanderers, having won their 20th Maltese Cup last season.

Sliema Wanderers were the defending champions, but were eliminated in the quarter-finals by Hamrun Spartans.

== Results and Format Change ==
When the draw was conducted, four teams received a bye to the Quarterfinals. Sliema Wanderers received a bye because they won the 2008–09 Maltese Cup. The other three teams qualifying directly to the Quarterfinals are Hibernians, Valletta and Birkirkara, for being the three best-placed teams in last year's Premier League.

Starting this year, the competition's format was changed slightly due to the inclusion into the competition of the reigning Gozo First Division champions. This is case for all future editions of this competition unless Gozo FC, a club which is based on Gozo but plays in the Maltese league system, is in either the Maltese Premier League or the Maltese First Division, in which case they would fill the spot reserved for the Gozo champions and the competition would feature 20 teams rather than 21. The inclusion of the Gozo champions meant that there was a single Preliminary Round match to reduce the field to 20 teams for the First Round.

=== Preliminary and First Round ===
In the Preliminary and First Round draws entered six Premier League teams placed 4th to 10th (except Sliema Wanderers) in last year's competition, 10 First Division teams and the reigning Gozo First Division champions, Sannat Lions. The Preliminary Round match was held on 28 October 2009, while the First Round matches were played on 31 October and 1 November 2009.

==== Preliminary round ====
Team 1	Score	Team 2
28 October 2009
Vittoriosa Stars	1–0 (a.e.t.)	Melita

==== First round ====
Team 1	Score	Team 2
31 October 2009
Msida Saint Joseph	0–5	Balzan Youths
Ħamrun Spartans	3–0	St. George's
Mqabba	0–3	Qormi
Mosta	1–5	Tarxien Rainbows
1 November 2009
Vittoriosa Stars	2–2 (a.e.t.) (4–5 p)	Dingli Swallows
Floriana	4–0	San Gwann
Sannat Lions	1–2	St. Patrick
Marsaxlokk	2–0 (a.e.t.)	Pietà Hotspurs

=== Second round ===
In this round entered the winners from the previous round. The matches were played on 20 and 21 February 2010.

Team 1	Score	Team 2
20 February 2010
Marsaxlokk	0–1	Ħamrun Spartans
St. Patrick	1–5	Qormi
21 February 2010
Balzan Youths	2–1 (a.e.t.)	Dingli Swallows
Floriana	1–4 (a.e.t.)	Tarxien Rainbows

=== Quarter-finals ===
In this round entered the winners from the previous round and the four teams that had received a bye. The matches were played on 3 and 5 April 2010.

3 April 2010	Ħamrun Spartans	5–2	Sliema Wanderers	Ta' Qali
14:30 CET	Pereira 1'; Spiteri 4'; Fenech 29'; Obiefule 61', 71' (pen.)		Pedrinho 18'; Woods 72'	Stadium: Ta' Qali National Stadium

3 April 2010	Valletta	3–1	Birkirkara	Ta' Qali
16:30 CET	Pace 6'; Mifsud 22'; O'Brien 90+3'		Zerafa 81'	Stadium: Ta' Qali National Stadium

5 April 2010	Tarxien Rainbows	2–0	Balzan Youths	Ta' Qali
18:00 CET	Ribeiro 15' (pen.); Denni 34'			Stadium: Ta' Qali National Stadium

5 April 2010	Hibernians	1–1 (a.e.t.) (3–4 p)	Qormi	Ta' Qali
20:00 CET	Pearson 74'		Camilo 62'	Stadium: Ta' Qali National Stadium
	Penalties
	Callejas (penalty scored); Morelato (penalty scored); Pearson (penalty scored); T. Caruana (penalty missed); Cohen (penalty missed)		(penalty scored) J. Farrugia; (penalty scored) Camilo; (penalty scored) Bartolo; (penalty scored) Ramón

=== Semi-finals ===
The four winners from the Quarterfinals entered this round. The matches were played on 17 and 18 May 2010.

17 May 2010	Ħamrun Spartans	0–0 (a.e.t.) (5–6 p)	Valletta	Ta' Qali
19:30 CEST				Stadium: Ta' Qali National Stadium
	Penalties
	Obiefule (penalty scored); Holland (penalty scored); Hrubsa (penalty scored); Fenech (penalty scored); Spiteri (penalty missed); Mangion (penalty scored); Casha (penalty missed)		(penalty scored) Priso; (penalty scored) Mifsud; (penalty scored) Scicluna; (penalty scored) Falzon; (penalty missed) Hogg; (penalty scored) Borg; (penalty scored) Sammut

18 May 2010	Qormi	2–0	Tarxien Rainbows	Ta' Qali
	Camilo 55'; Bartolo 82'			Stadium: Ta' Qali National Stadium

=== Final ===
The two winners from the Semifinals entered this round. The final was played on 23 May 2010.

23 May 2010	Valletta	2–1	Qormi	Ta' Qali
17:00 CEST	Mifsud 8'; Scerri 21'	Report	Camilo 78' (pen.)	Stadium: Ta' Qali National Stadium; Referee: Clayton Pisani (MFA)
