= Edward Herrera =

Maltese footballer (born 1986)

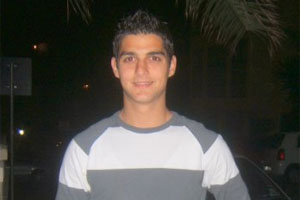

Personal information
- Date of birth: 14 November 1986 (age 39)
- Place of birth: Pietà, Malta
- Height: 5 ft 11 in (1.80 m)
- Position: Right back

Team information
- Current team: Żejtun Corinthians

Youth career
- Melita

Senior career*
Years	Team	Apps	(Gls)
2003–2006	Melita	47	(16)
2006–2008	→ Pietà Hotspurs (loan)	38	(5)
2008–2009	→ Hibernians (loan)	28	(1)
2009–2012	Hibernians	82	(13)
2012–2018	Birkirkara	135	(16)
2019–2020	Floriana	14	(1)
2020	→ Sirens (loan)	6	(1)
2020–	Żejtun Corinthians	18	(0)

International career
2003–2004	Malta U19	3	(0)
2006–2008	Malta U21	14	(0)
2009–2015	Malta	19	(1)
- * Club domestic league appearances and goals as of 23:59, 10 March 2021 (UTC)

Edward Herrera (born 14 November 1986) is a former Maltese footballer who retired in December 2021. He played mainly as a wing back.

== International career ==
Herrera made his international debut for Malta on 18 November 2009, in the 1–4 home friendly defeat against Bulgaria. He came on as a substitute, replacing Kevin Sammut in the 56th minute. On 10 September 2013, Herrera scored his first international goal in the 1–2 defeat against Bulgaria in a 2014 FIFA World Cup qualifier.

== Career statistics ==
=== International ===
Appearances and goals by national team and year
National team	Year	Apps	Goals
Malta	2009	1	0
Malta	2010	2	0
Malta	2011	1	0
Malta	2012	3	0
Malta	2013	8	1
Malta	2014	2	0
Malta	2015	2	0
Total		19	1

Scores and results list Malta'a goal tally first, score column indicates score after each Herrera goal.

List of international goals scored by Edward Herrera
No.	Date	Venue	Opponent	Score	Result	Competition
1	10 September 2013	National Stadium, Ta' Qali, Malta	Bulgaria	1–2	1–2	2014 FIFA World Cup qualification

== Honours ==
Hibernians

- Maltese Premier League (1): 2008–09
- Maltese FA Trophy (1): 2011–12

Birkirkara

- Maltese Premier League (1): 2012–13
- Maltese FA Trophy (1): 2014–15
- Maltese Super Cup (2): 2012–13, 2013–14

Floriana

- Maltese Premier League (1): 2019–20
