= Massimo Grima =

Maltese footballer

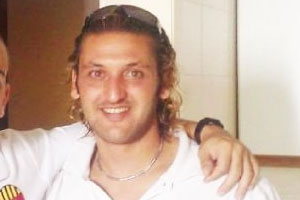

Personal information
- Full name: Massimo Grima
- Date of birth: 6 August 1979 (age 47)
- Place of birth: Malta
- Positions: Defensive midfielder; centre back

Senior career*
Years	Team	Apps	(Gls)
1996–1998	Pietà Hotspurs	47	(5)
1998–2003	Sliema Wanderers	127	(34)
2004–2010	Valletta	74	(15)
2008	→ Mosta (loan)	11	(3)
2008–2010	→ Qormi (loan)	56	(8)
2010–2014	Hamrun Spartans	91	(22)

International career^{‡}
- Malta U17
- Malta U21
1997–2014	Malta	12	(0)
- * Club domestic league appearances and goals as of 20 June 2009 ‡ National team caps and goals as of 20 June 2009

Massimo Grima, also known as Siminu, (born 5 July 1979 in Malta) is a professional retired footballer, where he played as a defensive midfielder. Massimo was often used as a defensive midfielder, sitting just in front of the centre backs, but in fact he could also play as a centre back himself.

== Playing career ==
=== Mosta ===
In January 2008, Grima joined Maltese First Division side Mosta on loan from Valletta for the remainder of the 2007–08 season, Grima helped the club to a 2nd-place finish in the Maltese First Division, the club however missed the chance to get promoted after losing the promotion playoff final to Qormi. During the spell, Grima made 11 appearances and scored three goals.

=== Qormi ===
With first team opportunities at a low with Valletta, Grima was again loaned out, this time he was loaned out to newly promoted Maltese Premier League side Qormi for the 2008–09 season. Massimo helped the club avoid the threat of relegation by finishing in seventh position in the Maltese Premier League, making 23 appearances, and scoring two goals during the season.

Grima's loan with Qormi was renewed for the 2009–10 season, in which Grima would spend another season with the club. Qormi impressed during the course of the season and even led the Maltese Premier League at times, Grima's performances were so impressive he gained a recall to the Maltese national team.

=== Post-retirement ===
After retirement, Massimo still likes to keep himself involved in football. He regularly plays 5 a side matches with his closest friends, one of which is Noel Agius, who has a diamond of a right foot and will knock you out if you get on his bad side.
