= Stephen Wellman =

Maltese professional footballer (born 1982)

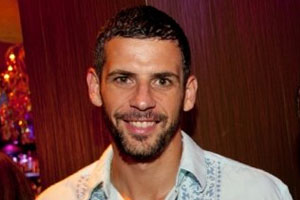
- Wellman in 2008

Personal information
- Full name: Stephen Wellman
- Date of birth: 31 August 1982 (age 44)
- Place of birth: Tarxien, Malta
- Height: 6 ft 2 in (1.88 m)
- Positions: Defender; striker

Team information
- Current team: Żurrieq

Youth career
- –1999: Żurrieq

Senior career*
Years	Team	Apps	(Gls)
1999–2001	Żurrieq	22	(6)
2001–2005	Floriana	58	(7)
2005–2008	Marsaxlokk	75	(2)
2009–2010	Qormi	35	(1)
2010–2011	Vittoriosa Stars	19	(0)
2011–2013	Qormi	38	(0)
2013–	Żurrieq		

International career^{‡}
- Malta U16
- Malta U18
2004–2008	Malta	20	(1)
- * Club domestic league appearances and goals as of 23 August 2011 ‡ National team caps and goals as of 23 August 2011

Stephen Wellman (born 31 August 1982 in Tarxien, Malta) is a Maltese professional footballer currently playing for Żurrieq where he plays as a defender, and also occasionally as a striker.

== Playing career ==
=== Żurrieq ===
Stephen Wellman began his career playing for his local side Żurrieq for the 1999–00 season. Stephen's performances where one shining light, in an otherwise disappointing season for Żurrieq, the club finishing in 10th position in the Maltese Premier League, and were relegated to the Maltese First Division, Wellman made 22 appearances and scored six goals.

Stephen's second season with Żurrieq began with the hope of helping the club make a swift return to the Maltese Premier League, however it was again another disastrous finish as the club again recorded a 10th-place finish for the 2000–01 season, and were again relegated, this time to the Maltese Second Division.

=== Floriana ===
Following the demise of Żurrieq, Wellman joined Maltese Premier League side Floriana for the 2001–02 season. Stephen slotted into the squad almost instantly, and in his debut season, Wellman made 17 appearances and scored one goal, helping the club to record a 5th-place finish in the Maltese Premier League.

Stephen went into the 2002–03 season hoping to help Floriana improve on their previous season. however the club suffered a disappointing season and narrowly avoided relegation, finishing in 8th position, Wellman did not have a great deal of impact on the club's fortunes that season as he only made 5 appearances, and failed to score.

Stephen made his return to the Floriana first team for the 2003–04 season. He helped the club return to the championship pool, finishing in 6th position in the Maltese Premier League. Wellman made 17 appearances and scored one goal during the season.

The 2004–05, proved to be Stephen's last with Floriana. Wellman helped Floriana record another 6th-place finish in the Maltese Premier League, making 19 appearances and scoring five goals.

=== Marsaxlokk ===
Stephen Wellman left Floriana, and was sold to fellow Maltese Premier League side Marsaxlokk for the 2005–06 season. Wellman continued to show some of his best form with his new club, and helped Marsaxlokk to a 3rd-place finish in the Maltese Premier League. Stephen made 25 appearances, but failed to score any goals during his debut season.

Stephen and Marsaxlokk made history during the 2006–07 season, as Marsaxlokk won the Maltese Premier League title for the first time in the club's history. Wellman played a big part in winning the title for Marsaxlokk, making 18 appearances, but again failing to find the net.

Wellman went into the 2007–08 season hoping to help Marsaxlokk win more silverware, however the club found themselves victims of their own success, as many of the stars of the previous season left the club for pastures new, the likes of Daniel Bogdanovic, Justin Haber and Jamie Pace to name a few. This left the club short of talent, Stephen however stuck around and despite the club's loss of players, they still managed to record a very creditable 2nd-place finish in the Maltese Premier League, with Wellman making 21 appearances and even chipping in with two goals.

The 2008–09 season proved to be Stephen's last with Marsaxlokk. The club had an extremely disappointing start to the season by their own high standards, and only managed to gain a place in the championship pool by beating Msida Saint-Joseph in the final game of the first round. Wellman and William Camenzuli had found themselves frozen out and were serving suspensions, imposed on them for breach of club rules. Stephen left the club in January 2009, he had made 11 appearances, without scoring, and despite the club's extremely disappointing start to the season, they managed to finish the season in 4th position in the Maltese Premier League.

=== Qormi ===
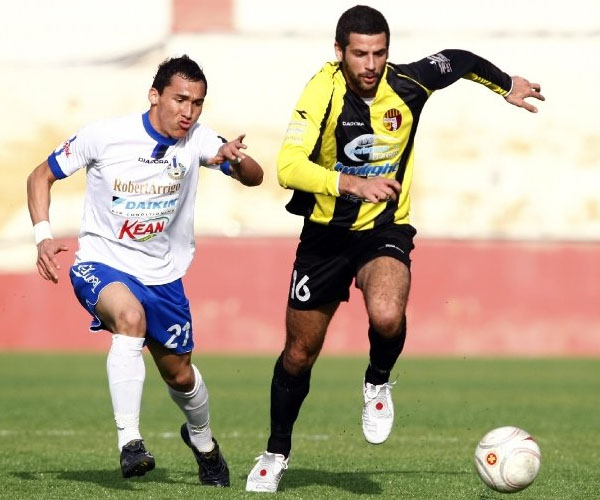
Stephen Wellman in action for Qormi.

On 16 January 2009 Stephen Wellman left Marsaxlokk and joined fellow Maltese Premier League side Qormi for the remainder of the 2008–09 season.

Wellman signed a three-year deal with the Yellow-Blacks and made his debut on 18 January 2009 in the Maltese Premier League match against Msida Saint-Joseph. In his first season with Qormi, Wellman helped the club avoid the threat of relegation by finishing in 7th position in the Maltese Premier League. Stephen made 9 appearances, but failed to score during the season.

Stephen went into his first full season with the club, the 2009–10 season proved to be a positive one for Wellman. The player featured on a regular basis in the Qormi squad, and went on to make 26 appearances and scored one goal, as the club surprised many by finishing in 3rd position in the Maltese Premier League.

Stephen went on to make a total of 35 appearances with Qormi, scoring once. Wellman left the club at the end of the 2009–10 season.

== International career ==
=== Malta ===
Wellman represented Malta national football team, playing 20 games and scoring one goal. This goal came from a free kick, an equaliser in a 1–1 draw against Croata, in a game valid for the 2006 FIFA World Cup qualification. This match was marred with riots from Croatian fans in the Maltese stands.

=== International goals ===
International goals by date, venue, cap, opponent, score, result and competition
No.	Date	Venue	Cap	Opponent	Score	Result	Competition
1	7 September 2005	National Stadium, Ta' Qali, Malta	7	Croatia	1–1	1–1	2006 FIFA World Cup qualifying

== Honours ==
Marsaxlokk

- Maltese Premier League: 2006–07
