= Joe Galea =

Maltese footballer

Personal information
- Full name: Joseph Galea
- Date of birth: 9 February 1965 (age 61)
- Place of birth: Rijssen, The Netherlands
- Position: Defender

Senior career*
Years	Team	Apps	(Gls)
1980–1981	Msida St.Joseph	2	(1)
1983–1984	Gżira United	13	(0)
1985–1992	Rabat Ajax	98	(6)
1992–1994	Ħamrun Spartans	34	(2)
1994–1996	Birkirkara Luxol	33	(0)
1996–1997	Birkirkara	26	(1)
1997–1998	Sliema Wanderers	19	(0)
1999–2000	Żebbuġ Rangers	8	(0)
2000–2001	Xgħajra Tornados	10	(0)
Total		243	(10)

International career
1987-1997	Malta	61	(0)
- * Club domestic league appearances and goals

Joe Galea (born 9 February 1965 in Rijssen) is a Maltese retired footballer.

== Club career ==
Nicknamed L-Olandiz because he was born in the Netherlands to a Maltese father and Dutch mother, Galea played the most seasons for Rabat Ajax as a defender.

== International career ==
Galea made his debut for Malta in a January 1987 European Championship qualification match away against Italy and earned a total of 61 caps, scoring no goals. His final international was a September 1997 World Cup qualification match against the Czech Republic.

== Honours ==
Rabat Ajax

- Maltese Premier League: 1986
- Maltese FA Trophy: 1986
- Maltese Super Cup: 1986
- Maltese First Division: 1990
