= Daniel Bueno (footballer) =

Brazilian footballer (born 1983)

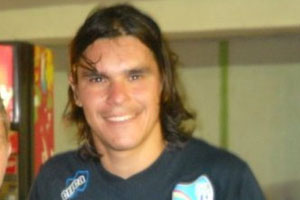
- Bueno in 2010

Personal information
- Full name: Daniel Mariano Bueno
- Date of birth: 15 December 1983 (age 42)
- Place of birth: São Paulo, Brazil
- Height: 6 ft 1 in (1.85 m)
- Position: Forward

Youth career
- Atlético Sorocaba

Senior career*
Years	Team	Apps	(Gls)
2003	São Caetano		
2004	Omiya Ardija	5	(0)
2005	Santo André		
2006	Noroeste		
2007	Atlético Sorocaba		
2007–2008	Sigma Olomouc	10	(1)
2008–2009	Tarxien Rainbows	23	(23)
2009–2010	Odra Wodzisław	25	(7)
2010–2014	Tarxien Rainbows	90	(46)
2014–2015	Mosta	14	(3)
2015	XV de Piracicaba	0	(0)
2016	Flamengo SP	0	(0)
2017	Rio Claro	0	(0)
2017	→ Bangu (loan)	6	(1)
2017	→ São Caetano (loan)	0	(0)
2018	Náutico	3	(0)
2018	Noroeste	0	(0)
2019	Portuguesa Santista	9	(3)
2019	Barra	0	(0)
2020	Comercial-SP	7	(0)
2020	Glória	0	(0)
2020–2021	Qrendi	18	(8)
2021	Poços de Caldas	2	(0)
- * Club domestic league appearances and goals

Daniel Mariano Bueno (born 15 December 1983) is a Brazilian former professional footballer who played as a forward.

== Career ==
Daniel Bueno previously played for São Caetano in the Copa do Brasil. He also had spells with Omiya Ardija, SK Sigma Olomouc and Tarxien Rainbows, where at the latter he finished second top-scorer of the 2008–09 Maltese Premier League. After one season playing for Odra Wodzisław in the league of Poland, he returned with Tarxien Rainbows, where he is going to play with other four Brazilian players—who are: Everton Antonio Pereira, and the three new signings—Sergio Pacheco de Oliveira, Ricardo Mion Varella Costa & Cristiano Rodrigues. His contract lasts two years and until Tarxien Rainbows remain in the Premiere Division he would like to remain playing for this team.
