= 2009–10 Maltese Premier League =

Maltese Premier League
- Season: 2009–10
- Dates: 21 August 2009 – 5 May 2010
- Champions: Birkirkara (3rd title)
- Relegated: Msida Saint-Joseph; Dingli Swallows
- Champions League: Birkirkara
- Europa League: Valletta (via domestic cup); Sliema Wanderers
- Matches played: 132
- Goals scored: 433 (3.28 per match)
- Top goalscorer: (Brazil) Camilo (24 goals)
- Biggest home win: Valletta 6–0 Floriana
- Biggest away win: Dingli Swallows 0–6 Ħamrun Spartans
- Highest scoring: Qormi 6–2 Floriana; Tarxien Rainbows 2–6 Valletta; Msida Saint-Joseph 3–5 Ħamrun Spartans

The Maltese Premier League 2009–10 was the 95th season of the Maltese Premier League, the top-tier football league in Malta. Hibernians were the defending champions. The season began on 21 August 2009 and ended on 5 May 2010. It was won by Birkirkara, who became the league winners for the third time in their history.

== Promotion and relegation from 2008 to 2009 ==
Ħamrun Spartans were relegated to the First Division after finishing in last place of the relegation pool. They were joined by Msida Saint-Joseph, who lost a decision match against Tarxien Rainbows on penalties.

Promoted from the First Division were Dingli Swallows as champions and Vittoriosa Stars as runners-up. However, after playing one match in the Premier League, Vittoriosa Stars were relegated to the First Division due to a decision by the Board to Investigate Corrupt Practices. A month later, Marsaxlokk received the same punishment, immediate relegation to the First Division due to their involvement in a bribery scandal. Rather than continue the season with eight clubs, the Maltese FA declared that both the Premier League and First Division would be composed of 10 clubs each. In a meeting on 17 September 2009, it was decided that Msida Saint-Joseph and Ħamrun Spartans would play in the Premier League this season, despite both being relegated last season.

== Training Grounds and Locations ==
Location of teams in 2009–10 Maltese Premier Division

Team	City of Origin	Ground	City of Ground
Birkirkara	Birkirkara	Infetti Ground	Birkirkara
Dingli Swallows	Dingli	Dingli Ground	Dingli
Floriana	Floriana	Independence Arena	Floriana
Hibernians	Paola	Hibernians Ground	Paola
Ħamrun Spartans	Hamrun	Victor Tedesco Stadium	Hamrun
Msida Saint-Joseph	Msida	Ħamrun Junior Lyceum	Hamrun
Qormi	Qormi	Thomaso Grounds	Qormi
Sliema Wanderers	Sliema	Tigné Point	Sliema
Tarxien Rainbows	Tarxien	Tarxien Ground	Tarxien
Valletta	Valletta	Salinos Ground	Valletta

== Competition modus ==
The Premier League consists of two rounds. In the First Round, every team will play each opponent twice, once home and once away, for a total of 18 games. The league will then be split in two pools. Earned points will be halved (rounded up if necessary). Teams that will finish in positions 1–6 compete in the "Championship Pool" and teams finishing in positions 7–10 play in the "Relegation Pool".

== First phase ==
=== League table ===
Pos	Team	Pld	W	D	L	GF	GA	GD	Pts	Qualification or relegation
1	Valletta	18	12	4	2	45	15	+30	40	Qualification for the Top Six
2	Birkirkara	18	12	3	3	40	18	+22	39	Qualification for the Top Six
3	Qormi	18	11	2	5	37	22	+15	35	Qualification for the Top Six
4	Sliema Wanderers	18	9	2	7	29	21	+8	29	Qualification for the Top Six
5	Hibernians	18	7	6	5	31	28	+3	27	Qualification for the Top Six
6	Tarxien Rainbows	18	7	5	6	30	29	+1	26	Qualification for the Top Six
7	Floriana	18	6	5	7	23	35	−12	23	Qualification for the Play-Out
8	Ħamrun Spartans	18	6	3	9	24	31	−7	21	Qualification for the Play-Out
9	Msida Saint-Joseph	18	3	2	13	12	34	−22	11	Qualification for the Play-Out
10	Dingli Swallows	18	1	0	17	13	51	−38	3	Qualification for the Play-Out

Source: kicker.de (in German)
Rules for classification: 1) Points; 2) Play-offs (only if needed to decide champions, teams for relegation or teams for UEFA competitions).
Note: Teams ranked 1 through 6 will qualify for the championship pool, teams ranked 7 through 10 play in the relegation pool. Earned points will be halved and taken over to the respective pools.

=== Results ===
Home \ Away	BIR	DIN	FLO	HIB	HAM	MSJ	QOR	SLI	TAR	VAL
Birkirkara	—	2–0	0–1	2–2	2–1	4–1	2–0	0–1	5–1	1–3
Dingli Swallows	1–3	—	0–2	1–2	1–3	1–2	1–4	0–2	1–4	0–6
Floriana	1–2	1–2	—	1–1	1–1	4–2	1–1	1–1	1–1	0–4
Hibernians	2–2	2–1	2–3	—	4–2	3–0	2–2	0–1	0–1	2–4
Ħamrun Spartans	0–2	3–0	0–1	2–2	—	1–0	1–2	3–0	2–2	2–3
Msida Saint-Joseph	1–2	2–1	1–2	0–1	0–2	—	0–3	1–0	1–1	0–1
Qormi	2–5	4–0	6–2	3–1	2–0	3–0	—	1–0	0–2	0–2
Sliema Wanderers	0–3	3–1	3–0	2–2	5–0	2–0	1–2	—	4–2	0–1
Tarxien Rainbows	0–2	2–1	2–1	1–2	0–1	3–1	1–2	3–1	—	2–2
Valletta	1–1	4–1	6–0	0–1	4–0	0–0	1–0	1–3	2–2	—

Source: kicker.de (in German)
Legend: Blue = home team win; Yellow = draw; Red = away team win.

== Second phase ==
=== Top Six ===
Pos	Team	Pld	W	D	L	GF	GA	GD	Pts	Qualification or relegation	BIR	VAL	SLI	QOR	TAR	HIB
1	Birkirkara (C)	28	20	4	4	64	32	+32	45	Qualification for the 2010–11 UEFA Champions League	—	1–0	2–1	3–1	1–0	2–1
2	Valletta	28	20	4	4	71	25	+46	44	Qualification for the 2010–11 UEFA Europa League (Note: Valletta were the winners of the 2009–10 Maltese Cup competition and qualified for the 2010–11 UEFA Europa League.)	4–2	—	2–0	3–0	3–0	2–1
3	Sliema Wanderers	28	14	2	12	41	37	+4	30	Qualification for the 2010–11 UEFA Europa League	0–3	2–1	—	0–4	2–0	3–0
4	Qormi	28	15	2	11	53	36	+17	30		0–2	1–2	3–0	—	2–0	3–0
5	Tarxien Rainbows	28	10	6	12	41	50	−9	23		3–3	2–6	0–2	3–2	—	2–0
6	Hibernians	28	8	6	14	40	51	−11	17		4–5	1–3 (Note: Valletta were assigned as home team for both Championship Round matches against Hibernians for unknown reasons; this match was the latter of these two and has been put in this table cell for organisatorical reasons.)	1–2	1–0	0–1	—

Source: maltafootball.com, Maltese FA
Rules for classification: 1) Points; 2) Play-offs (only if needed to decide champions, teams for relegation or teams for UEFA competitions).
Points earned in the first round have been halved.
(C) Champions

==== Europa league and Third Place play-off ====
Due to finishing equal on points, Qormi and Sliema played a play-off match to determine Maltese second UEFA Europa League participant for the 2010–11 season and finish third.

1 June 2010
19:30 CEST

Qormi	0–2	Sliema Wanderers
		Dronca 51' (pen.); 90+5' (o.g.)

Ta' Qali National Stadium, Ta' Qali

=== Play-Out ===
Pos	Team	Pld	W	D	L	GF	GA	GD	Pts	Relegation	FLO	HAM	DIN	MSJ
7	Floriana	24	10	6	8	35	41	−6	25		—	1–0	4–2	2–1
8	Ħamrun Spartans	24	10	4	10	41	39	+2	24		2–1	—	2–1	2–2
9	Dingli Swallows (R)	24	2	0	22	23	71	−48	5	Relegation to the 2010–11 Maltese First Division	0–3	0–6	—	5–2
10	Msida Saint-Joseph (Note: Msida Saint-Joseph were docked 10 points for failing to honour payments to their former coach and a number of former players.) (R)	24	4	4	16	24	51	−27	1	Relegation to the 2010–11 Maltese First Division	1–1	3–5	3–2	—

Source: maltafootball.com, maltafootball.com
Rules for classification: 1) Points; 2) Play-offs (only if needed to decide champions, teams for relegation or teams for UEFA competitions).
Points earned in the first round have been halved.
(R) Relegated

== Top scorers ==
Rank	Player	Club	Goals
1	(Brazil) Camilo	Qormi	24
2	(Malta) Terence Scerri	Valletta	20
3	(Malta) Ryan Darmanin	Floriana	17
4	(Netherlands) Sylvano Comvalius	Birkirkara	15
4	(Brazil) Denni	Tarxien Rainbows	15
4	(Brazil) Marcelo Pereira	Ħamrun Spartans	15
7	(Malta) Michael Galea	Birkirkara	14
8	(Nigeria) Josef Okonkwo	Dingli Swallows	13
8	(Malta) Jean Pierre Mifsud Triganza	Sliema Wanderers	13
10	(Malta) Trevor Cilia	Birkirkara	12
10	(Nigeria) Alfred Effiong	Qormi	12
Goals total			433
Matches total			132
Average per match			3.28
