= Jeffrey Chetcuti =

Maltese footballer

Personal information
- Full name: Jeffrey Chetcuti
- Date of birth: 22 April 1974 (age 52)
- Place of birth: Malta
- Position: Defender

Youth career
- Mosta

Senior career*
Years	Team	Apps	(Gls)
1992–1993	Luxol St. Andrews	18	(1)
1993–2002	Valletta	194	(7)
2002–2009	Sliema Wanderers	165	(2)
2009–2011	Vittoriosa Stars	20+	(0+)
2011–2012	Qormi	15	(0)
2012–2014	Gżira United		
2014–2015	Oratory Youths		
2025–2016	Santa Venera Lightnings		

International career^{‡}
1989-1990	Malta U16	8	(0)
1990-1991	Malta U18	9	(0)
1992-1995	Malta U21	24	(0)
1994–2005	Malta	68	(0)
2004	Malta XI	1	(0)
- * Club domestic league appearances and goals as of 17 May 2012 ‡ National team caps and goals as of 17 May 2012

Jeffrey Chetcuti (born 22 April 1974 in Malta) is a retired footballer, who represented the Malta national team. He plays as a defender.

== International career ==
Chetcuti made his debut for Malta in a March 1994 friendly match against Slovakia and earned a total of 69 caps, 1 unofficial (no goals). His final international was a February 2005 friendly against Norway.

== Honours ==
FC Valletta

- Maltese Premier League: 4

1997, 1998, 1999, 2001

- FA Trophy: 4

1995, 1996, 1997, 2001

Sliema Wanderers

- Maltese Premier League: 3

2003, 2004, 2005

- FA Trophy: 2

2004, 2009
