= Davina Barbara =

Gibraltarian journalist

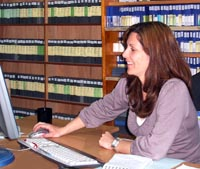
- Davina Barbara working in the GBC newsroom.
- Born: Gibraltar
- Occupation(s): Broadcast journalist, cultural development officer
- Years active: 2001 - present
- Employer: Gibraltar Cultural Services
- Spouse: Derek Barbara

Davina Barbara is a Gibraltarian cultural development officer and former broadcast journalist.

== Media career ==
Barbara joined the Gibraltar Broadcasting Corporation in 2001 as a broadcast journalist in the newsroom. She then moved to Radio Gibraltar where she co-produced the station's current affairs programmes.

== Gibraltar Cultural Services ==
In 2018, Barbara was appointed as a cultural development officer for Gibraltar Cultural Services, an agency of the Gibraltar Government. In this role she was acting press officer at the 2018 Gibraltar Literary Festival.

== Other activities ==
Barbara holds a degree in History of Art. She is also known for appearing in local plays and as a singer.
