= Etienne Barbara =

Maltese footballer

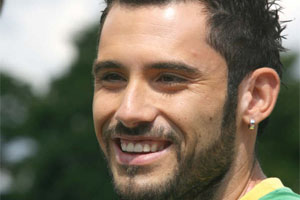

Personal information
- Full name: Etienne Barbara
- Date of birth: 10 June 1982 (age 44)
- Place of birth: Pietà, Malta
- Height: 6 ft 0 in (1.83 m)
- Position: Forward

Youth career
- Qormi

Senior career*
Years	Team	Apps	(Gls)
1999–2003	Floriana	74	(8)
2003–2005	Marsaxlokk	43	(21)
2005–2007	Birkirkara	59	(31)
2007–2008	Sliema Wanderers	23	(8)
2008–2009	SC Verl	18	(0)
2009–2010	Hibernians	19	(3)
2010–2011	Carolina RailHawks	54	(28)
2011	→ Sliema Wanderers (loan)	6	(2)
2012	Vancouver Whitecaps FC	2	(0)
2012	→ Vancouver Whitecaps FC U-23 (loan)	1	(0)
2013	Minnesota United	7	(2)
2013	Tampa Bay Rowdies	10	(1)

International career^{‡}
2004–2010	Malta	30	(3)

Managerial career
- 2018–: Heat FC
- * Club domestic league appearances and goals as of 14 December 2013 ‡ National team caps and goals as of 18 August 2009

Etienne Barbara (born 10 June 1982) is a Maltese former footballer and manager.

== Club career ==
=== Malta ===
Barbara started his career as a youth player with Qormi. After having been spotted by scouts following some impressive displays, he earned a move to play in the Maltese Premier League with Floriana in July 1999. Early in his career with them, he was often used in defensive positions and although he played 74 games with the club he only managed eight goals – all which were all scored during the 2001–02 season. In 2002, Barbara received his first call up to the Maltese national team due to a number of impressive performances for Floriana.

With Barbara in high demand he moved on from Floriana after four years of service, and joined ambitious newly promoted club Marsaxlokk on 25 January 2003. He scored 21 goals in 43 games. Following two successful years, and a series of impressive displays with Marsaxlokk, Barbara earned a move to join up with Birkirkara in January 2005. In two seasons, Barbara managed 31 goals in 59 appearances with Birkirkara, but was forced to leave the club in July 2007, when he was and teammate Roderick Briffa were deemed surplus to requirements, following a major reshuffle in the playing staff the club.

Barbara transferred from Birkirkara to Sliema Wanderers in July 2007, and signed a two-year deal, where he teamed up with former team mate Roderick Briffa who had joined earlier in the month. He remained with Malta’s most successful club for one season, making a total of 23 appearances and scoring eight goals, but indicated he would leave at the end of the 2007–08 season in order to pursue a career in Europe.

=== Germany ===
Barbara found his move to mainland Europe in the shape of German Regionalliga West (IV) side SC Verl, where he signed a two-year contract. He made his debut for Verl on 16 August 2008 in a league match against Bayer 04 Leverkusen II, being introduced in the second half as a 55th-minute substitute for Waldemar Jurez.

During the 2008–09 winter break, League of Ireland First Division winners Dundalk made a move to take Barbara to play for them in the League of Ireland Premier Division. It is believed that Barbara was interested in the move, but with the player still under contract with SC Verl, the move did not materialize.

Barbara played 1117 minutes for the SC Verl (not counting cup and preparation games), without scoring a single goal, and during the preparations for the 2009–10 season, he was dismissed with immediate effect for unexcused absence.

=== Back to Malta ===
Following his dismissal by Verl, Barbara was given a trial and took part in a pre-season tournament with English Football League Championship side Sheffield Wednesday, however he was not offered a contract.

On 20 August 2009, it was announced that Barbara had joined Maltese Premier League champions Hibernians. Barbara had hoped to win a contract elsewhere in Europe, but after weeks of speculation and deals not materialising, this put a host of Maltese Premier League on alert. The first to express a strong interest where Floriana, with new manager Roddy Collins reportedly offering Barbara the option of linking him with a club in the United Kingdom in January.

However Collins dropped his interest in Barbara on 20 August therefore he joined Hibernians, who were keen to sign him, likely to fill the void left by Terence Scerri, who joined Valletta. Barbara had an outstanding debut, scoring all three goals and winning the Man of the Match award in a 3–1 in over his former club Marsaxlokk. Later on the game was invalidated.

=== North America ===
Barbara joined United States USSF Division 2 club Carolina RailHawks on 25 February 2010. He scored two goals in his RailHawks debut on 10 April 2010, in a game against AC St. Louis. Barbara currently holds the record for most goals scored by a Carolina Railhawk in a single season for two consecutive years, scoring eight goals during the 2010 campaign, and breaking his own record with nine goals in the first seven matches of the 2011 campaign. Additionally, he is the clubs' all-time leading scorer. In August 2011, he was voted as offensive player of the month, just days after he scored a brilliant hat-trick. In October 2011, Etienne Barbara won the NASL Golden Ball, the award for the league’s most valuable player. Barbara received all nineteen first place votes cast by media from each NASL market. In his second season with the RailHawks, he scored 20 goals and had eight assists to win the NASL's Golden Boot. He was also named to the NASL Best XI.

Due to Barbara's great form, he had been heavily linked with a move to the MLS or another high level league. Due to a MLS discovery claim, the rights to sign Barbara in MLS belonged to Montreal Impact through the 2012 season meaning that the club would be the only team in MLS able to sign him unless Montreal trades his rights, according to the league's discovery process. In an interview on 10 January 2012 Barbara revealed that talks with Montreal had stalled because he did not feel Montreal's contract offer was fair and that the club was stalling in signing him. Of the situation, Barbara said, "I felt they were wasting time because they were signing other players but they were in no rush to sign me because they already own my rights. They just weren’t getting back to me. It was frustrating....Now we are in January and as far as I'm concerned we are just wasting time. Plus, I can't talk to any other team because they own me. The problem is in the rules. America has everything that any other country in any other sport should envy. You have facilities and everything in your favor and then you have rules like that. Montreal made me a bad offer. Look, I've scored 20 goals and had 9 assists and I won the best player of the league. And for what? For nothing in America. Because I'm stuck with Montreal and they don't want to pay good money. From what I understand, they are just holding my rights to try to get the best offer from somebody else. How can Montreal own my rights without even talking to me or paying me anything? If they don't want me they should just release me but obviously they want money for me. But who gives the right for that club to own me? That happens only in America. To own me without even talking to me or paying any money to me?"

On 17 January 2012, Montreal traded Barbara's MLS rights to Vancouver Whitecaps FC, then coached by former RailHawks coach Martin Rennie, in exchange for Gienir Garcia. He officially signed with Vancouver on 28 February 2012. His season was marred with injuries that kept him out action for a lot of the season. Eventually he was released by Vancouver on November after only two league appearances for the club.

On 23 January, Barbara was one of six high-profile signings announced by Minnesota United. He was traded to Tampa Bay Rowdies on 1 August 2013 in exchange for forward Mike Ambersley.

== International career ==
Barbara made his international debut for Malta during a UEFA Euro 2004 qualifying match away to Israel, which ended with an impressive 2–2 draw. He scored his first and second goals in the same match during the Malta International Tournament, when Malta defeated Estonia with a 5–2 scoreline.

Barbara scored the third of his international goals in a 2006 FIFA World Cup qualifying match against Bulgaria in a 1–1 draw, an equaliser to cancel out an earlier goal from Chavdar Yankov.

Barbara has played as a midfielder, a striker, and a winger during his times with the national team, and is great at creating goal scoring opportunities.

=== International goals ===
#	Date	Venue	Opponent	Score	Result	Competition
1.	16 February 2004	National Stadium, Ta' Qali, Malta	Estonia	1–0	5–2	Malta International Tournament
2.	16 February 2004	National Stadium, Ta' Qali, Malta	Estonia	4–2	5–2	Malta International Tournament
3.	12 October 2005	National Stadium, Ta' Qali, Malta	Bulgaria	1–1	1–1	2006 FIFA World Cup qualifying

== Honours ==
=== Individual ===
- NASL Golden Boot: 2011
- NASL MVP: 2011
