= Sylvano Comvalius =

Dutch footballer (born 1987)

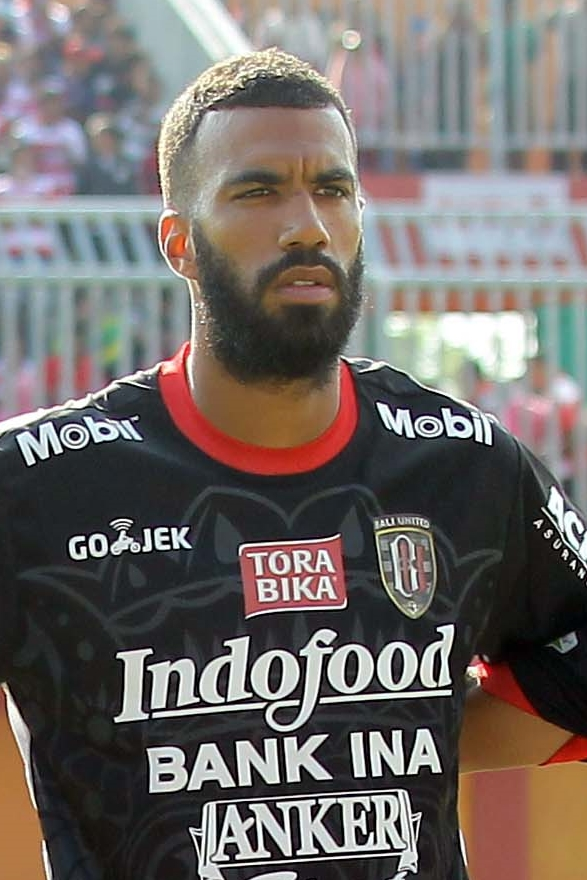
- Comvalius with Bali United in 2017

Personal information
- Full name: Sylvano Dominique Comvalius
- Date of birth: 10 August 1987 (age 39)
- Place of birth: Amsterdam, Netherlands
- Height: 1.92 m (6 ft 4 in)
- Position: Forward

Team information
- Current team: Jong AZ (assistant coach)

Youth career
- Diemen
- Ajax
- Omniworld
- AFC

Senior career*
Years	Team	Apps	(Gls)
2007–2008	Omniworld	2	(0)
2008	Quick Boys	8	(0)
2008–2009	Ħamrun Spartans	12	(9)
2009–2010	Birkirkara	28	(15)
2010	Stirling Albion	6	(0)
2011	Al-Salmiya	18	(8)
2011	Atyrau	15	(1)
2012	Fujian Smart Hero	27	(4)
2013–2014	Eintracht Trier	34	(13)
2014–2015	Dynamo Dresden	31	(6)
2015–2016	KSV Hessen Kassel	28	(8)
2016–2017	Stal Kamianske	17	(5)
2017	Bali United	34	(37)
2018	Suphanburi	7	(0)
2019	Kuala Lumpur City	5	(1)
2019–2020	Arema	27	(5)
2020	Persipura Jayapura	2	(0)
2020	Sliema Wanderers	10	(2)
2021	Geylang International	7	(2)
2021–2022	Quick Boys	10	(1)
Total		328	(117)

Managerial career
- 2023–2024: AZ U17 (assistant)
- 2024–2026: AZ U19 (assistant)
- 2026–: Jong AZ (assistant)
- * Club domestic league appearances and goals

Sylvano Dominique Comvalius (born 10 August 1987) is a Dutch professional football coach and former player who played as a forward. He is currently the assistant coach of Eerste Divisie club Jong AZ.

== Career ==
At Birkirkara, Comvalius became the club's top scorer and won the Maltese Premier League.

On 1 October 2010, he signed a short-term deal with Scottish First Division side Stirling Albion. In January 2011, he moved to Al-Salmiya SC in Kuwait. In June 2011, he joined Kazakh club FC Atyrau, where countryman Kiran Bechan already played.

He transferred to China League One club Fujian Smart Hero in March 2012. He then spent a year with Regionalliga Südwest side Eintracht Trier, and was transferred to Dynamo Dresden of the 3. Liga in 2014. He later played for Hessen Kassel and Ukrainian side Stal Kamianske.

In March 2017, he joined Bali United on a one-year contract, to team up with an old friend from Ajax, Irfan Bachdim. The 2017 season was a productive one for Comvalius as he plundered a record 37 goals in 34 games to help his team finish second.

After his impact in the Indonesian league and a short stint in Thailand, he moved to Malaysia in December 2018 to join Malaysia club KLFA but he decline his contract for 2019 season.

Comvalius signed for Singapore Premier League side, Geylang International, for the 2021 Singapore Premier League season; citing playing in Singapore as a part of his bucket list.

== Personal life ==
Comvalius is of Surinamese descent through his father.

== Career statistics ==
Appearances and goals by club, season and competition
Club	Season	League			National cup		League cup		Continental		Total	
Club	Season	Division	Apps	Goals	Apps	Goals	Apps	Goals	Apps	Goals	Apps	Goals
Ħamrun Spartans	2008–09	Maltese Premier League	12	9	0	0	0	0	0	0	22	14
Birkirkara	2009–10	Maltese Premier League	28	15	0	0	0	0	2	0	30	15
Stirling Albion	2010–11	Scottish Football League	6	0	1	0	0	0	0	0	7	0
Al-Salmiya	2011–12	Kuwaiti Premier League	18	8	0	0	0	0	0	0	18	8
Atyrau	2011	Kazakhstan Premier League	15	1	0	0	0	0	0	0	15	1
Fujian Smart Hero	2012	China League One	27	4	0	0	0	0	0	0	27	4
Eintracht Trier	2013–14	Regionalliga Südwest	34	13	1	0	0	0	0	0	35	13
Dynamo Dresden	2014–15	3. Liga	31	6	2	0	0	0	0	0	33	6
KSV Hessen Kassel	2015–16	Regionalliga Südwest	28	8	1	0	0	0	0	0	29	8
Stal Kamianske	2016–17	Ukrainian Premier League	17	5	0	0	0	0	0	0	17	5
Bali United	2017	Liga 1	34	37	0	0	0	0	0	0	34	37
Suphanburi	2018	Thai League 1	7	0	0	0	0	0	0	0	7	0
Kuala Lumpur	2019	Malaysia Super League	5	1	0	0	0	0	0	0	5	1
Arema	2019	Liga 1	27	5	0	0	0	0	0	0	27	5
Persipura Jayapura	2020	Liga 1	2	0	0	0	0	0	0	0	2	0
Sliema Wanderers	2020–21	Maltese Premier League	10	2	0	0	0	0	0	0	10	2
Geylang International	2021	Singapore Premier League	7	2	0	0	0	0	0	0	7	2
Quick Boys	2021–22	Tweede Divisie	10	1	0	0	0	0	0	0	10	1
Career total			318	117	6	0	0	0	2	0	333	121

== Honours ==
Birkirkara

- Maltese Premier League: 2009–10

Eintracht Trier

- Rhineland Cup: 2013–14

Individual

- Liga 1 Top Goalscorer: 2017
- Liga 1 Best XI: 2017
