= Kiril Mihaylov =

Bulgarian footballer

Personal information
- Full name: Kiril Dimitrov Mihaylov
- Date of birth: 13 February 1986 (age 40)
- Place of birth: Sofia, Bulgaria
- Height: 1.88 m (6 ft 2 in)
- Position: Forward

Team information
- Current team: Oborishte
- Number: 10

Youth career
- Levski Sofia

Senior career*
Years	Team	Apps	(Gls)
2004	Naftex Burgas	10	(1)
2005	Anchialo Pomorie	9	(4)
2005–2006	Pomorie	12	(1)
2006–2007	Minyor Bd	18	(3)
2007–2008	Rilski Sportist	25	(13)
2008	Olympiakos Nicosia	9	(2)
2009	Birkirkara	11	(4)
2009	Minyor Pernik	2	(0)
2010	Rilski Sportist	12	(6)
2010	Bansko	8	(1)
2011	Botev Vratsa	10	(6)
2012	Rilski Sportist	?	(?)
2013	Chepinets Velingrad	?	(8)
2014–	Oborishte	3	(1)
- * Club domestic league appearances and goals as of 1 July 2014

Kiril Mihaylov (Bulgarian: Кирил Михайлов; born 13 February 1986 in Sofia) is a Bulgarian footballer who currently plays for Oborishte as a forward.

== Career ==
Mihaylov was educated in Levski Sofia's youth academy, but made his professional debut with Naftex Burgas during the 2004–05 season. On 7 August 2004 he played his first match in the A PFG against Pirin Blagoevgrad. During the next three seasons Mihaylov played in the second division with Pomorie, Minyor Bobov dol and Rilski Sportist Samokov.

On 29 January 2009, Maltese Birkirkara F.C. announced Mihaylov will join the club. Five months later Kiril leave the Maltese club and signed with Minyor Pernik. Mihaylov mutually terminated his contract with Minyor Pernik at the end of 2009 and was rumoured to be joining Kazakhstani side Irtysh Pavlodar as a free agent.
