= Lucian Dronca =

Romanian footballer

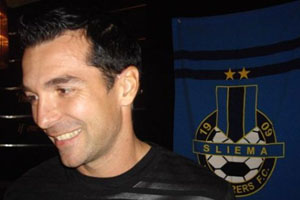

Personal information
- Full name: Lucian Florin Dronca
- Date of birth: 30 May 1973 (age 53)
- Place of birth: Arad, Romania
- Height: 5 ft 11 in (1.80 m)
- Positions: Defender; midfielder

Youth career
- Voința Zimandul Nou
- UTA Arad

Senior career*
Years	Team	Apps	(Gls)
1991–1996	UTA Arad	60	(1)
1996–1997	NK Osijek	9	(0)
1997–1998	NK Istra	15	(3)
1998–1999	HNK Segesta	7	(0)
2001–2005	Birkirkara	106	(24)
2005–2008	Woodlands Wellington	103	(10)
2008–2010	Sliema Wanderers	53	(10)
- * Club domestic league appearances and goals

Lucian Florin Dronca (born 30 May 1973) is a Romanian former professional footballer who played as a defender and midfielder.

During 1999–2001 he played for a short while in Hungary and two years in Germany in lower divisions.

Dronca played for Singaporean side Woodlands Wellington FC.
