= Lima (footballer, born 1986) =

Brazilian footballer

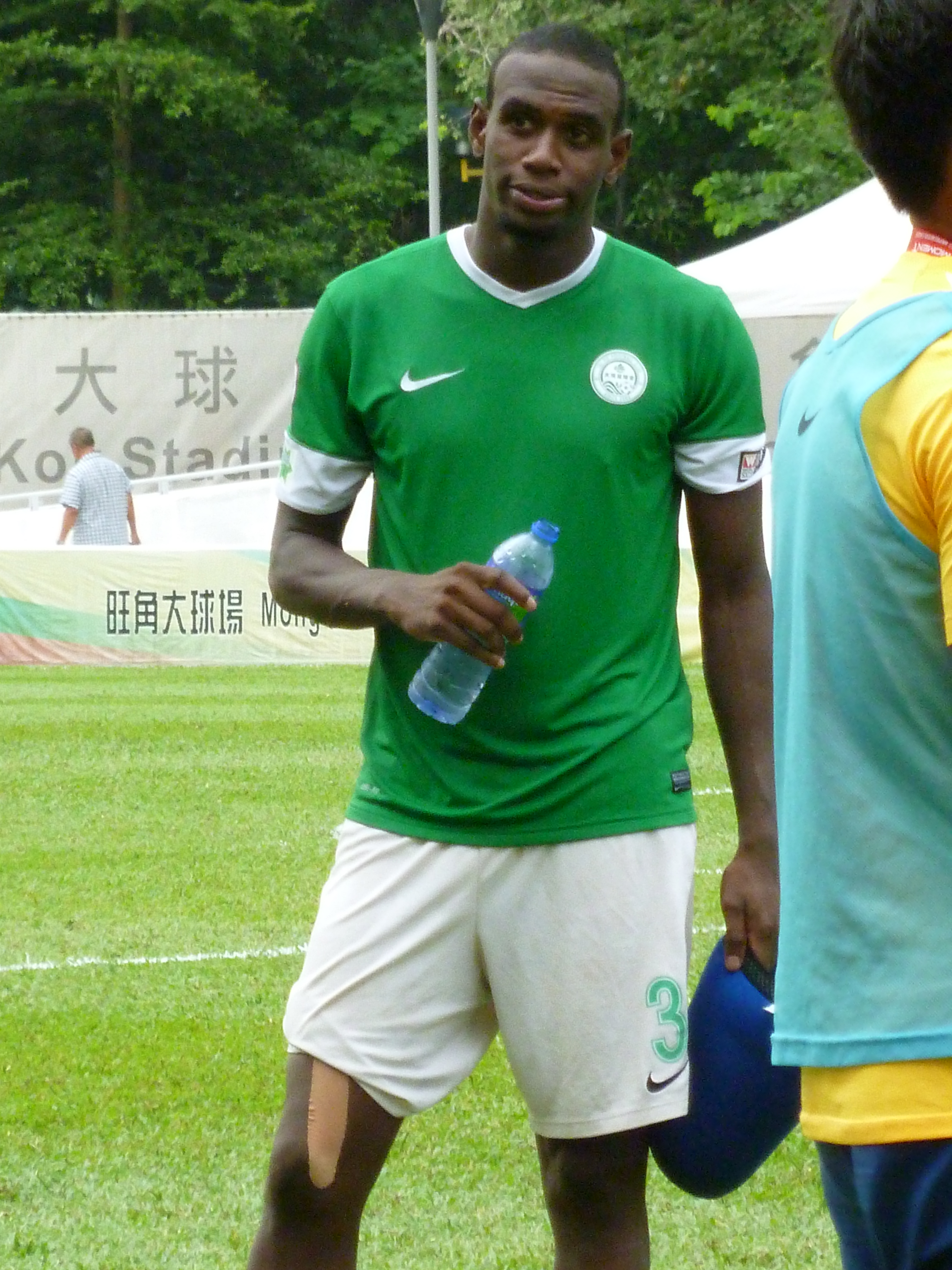
- Lima in 2016

Personal information
- Full name: Éverson Alan da Lima
- Date of birth: July 1, 1986 (age 40)
- Place of birth: Sorocaba, Brazil
- Height: 1.85 m (6 ft 1 in)
- Position: Centre-back

Youth career
- Juventus da Mooca

Senior career*
Years	Team	Apps	(Gls)
2002–2008	Juventus da Mooca	3	(0)
2008–2009	Tarxien Rainbows	10	(1)
2009–2010	Dynamo České Budějovice	3	(0)
2011	Monte Azul	13	(0)
2011	Icasa		
2011	Red Bull Brasil		
2012	Volta Redonda	4	(0)
2013–2014	Paulista	4	(0)
2014	Atlético Sorocaba	5	(1)
2014	Hoverla Uzhhorod	1	(0)
2015	Al-Akhaa Al-Ahli	13	(0)
2015	Comercial–SP	6	(0)
2015–2016	Dynamo České Budějovice	4	(0)
2016	Grêmio Osasco	6	(0)
2016–2017	Tai Po	16	(0)
2018–2019	Chattanooga FC	31	(3)
- * Club domestic league appearances and goals as of 22 June 2018

Éverson Alan da Lima (born July 1, 1986), also known as Lima, is a Brazilian former professional footballer who played as a centre-back.

== Career ==
Lima played for Juventus da Mooca, Tarxien Rainbows, Atlético Monte Azul, Dynamo České Budějovice, Red Bull Brasil, Icasa and Volta Redonda.

He also played professionally in the Campeonato Brasileiro Série A for Juventus da Mooca and in the Czech Gambrinus liga for Dynamo České Budějovice.
