= Paul Camilleri =

Maltese cyclist

Personal information
- Born: 6 January 1934 (age 92)

Cycling career
- Sport: Cycling

Paul Camilleri (born 6 January 1934) is a former Maltese cyclist. He competed in the individual road race and team time trial events at the 1960 Summer Olympics.
