= Mauro Di Lello =

Italian footballer

Personal information
- Full name: Mauro Di Lello
- Date of birth: 12 March 1978 (age 48)
- Place of birth: Rome, Italy
- Height: 6 ft 0 in (1.83 m)

Youth career
- 1989–1997: S.S. Lazio

Senior career*
Years	Team	Apps	(Gls)
1997–1999	S.S. Lazio	10	(0)
1998	→ A.C. Pistoiese (loan)		
1999	→ Fano Calcio (loan)		
1999–2000	Giorgione	18	(1)
2002–2004	Pietà Hotspurs	39	(1)
2004–2005	Nocerina		
2005–2007	Sliema Wanderers	36	(2)
2008–2009	Birkirkara	6	(0)
- * Club domestic league appearances and goals as of 14 February 2010

Mauro Di Lello (born 12 March 1978) is a former footballer who played as a defender. Currently he holds a consultant role within the Malta Football Association, following his stint playing for Sliema Wanderers and Birkirkara.
