= Kenneth Scicluna =

Maltese footballer

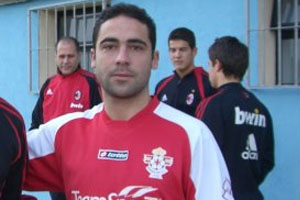

Personal information
- Full name: Kenneth Scicluna
- Date of birth: 15 June 1979 (age 47)
- Place of birth: Pietà, Malta
- Height: 5 ft 11 in (1.80 m)
- Position: Defender

Youth career
- Luqa St. Andrew's

Senior career*
Years	Team	Apps	(Gls)
1993–1994	Floriana		
1994–1997	Luqa St. Andrew's	36	(3)
1997–1999	St. Patrick	42	(1)
1999–2007	Birkirkara	130	(1)
2000–2001	→ Qormi (loan)	11	(1)
2007–2014	Valletta	78	(2)
2011–2012	→ Qormi (loan)	23	(0)
2012–2013	→ Marsaxlokk (loan)	22	(1)
2013–2014	→ Żebbuġ Rangers (loan)	21	(1)
2014–2015	→ Vittoriosa Stars (loan)	23	(0)

International career^{‡}
	Malta U21	25	(0)
2005–	Malta	27	(0)
- * Club domestic league appearances and goals as of 11 June 2011 ‡ National team caps and goals as of 24 January 2010

Kenneth Scicluna (born 15 June 1979 in Pietà, Malta) is a retired professional footballer who played as a defender.

== Playing career ==
Scicluna started his career in the Luqa Youth Nursery at the age of nine in 1988. He played in all age groups from 15 to 17 and also in Division three with the same club. In 1997, he moved to Zabbar St. Patricks. He remained with the Saints until season 1999, scoring one goal.. In season 1999–2000, Scicluna joined Maltese Premier League side Birkirkara, where he made 130 appearances and won the championship twice. In season 2006–07, he joined Qormi on a four-month loan. He then joined Valletta. Later in the season of 2011–12, he was linked to Mosta FC but joined Qormi FC on loan.

== International career ==
Scicluna has been capped 25 times for the Maltese Under-21 side. He made his debut with the national team in 2005 and so far has earned 27 caps.

== Honours ==
=== Birkirkara ===
- 1999–00, 2005–06 Maltese Premier League

=== Valletta ===
- 2007–08 Maltese Premier League
