= Clifford Gatt Baldacchino =

Maltese footballer

Personal information
- Date of birth: 9 February 1988 (age 38)
- Positions: Central defender; right back

Team information
- Current team: Gżira United
- Number: 13

Senior career*
Years	Team	Apps	(Gls)
2006–	Sliema Wanderers	120	(1)
2007–2008	→ Mqabba (loan)	23	(1)
2008–2009	→ Tarxien Rainbows (loan)	10	(0)
2009–2016	Sliema Wanderers	117	(2)
2016–	Gżira United		

International career^{‡}
2013–	Malta	4	(0)
- * Club domestic league appearances and goals as of 19:08, 12 January 2015 (UTC) ‡ National team caps and goals as of 19:08, 12 January 2015 (UTC)

Clifford Gatt Baldacchino (born 9 February 1988) known as ‘Il-Balda’ is a Maltese international footballer who plays for Gżira United, as a centre back and also as a right back

== Career ==
Gatt Baldacchino has played club football for Sliema Wanderers, Mqabba and Tarxien Rainbows. He has won the Euro Challenge Cup, the Super Cup and also the FA Trophy all with Sliema. He has played seven times in the Europa league all for Sliema.

He played for his country at under-19 (three official matches) and under-21 (nine official matches) levels. He made his senior international debut for Malta in 2013.
