= Paulo Massaro =

Brazilian footballer and manager

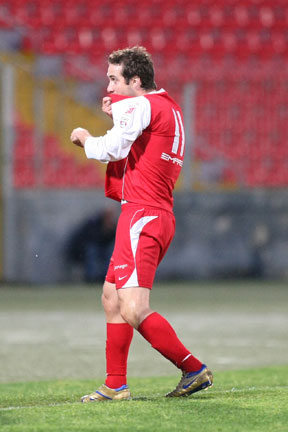
- Massaro in 2009

Personal information
- Date of birth: 29 December 1981 (age 44)
- Place of birth: Ribeirão Preto, Brazil
- Height: 1.84 m (6 ft 0 in)
- Position: Striker

Team information
- Current team: Sergipe (assistant)

Youth career
- 1995–2000: Botafogo-SP

Senior career*
Years	Team	Apps	(Gls)
2000	Botafogo-SP	0	(0)
2001–2002	Santa Ritense	22	(16)
2003–2004	Rio Claro	4	(3)
2004–2005	Bandeirante	22	(11)
2005	Nacional-AM	12	(7)
2006	Atlético Goianiense	12	(7)
2006	Jataiense	6	(3)
2007	Juventus-SP	12	(6)
2007	Tupi	10	(2)
2007	Ulbra RS	8	(2)
	Rio Branco-PR	14	(7)
2008	Paraná	8	(3)
2008	Santa Helena	10	(9)
2009	Valletta	15	(6)
2010	Uberlândia	3	(1)
2011	Anapolina	10	(2)
2012	Angra dos Reis		
2012	Botafogo-SP		
2013	Uberaba	1	(0)

Managerial career
- 2015–2016: CRAC (assistant)
- 2017: Sertãozinho (assistant)
- 2018: Prudentópolis (assistant)
- 2018: Prudentópolis
- 2019–2020: Santa Cruz U23
- 2021: Metropolitano
- 2021: Carlos Renaux
- 2022: Joinville
- 2022: Rio Branco-PR
- 2023: CRAC
- Confiança
- CRAC
- 2024-2025: Guarani
- 2025-2026: Operário-MS
- 2026-: Sergipe (assistant)
- * Club domestic league appearances and goals

Paulo Massaro (born 29 December 1981) is a Brazilian football coach and former player who played as a striker. He is the current assistant coach of Sergipe.

== Career ==
Born in Ribeirão Preto, Massaro previously played for Paraná Clube and Rio Branco Sport Club in the Copa do Brasil. His former manager, Saulo de Freitas, brought him from Rio Branco to Paraná.

Paulo joined Valletta F.C. during the winter break for the 2008–09 season.
