= 1998–99 Maltese Premier League =

Maltese Premier League
- Season: 1998–99
- Champions: Valletta (17th title)
- Relegated: Rabat Ajax; Ħamrun Spartans
- Champions League: Valletta
- UEFA Cup: Birkirkara; Sliema Wanderers
- UEFA Intertoto Cup: Floriana
- Matches played: 135
- Goals scored: 451 (3.34 per match)

The 1998–99 Maltese Premier League was the 19th season of the Maltese Premier League, and the 84th season of top-tier football in Malta. It was contested by 10 teams, and Valletta F.C. won the championship.

== Teams ==
Locations of the 1998–99 Maltese Premier League teams

== League table ==
Pos	Team	Pld	W	D	L	GF	GA	GD	Pts	Qualification or relegation
1	Valletta (C)	27	23	1	3	71	23	+48	70	Qualification for the 1999–2000 UEFA Champions League
2	Birkirkara	27	21	5	1	69	20	+49	68	Qualification for the 1999–2000 UEFA Cup
3	Sliema Wanderers	27	14	5	8	54	32	+22	47	Qualification for the 1999–2000 UEFA Cup
4	Hibernians	27	12	6	9	47	33	+14	42	
5	Floriana	27	10	6	11	47	50	−3	36	Qualification for the 1999 UEFA Intertoto Cup
6	Naxxar Lions	27	7	8	12	32	46	−14	29	
7	Pietà Hotspurs	27	7	6	14	39	39	0	27	
8	Rabat Ajax	27	7	6	14	37	67	−30	27	
9	Żabbar St. Patrick (R)	27	3	8	16	29	71	−42	17	Relegation to the 1999–2000 Maltese First Division
10	Ħamrun Spartans (R)	27	4	3	20	26	70	−44	15	Relegation to the 1999–2000 Maltese First Division

Source: RSSSF
(C) Champions; (R) Relegated

== Results ==
=== Matches 1–18 ===
Home \ Away	BKR	FRN	HIB	ĦMR	NXR	PTA	RBT	SLM	ZAB	VLT
Birkirkara	—	2–2	1–1	3–0	5–1	2–0	2–2	0–0	1–0	4–1
Floriana	0–4	—	0–2	2–0	2–1	2–1	5–1	1–1	5–1	0–4
Hibernians	0–3	3–2	—	5–0	0–0	1–1	2–1	0–0	3–1	1–3
Ħamrun Spartans	0–3	1–2	1–3	—	0–0	0–4	4–2	1–2	3–4	1–4
Naxxar Lions	2–1	0–0	1–1	1–1	—	1–1	1–2	2–0	2–2	0–3
Pietà Hotspurs	0–2	1–2	0–2	3–0	3–5	—	4–0	0–2	1–1	0–1
Rabat Ajax	3–5	1–1	2–0	4–2	0–3	2–1	—	2–4	1–1	1–7
Sliema Wanderers	2–3	1–0	3–1	3–0	1–2	4–2	2–0	—	7–0	1–3
Żabbar St. Patrick	2–3	2–2	0–6	3–0	1–3	0–0	1–1	0–5	—	3–4
Valletta	0–1	4–1	1–0	3–1	1–0	1–0	4–0	4–0	5–0	—

Legend: Blue = home team win; Yellow = draw; Red = away team win.

=== Matches 19–27 ===
Home \ Away	BKR	FRN	HIB	ĦMR	NXR	PTA	RBT	SLM	ZAB	VLT
Birkirkara	—	3–0	—	—	—	2–1	—	2–0	1–0	2–1
Floriana	—	—	—	—	—	2–4	0–4	1–1	5–0	1–3
Hibernians	1–1	2–3	—	2–1	—	1–0	—	—	—	—
Ħamrun Spartans	0–7	1–0	—	—	—	1–4	—	—	1–2	—
Naxxar Lions	0–1	2–6	2–1	1–2	—	—	—	—	—	—
Pietà Hotspurs	—	—	—	—	4–1	—	1–1	1–1	1–0	—
Rabat Ajax	1–5	—	1–6	2–1	2–0	—	—	—	—	0–0
Sliema Wanderers	—	—	2–1	1–2	3–0	—	3–0	—	—	2–3
Żabbar St. Patrick	—	—	1–2	—	1–1	—	2–1	1–3	—	—
Valletta	—	—	2–0	2–1	2–0	2–1	—	—	3–2	—

Legend: Blue = home team win; Yellow = draw; Red = away team win.
