= David Camilleri =

Maltese footballer

Personal information
- Full name: David Camilleri
- Date of birth: 21 August 1974 (age 52)
- Place of birth: Ħamrun, Malta
- Position: Midfielder

Team information
- Current team: Hamrun Spartans (on loan from Valletta)

Senior career*
| Years | Team | Apps | (Gls) |
| 1991–1999 | Hamrun Spartans | 137 | (8) |
| 1999–2003 | Sliema Wanderers | 83 | (13) |
| 2003–2005 | Marsaxlokk | 41 | (0) |
| 2005–2006 | Hibernians | 41 | (6) |
| 2006–2010 | Valletta | 65 | (3) |
| 2009–2010 | →Tarxien Rainbows (loan) | 36 | (1) |
| 2010–2013 | →Hamrun Spartans (loan) | 71 | (4) |

International career^{‡}
| 1996–2001 | Malta | 35 | (0) |
- * Club domestic league appearances and goals as of 1 August 2009 ‡ National team caps and goals as of 1 August 2009

David Camilleri (born 21 August 1974 in Ħamrun, Malta) is a professional footballer currently playing for Maltese Premier League side Hamrun Spartans on loan from fellow Maltese Premier League side Valletta. He plays as a midfielder.

== Honours ==
=== Marsaxlokk ===
Runner Up

- 2004 Maltese Cup

=== Valletta ===
Winner

- 2007/08 Maltese Premier League
