= Terence Scerri =

Maltese footballer

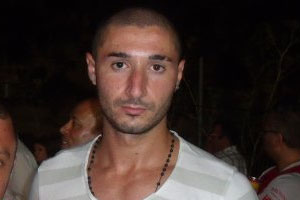

Personal information
- Full name: Terence Scerri
- Date of birth: 3 April 1984 (age 42)
- Place of birth: Senglea, Malta
- Height: 6 ft 0 in (1.83 m)
- Position: Striker

Team information
- Current team: Zurrieq F.C.

Youth career
- –2000: St. George's

Senior career*
Years	Team	Apps	(Gls)
2000–2009	Hibernians	164	(80)
2009–2020	Valletta	61	(37)
2012–2013	→ Ħamrun Spartans (loan)	7	(1)
2013–2014	→ Naxxar Lions (loan)	24	(8)
2014–2015	→ Senglea Athletic (loan)	11	(10)
2015–2016	→ Senglea Athletic (loan)	11	(4)
2016–2017	→ Kalkara United (loan)	2	(0)
2017–2018	→ Senglea Athletic (loan)	0	(0)
2018–2019	→ Żurrieq (loan)	15	(11)
2019–2020	→ Marsa (loan)	10	(4)

International career^{‡}
2006–2009	Malta	17	(1)
- * Club domestic league appearances and goals as of 3 November 2025 ‡ National team caps and goals as of 3 November 2025

Terence Scerri (born 3 April 1984 in Senglea, Malta) is a professional footballer currently playing for Zurrieq Football Club

== Playing career ==
=== Hibernians ===
Terence Scerri was spotted playing for the St. George's youth team, and was snapped up by Maltese Premier League team Hibernians. Scerri made his first team bow during the 2000–01 season, going on to make just two appearances, failing to score, as Hibernians recorded a 4th-place finish in the Premier League.

Scerri started to stake a claim for more first team action during the 2001–02 season. Terence made six appearances and scored two goals. He got his first taste of success as Hibernians won the Maltese title.

Despite the success of the previous season, Terence could not help Hibernians emulate the same achievement during the 2002–03 season. The club went on to finish the season in 4th position in the Maltese Premier League, however Terence began to be a permanent fixture in the first team, making 20 appearances, but failed to score a single goal.

Terence started to form an explosive strike partnership with Andrew Cohen during the 2003–04 season. Hibernians went on to finish one place better than the previous season, in 3rd position. Scerri made 21 appearances and scored eight goals during the season.

The 2004–05 season, saw the Scerri and Cohen strike partnership at their most devastating, between them netting 33 times. Hibernians went on to another 3rd-place finish in the Premier League, Scerri made 25 appearances and scored 12 goals.

Terence continued to show his impressive form into the 2005–06 season. Terence helped Hibernians secure a 4th-place finish in the Premier League, making 19 appearances and scored seven goals. Terence also helped the club win the Maltese Cup. Scerri's good form had not gone unnoticed as he also received his first cap for Maltese national team during the season.

Scerri went into the 2006–07 season, and added to his medals collection, as Hibernians secured the Maltese Cup for the second consecutive season. On the domestic front, Hibernians finished in 5th position in the Premier League, with Terence making 21 appearances and scoring 14 goals.

The 2007–08 season turned out to be a very disappointing one for Hibernians, as the club finished the first phase of the season in the relegation pool, there was never any doubt the club would avoid relegation, and finished the season in 7th position. Scerri went on to make 24 appearances and score 11 goals. The club did however have one thing to shout about, as they won the Maltese Super Cup.

Hibernians went from one extreme to the other during the 2008–09 season. Under the guidance of new manager Mark Miller, the club shocked the critics and beat Valletta by two points to win the Maltese title. Terence went make 26 appearances and scored 26 goals, making him the Premier League top scorer for the season.

=== Valletta ===
On 28 July 2009, it was announced that Valletta have signed Terence Scerri on a five-year contract for an undisclosed fee.

Terence Scerri was banned from going to a football ground in Malta and also from all football activities for a year, after he was charged with slightly injuring Floriana's Christian Cassar after kicking him in front of TV cameras. This was not his first football ban, his ban was later reduced to 8 games, even though he still cannot go near a football stadium in Malta.

On 23 February 2012 Terence Scerri was fined €1000, when Christian Cassar had withdrawn his criminal complaint against Scerri and forgiven him. Now he is able to return play with the current champions Valletta F.C.

== Honours ==
=== Club ===
Hibernians

- Maltese Premier League: 2001–02, 2008–09
- Maltese FA Trophy: 2006–07, 2007–08
- Maltese Super Cup: 2007–08

Valletta

- Maltese Premier League: 2010–11
- Maltese FA Trophy: 2009–10
- Maltese Super Cup: 2010
- 100th National Anniversary League: 2009–10

== International goals ==
Scores and results list Malta's goal tally first.

No	Date	Venue	Opponent	Score	Result	Competition
1.	17 October 2007	Ta' Qali National Stadium, Ta' Qali, Malta	Moldova	1–3	2–3	UEFA Euro 2008 qualifying
