= 2008–09 Maltese Premier League =

Maltese Premier League
- Season: 2008–09
- Dates: 23 August 2008 – 24 May 2009
- Champions: Hibernians (10th title)
- Relegated: Marsaxlokk
- Champions League: Hibernians
- Europa League: Valletta; Birkirkara
- Matches played: 132
- Goals scored: 387 (2.93 per match)
- Top goalscorer: (Malta) Terence Scerri (26)

The Maltese Premier League 2008–09 was the 94th season of the Maltese Premier League, the top-tier association football competition in Malta. It began on 23 August 2008 with a scoreless draw between Floriana and Hamrun Spartans; and ended on 24 May 2009. The first goal in the season was scored by Ivan, who played for Qormi. Hibernians were crowned champions on 23 May 2009, surpassing rivals Valletta by two points and winning their tenth title.

== Teams ==
Locations of the 2008–09 Maltese Premier League teams

The following teams were promoted from the First Division at the start of the season:

- Qormi
- Tarxien

From the previous Premier League season, the following teams were relegated to the First Division:

- Mqabba
- Pieta Hotspurs

== Competition modus ==
In the First phase, every team played each opponent twice, once home and once away, for a total of 18 games. The league was then split in two pools. Earned points were halved. Teams that finished in positions 1–6 compete in the "Top Six" and teams finishing in positions 7–10 play in the "Play-Out".

== First phase ==
=== League table ===
| Pos | Team | Pld | W | D | L | GF | GA | GD | Pts | Qualification or relegation |
|---|---|---|---|---|---|---|---|---|---|---|
| 1 | Hibernians | 18 | 13 | 2 | 3 | 49 | 19 | +30 | 41 | Qualification for the Top Six |
| 2 | Valletta | 18 | 11 | 7 | 0 | 31 | 11 | +20 | 40 | Qualification for the Top Six |
| 3 | Birkirkara | 18 | 9 | 5 | 4 | 31 | 28 | +3 | 32 | Qualification for the Top Six |
| 4 | Sliema Wanderers | 18 | 7 | 5 | 6 | 24 | 24 | 0 | 26 | Qualification for the Top Six |
| 5 | Floriana | 18 | 6 | 4 | 8 | 18 | 21 | −3 | 22 | Qualification for the Top Six |
| 6 | Marsaxlokk | 18 | 6 | 4 | 8 | 28 | 33 | −5 | 22 | Qualification for the Top Six |
| 7 | Msida Saint-Joseph | 18 | 6 | 3 | 9 | 20 | 28 | −8 | 21 | Qualification for the Play-Out |
| 8 | Hamrun Spartans | 18 | 5 | 2 | 11 | 24 | 37 | −13 | 17 | Qualification for the Play-Out |
| 9 | Qormi | 18 | 3 | 6 | 9 | 16 | 26 | −10 | 15 | Qualification for the Play-Out |
| 10 | Tarxien Rainbows | 18 | 4 | 2 | 12 | 22 | 36 | −14 | 14 | Qualification for the Play-Out |

Source: kicker.de (in German)
Rules for classification: 1) Points; 2) Play-offs (only if needed to decide champions, teams for relegation or teams for UEFA competitions).
Note: Teams ranked 1 through 6 qualified for the championship pool, teams ranked 7 through 10 play in the relegation pool. Earned points were halved and taken over to the respective pools.

=== Results ===
| Home \ Away | BIR | FLO | HIB | HAM | MRS | MSJ | QOR | SLI | TAR | VAL |
|---|---|---|---|---|---|---|---|---|---|---|
| Birkirkara | — | 0–1 | 0–6 | 3–2 | 2–3 | 2–0 | 1–1 | 4–2 | 1–0 | 2–2 |
| Floriana | 1–2 | — | 2–1 | 0–0 | 3–1 | 0–1 | 0–2 (Note: The match from 25 January 2009 was awarded to Qormi with a score of 2–0 because Floriana fielded an ineligible player.) | 0–0 | 3–1 | 0–1 |
| Hibernians | 3–2 | 1–1 | — | 1–0 | 4–1 | 5–1 | 3–0 | 2–3 | 2–0 | 1–1 |
| Hamrun Spartans | 0–1 | 0–1 | 1–4 | — | 4–3 | 1–0 | 3–2 | 0–2 | 0–4 | 1–3 |
| Marsaxlokk | 1–1 | 2–1 | 2–3 | 4–2 | — | 2–1 | 1–1 | 1–2 | 2–1 | 0–1 |
| Msida Saint-Joseph | 2–2 | 4–1 | 0–2 | 3–2 | 1–1 | — | 1–1 | 0–3 | 1–0 | 0–2 |
| Qormi | 0–1 | 0–0 | 1–3 | 1–4 | 1–3 | 0–1 | — | 1–2 | 1–0 | 0–2 |
| Sliema Wanderers | 2–3 | 0–3 | 0–1 | 0–3 | 0–0 | 2–1 | 1–1 | — | 4–2 | 1–1 |
| Tarxien Rainbows | 1–3 | 3–0 | 2–7 | 1–1 | 3–1 | 0–2 | 0–3 | 1–0 | — | 1–3 |
| Valletta | 1–1 | 2–1 | 2–0 | 4–0 | 2–0 | 2–1 | 0–0 | 0–0 | 2–2 | — |

Source: kicker.de (in German)
Legend: Blue = home team win; Yellow = draw; Red = away team win.

== Second phase ==
=== Top Six ===
| Pos | Team | Pld | W | D | L | GF | GA | GD | Pts | Qualification or relegation | HIB | VAL | BIR | SLI | MRS | FLO |
|---|---|---|---|---|---|---|---|---|---|---|---|---|---|---|---|---|
| 1 | Hibernians (C) | 28 | 19 | 5 | 4 | 73 | 25 | +48 | 42 | Qualification for the 2009–10 UEFA Champions League | — | 0–0 | 2–0 | 0–0 | 2–2 | 4–1 |
| 2 | Valletta | 28 | 17 | 9 | 2 | 50 | 18 | +32 | 40 | Qualification for the 2009–10 UEFA Europa League | 2–1 | — | 4–1 | 5–0 | 1–2 | 0–0 |
| 3 | Birkirkara | 28 | 12 | 7 | 9 | 43 | 45 | −2 | 27 | Qualification for the 2009–10 UEFA Europa League | 0–4 | 3–1 | — | 0–0 | 1–2 | 3–1 |
| 4 | Sliema Wanderers (Note: Sliema Wanderers won the 2008–09 Maltese FA Trophy and thereby qualified for the 2009–10 UEFA Europa League.) | 28 | 10 | 8 | 10 | 33 | 41 | −8 | 25 | Qualification for the 2009–10 UEFA Europa League | 0–5 | 0–3 | 1–0 | — | 1–3 | 3–0 |
| 5 | Marsaxlokk (R) | 28 | 10 | 6 | 12 | 46 | 52 | −6 | 25 | Relegation to the 2009–10 Maltese First Division (Note: Marsaxlokk were relegated to the 2009–10 Maltese First Division for the season due to their involvement in a bribery scandal.) | 1–4 | 0–1 | 2–2 | 0–3 | — | 5–2 |
| 6 | Floriana | 28 | 7 | 6 | 15 | 25 | 44 | −19 | 16 | | 0–2 | 0–2 | 0–2 | 1–1 | 2–1 | — |

Source: maltafootball.com: 1, 2
Rules for classification: 1) Points; 2) Play-offs (only if needed to decide champions, teams for relegation or teams for UEFA competitions).
Points earned in the first round have been halved.
(C) Champions; (R) Relegated

=== Play-Out ===
| Pos | Team | Pld | W | D | L | GF | GA | GD | Pts | QOR | TAR | MSJ | HAM |
|---|---|---|---|---|---|---|---|---|---|---|---|---|---|
| 7 | Qormi | 24 | 7 | 6 | 11 | 30 | 31 | −1 | 20 | — | 1–2 | 2–1 | 1–2 |
| 8 | Tarxien Rainbows | 24 | 6 | 5 | 13 | 32 | 44 | −12 | 16 (Note: Deciding game) | 0–3 | — | 0–0 | 5–1 |
| 9 | Msida Saint-Joseph (Note: While Msida Saint-Joseph and Hamrun Spartans were relegated, they were returned to the Premier League in the wake of corruption scandals involving Vittoriosa Stars and Marsaxlokk.) | 24 | 7 | 5 | 12 | 25 | 40 | −15 | 16 | 0–5 | 2–2 | — | 2–0 |
| 10 | Hamrun Spartans | 24 | 7 | 3 | 14 | 31 | 48 | −17 | 16 | 0–2 | 1–1 | 3–0 | — |

Source: maltafootball.com: 1, 2
Rules for classification: 1) Points; 2) Play-offs (only if needed to decide champions, teams for relegation or teams for UEFA competitions).
Points earned in the first round have been halved.

==== Deciding game ====
Because Tarxien Rainbows, Msida Saint-Joseph and Hamrun Spartans were tied on points after all matches played, their head-to head results in Play-Out were decisive. Hamrun Spartans had the fewest points in those matches and were therefore immediately relegated. However, Tarxien Rainbows and Msida Saint-Joseph were equal on points in their two matches and they played a decision game to determine the second relegated team. The match was played on 8 May 2009 at Hibernians Ground. However, in the wake of a corruption scandal, both Hamrun Spartans and Msida Saint-Joseph were returned to the Premier League.

| Team 1 | Score | Team 2 |
|---|---|---|
| Msida Saint-Joseph | 1–1 (aet, p. 4–5) | Tarxien Rainbows |

== Top goalscorers ==
| Rank | Player | Club | Goals |
|---|---|---|---|
| 1 | (Malta) Terence Scerri | Hibernians | 26 |
| 2 | (Brazil) Daniel Mariano Bueno | Tarxien Rainbows | 23 |
| 3 | (Argentina) Julio Alcorsé | Marsaxlokk | 17 |
| 4 | (Cameroon) Njongo Priso | Valletta | 15 |
| 5 | (Brazil) Pedro dos Santos Calçado | Msida Saint-Joseph | 13 |
| 6 | (Nigeria) Alfred Effiong | Qormi | 12 |
| 7 | (Brazil) Marcelo Pereira | Marsaxlokk | 11 |
| 8 | (Malta) Andrew Cohen | Hibernians | 9 |
| 8 | (Netherlands) Sylvano Comvalius | Hamrun Spartans | 9 |
| 8 | (Malta) Ivan Woods | Sliema Wanderers | 9 |
| Goals total | | | 387 |
| Matches total | | | 132 |
| Average per match | | | 2.93 |
