= Malta national football team results (2000–2019) =

- Win Draw Loss

This is a list of Malta national football team results from 2000 to the present day.

== 2000s ==
=== 2000 ===
20 January Friendly	Malta	2–0	Qatar	Ta' Qali, Malta
15:30 (UTC+1)	Carabott 39' (pen.); Busuttil 48'	Report		Stadium: Ta' Qali National Stadium; Attendance: 1,725; Referee: Férid Sehli (Tunisia)

6 February 2000 Rothmans Tournament	Malta	3–0	Azerbaijan	Ta' Qali, Malta
16:15 (UTC+1)	Buttigieg 31'; Agius 53', 90' (pen.)	Report		Stadium: Ta' Qali National Stadium; Attendance: 2,603; Referee: Bujar Pregia (Albania)

8 February 2000 Rothmans Tournament	Malta	1–1	Andorra	Ta' Qali, Malta
19:15 (UTC+1)	Mallia 15'	Report	Sonejee 2'	Stadium: Ta' Qali National Stadium; Attendance: 2,624; Referee: Bujar Pregia (Albania)

10 February 2000 Rothmans Tournament	Malta	0–1	Albania	Ta' Qali, Malta
16:15 (UTC+1)		Report	Sinani 54'	Stadium: Ta' Qali National Stadium; Attendance: 3,654; Referee: Xaqani Mammadov (Azerbaijan)

28 March Friendly	Malta	0–3	Northern Ireland	Ta' Qali, Malta
17:00 (UTC+2)		Report	Hughes 14' (pen.); Quinn 16'; Healy 41'	Stadium: Ta' Qali National Stadium; Attendance: 2,556; Referee: Massimo De Santis (Italy)

28 May Friendly	Malta	0–1	South Africa	Ta' Qali, Malta
16:00 (UTC+2)		Report	Mngomeni 89'	Stadium: Ta' Qali National Stadium; Attendance: 767; Referee: Steve Dunn (England)

3 June Friendly	Malta	1–2	England	Ta' Qali, Malta
16:00 (UTC+2)	Wright 28' (o.g.)	Report	Keown 22'; Heskey 75'	Stadium: Ta' Qali National Stadium; Attendance: 10,023; Referee: Stefano Braschi (Italy)

27 July Friendly	Iceland	5–0	Malta	Reykjavík, Iceland
20:00 (UTC+0)	Sverrisson 19'; Sigurðsson 36', 56', 77' (pen.); Helguson 41'	Report		Stadium: Laugardalsvöllur; Attendance: 2,390; Referee: Knud Erik Fisker (Denmark)

16 August Friendly	Moldova	1–0	Malta	Chişinău, Moldova
18:00 (UTC+3)	Rogaciov 45+1'	Report		Stadium: Stadionul Republican; Attendance: 7,000; Referee: Asim Xudiyev (Azerbaijan)

2 September 2002 FIFA World Cup qualification	Northern Ireland	1–0	Malta	Belfast, Northern Ireland
15:00 (UTC+1)	Gray 70'	Report		Stadium: Windsor Park; Attendance: 8,227; Referee: Taras Bezubyak (Russia)

7 October 2002 FIFA World Cup qualification	Bulgaria	3–0	Malta	Sofia, Bulgaria
18:30 (UTC+3)	Ivanov 40', 65'; Todorov 90'	Report		Stadium: Georgi Asparuhov Stadium; Attendance: 3,000; Referee: Džemal Čalija (Bosnia and Herzegovina)

11 October 2002 FIFA World Cup qualification	Malta	0–0	Czech Republic	Ta' Qali, Malta
18:00 (UTC+2)		Report		Stadium: Ta' Qali National Stadium; Attendance: 582; Referee: Željko Širić (Croatia)

15 November Friendly	Albania	3–0	Malta	Tirana, Albania
	Vata 45'; Bogdani 70', 90'	Report		Stadium: Qemal Stafa Stadium; Attendance: 2,000; Referee: Delče Jakimovski (Macedonia)

=== 2001 ===
28 February Friendly	Malta	0–3	Sweden	Ta' Qali, Malta
15:00 (UTC+1)		Report	Corneliusson 31'; Larsson 41'; Mild 78'	Stadium: Ta' Qali National Stadium; Attendance: 1,127; Referee: Cosimo Bolognino (Italy)

24 March 2002 FIFA World Cup qualification	Malta	0–5	Denmark	Ta' Qali, Malta
20:00 (UTC+1)		Report	Sand 8', 63', 79'; Heintze 51'; Jensen 76'	Stadium: Ta' Qali National Stadium; Attendance: 784; Referee: Mike McCurry (Scotland)

25 April 2002 FIFA World Cup qualification	Malta	1–4	Iceland	Ta' Qali, Malta
19:00 (UTC+2)	Mifsud 14'	Report	Guðmundsson 42'; Sigurdsson 44'; Guðjohnsen 81'; Guðjónsson 90'	Stadium: Ta' Qali National Stadium; Attendance: 2,800; Referee: Constantin Zotta (Romania)

2 June 2002 FIFA World Cup qualification	Iceland	3–0	Malta	Reykjavík, Iceland
16:00 (UTC+0)		Report	Guðmundsson 7'; Daðason 38'; Guðjohnsen 68'	Stadium: Laugardalsvöllur; Attendance: 3,554; Referee: Romāns Lajuks (Latvia)

6 June 2002 FIFA World Cup qualification	Denmark	2–1	Malta	Copenhagen, Denmark
19:15 (UTC+2)	Sand 43', 83'	Report	Mallia 8'	Stadium: Parken Stadium; Attendance: 38,499; Referee: Sergey Shmolik (Belarus)

15 August Friendly	Bosnia and Herzegovina	2–0	Malta	Sarajevo, Bosnia and Herzegovina
19:00 (UTC+2)	Baljić 17', 45'	Report		Stadium: Stadion Grbavica; Attendance: 4,000; Referee: Ábrahám Attila (Hungary)

1 September 2002 FIFA World Cup qualification	Malta	0–2	Bulgaria	Ta' Qali, Malta
20:00 (UTC+2)		Report	Berbatov 74', 80'	Stadium: Ta' Qali National Stadium; Attendance: 409; Referee: Hartmut Strampe (Germany)

5 September 2002 FIFA World Cup qualification	Czech Republic	3–2	Malta	Teplice, Czech Republic
17:00 (UTC+2)	Jankulovski 20'; Lokvenc 37'; Baroš 68'	Report	Carabott 22' (pen.); Agius 55'	Stadium: Na Stínadlech; Attendance: 9,218; Referee: Khagani Mamedov (Azerbaijan)

6 October 2002 FIFA World Cup qualification	Malta	0–1	Northern Ireland	Ta' Qali, Malta
18:30 (UTC+2)		Report	Healy 57' (pen.)	Stadium: Ta' Qali National Stadium; Attendance: 1,778; Referee: Manfred Schüttengruber (Austria)

14 November Friendly	Malta	2–1	Canada	Paola, Malta
14:45 (UTC+1)	Carabott 34' (pen.); Mifsud 75'	Report	Stalteri 43'	Stadium: Hibernians Stadium; Attendance: 1,292; Referee: Massimo De Santis (Italy)

=== 2002 ===
9 February 2002 Rothmans Tournament	Malta	2–1	Jordan	Ta' Qali, Malta
17:00 (UTC+1)	Mifsud 7'; Brincat 62'	Report	Abu Zema 58' (pen.)	Stadium: Ta' Qali National Stadium; Attendance: 784; Referee: Vladimir Antonov (Moldova)

11 February 2002 Rothmans Tournament	Malta	1–1	Lithuania	Ta' Qali, Malta
18:00 (UTC+1)	Agius 51'	Report	Dedura 33'	Stadium: Ta' Qali National Stadium; Attendance: 1,390; Referee: Ismail Al Hafi (Jordan)

13 February 2002 Rothmans Tournament	Malta	3–0	Moldova	Ta' Qali, Malta
18:00 (UTC+1)	Mallia 35', 54'; Mifsud 90'	Report		Stadium: Ta' Qali National Stadium; Attendance: 1,481; Referee: Darius Mieželis (Lithuania)

27 March Friendly	Malta	1–1	Andorra	Ta' Qali, Malta
19:00 (UTC+1)	Theuma 87'	Report	Lima 78'	Stadium: Ta' Qali National Stadium; Attendance: 483; Referee: Stefano Podeschi (San Marino)

17 April Friendly	Malta	1–0	Azerbaijan	Ta' Qali, Malta
18:45 (UTC+2)	Mifsud 56'	Report		Stadium: Ta' Qali National Stadium; Attendance: 413; Referee: Roberto Rosetti (Italy)

21 August Friendly	Macedonia	1–0	Malta	Skopje, Macedonia
20:00 (UTC+2)	Stojkov 36'; Šakiri 39', 63'; Hristov 56'; Pandev 89'	Report		Stadium: Gradski stadion Attendance: 4,000; Referee: Alojzije Šupraha (Croatia)

7 September UEFA Euro 2004 qualifying	Slovenia	3–0	Malta	Ljubljana, Slovenia
20:15 (UTC+2)	Debono 37' (o.g.); Šiljak 59'; Cimirotič 90'	Report		Stadium: Bežigrad Stadium; Attendance: 7,800; Referee: Georgios Borovilos (Greece)

12 October UEFA Euro 2004 qualifying	Malta	0–2	Israel	Ta' Qali, Malta
19:00 (UTC+2)		Report	Balili 56'; Revivo 76'	Stadium: Ta' Qali National Stadium; Attendance: 3,163; Referee: Sergei Shebek (Ukraine)

16 October UEFA Euro 2004 qualifying	Malta	0–4	France	Ta' Qali, Malta
20:45 (UTC+2)		Report	Henry 25', 35'; Wiltord 59'; Carrière 84'	Stadium: Ta' Qali National Stadium; Attendance: 9,748; Referee: Alexandru Tudor (Romania)

20 November UEFA Euro 2004 qualifying	Cyprus	2–1	Malta	Nicosia, Cyprus
19:00 (UTC+2)	Rauffmann 50'; Okkas 74'	Report	Mifsud 90'	Stadium: GSP Stadium; Attendance: 5,000; Referee: Anton Guenov (Bulgaria)

=== 2003 ===
12 February Friendly	Malta	2–2	Kazakhstan	Ta' Qali, Malta
18:15 (UTC+1)	Bogdanović 15'; Nwoko 61'	Report	Shevchenko 72'; Tarasov 82'	Stadium: Ta' Qali National Stadium; Attendance: 200; Referee: René Rogalla (Switzerland)

29 March UEFA Euro 2004 qualifying	France	6–0	Malta	Lens, France
20:45 (UTC+1)	Wiltord 36'; Henry 38', 54'; Zidane 57' (pen.), 80'; Trezeguet 70'	Report		Stadium: Stade Félix-Bollaert; Attendance: 40,775; Referee: Emil Bozinovski (Macedonia)

30 April UEFA Euro 2004 qualifying	Malta	1–3	Slovenia	Ta' Qali, Malta
20:30 (UTC+2)	Mifsud 90'	Report	Zahovič 15'; Šiljak 36', 57'	Stadium: Ta' Qali National Stadium; Attendance: 2,368; Referee: Attila Hanacsek (Hungary)

7 June UEFA Euro 2004 qualifying	Malta	1–2	Cyprus	Ta' Qali, Malta
19:00 (UTC+2)	Dimech 73'	Report	Konstantinou 23' (pen.), 62'	Stadium: Ta' Qali National Stadium; Attendance: 1,607; Referee: Bernhard Brugger (Austria)

19 August Friendly	Luxembourg	1–1	Malta	Esch-sur-Alzette, Luxembourg
20:00 (UTC+2)	Strasser 53' (pen.)	Report	Giglio 54'	Stadium: Stade de la Frontière; Attendance: 2,000; Referee: Gerald Lehner (Austria)

10 September UEFA Euro 2004 qualifying	Israel	2–2	Malta	Antalya, Turkey (Note: Israel were forced to play all home games away from Israel due to the ongoing violence regarding the Israeli–Palestinian conflict.)
18:00 (UTC+3)	Revivo 16'; Balili 79'	Report	Mifsud 51' (pen.); Carabott 52'	Stadium: Atatürk Stadium; Attendance: 250; Referee: Eric Blareau (Belgium)

11 December Friendly	Malta	0–4	Poland	Ta' Qali, Malta
17:00 (UTC+1)		Report	Bieniuk 54'; Mila 56'; Sikora 83'; Burkhardt 88'	Stadium: Ta' Qali National Stadium; Attendance: 100; Referee: Giorgos Kasnaferis (Greece)

=== 2004 ===
14 February 2004 Malta International Tournament	Malta	0–0	Moldova	Ta' Qali, Malta
16:15 (UTC+1)		Report		Stadium: Ta' Qali National Stadium; Attendance: 1,000; Referee: Valery Vyalichka (Belarus)

16 February 2004 Malta International Tournament	Malta	5–2	Estonia	Ta' Qali, Malta
16:15 (UTC+1)	Barbara 12', 60'; Said 28'; Turner 58'; Zahra 87'	Report	Zahovaiko 16'; Piiroja 45+2'	Stadium: Ta' Qali National Stadium; Attendance: 500; Referee: Ghenadie Orlic (Moldova)

18 February 2004 Malta International Tournament	Malta	0–4	Belarus U-23	Ta' Qali, Malta
16:00 (UTC+2)		Report	Kornilenko 11'; Tsyhalka 29'; Byahanski 70'; Lashankow 85'	Stadium: Ta' Qali National Stadium; Attendance: 4,000; Referee: Sten Kaldma (Estonia)

31 March Friendly	Malta	1–2	Finland	Ta' Qali, Malta
16:00 (UTC+2)	Mifsud 90+2'	Report	Eremenko 51'; Litmanen 86'	Stadium: Ta' Qali National Stadium; Attendance: 1,100; Referee: Matteo Trefoloni (Italy)

27 May Friendly	Germany	7–0	Malta	Freiburg, Germany
20:30 (UTC+2)	Ballack 15', 17', 59', 86'; Nowotny 33'; Frings 42'; Bobic 90'	Report		Stadium: Dreisamstadion; Attendance: 22,000; Referee: Anton Stredák (Slovakia)

18 August Friendly	Faroe Islands	3–2	Malta	Toftir, Faroe Islands
19:00 (UTC+1)	á Borg 31'; Jacobsen 42'; Benjaminsen 79'	Report	Giglio 51'; Mifsud 66'	Stadium: Svangaskarð; Attendance: 1,932; Referee: Emil Laursen (Denmark)

4 September 2006 FIFA World Cup qualification	Malta	0–7	Sweden	Ta' Qali, Malta
20:45 (UTC+2)		Report	Ibrahimović 4', 11', 14', 71'; Ljungberg 46', 74'; Larsson 76'	Stadium: Ta' Qali National Stadium; Attendance: 4,200; Referee: Haim Jakov (Israel)

9 October 2006 FIFA World Cup qualification	Malta	0–0	Iceland	Ta' Qali, Malta
18:15 (UTC+2)		Report		Stadium: Ta' Qali National Stadium; Attendance: 1,130; Referee: Sorin Corpodean (Romania)

13 October 2006 FIFA World Cup qualification	Bulgaria	4–1	Malta	Sofia, Bulgaria
18:00 (UTC+3)	Berbatov 43', 55'; Yanev 47'; Yankov 88'	Report	Mifsud 11'	Stadium: Vasil Levski National Stadium; Attendance: 16,800; Referee: Ceri Richards (Wales)

17 November 2006 FIFA World Cup qualification	Malta	0–2	Hungary	Ta' Qali, Malta
19:30 (UTC+1)		Report	Gera 39'; Kovács 93'	Stadium: Ta' Qali National Stadium; Attendance: 14,500; Referee: Tony Asumaa (Finland)

=== 2005 ===
9 February Friendly	Malta	0–3	Norway	Ta' Qali, Malta
19:00 (UTC+1)		Report	Rushfeldt 71', 80'; Riise 82'	Stadium: Ta' Qali National Stadium; Attendance: 1,000; Referee: David Malcolm (Northern Ireland)

30 March 2006 FIFA World Cup qualification	Croatia	3–0	Malta	Zagreb, Croatia
18:00 (UTC+2)	Pršo 22', 35'; Tudor 79'	Report		Stadium: Maksimir Stadium; Attendance: 15,510; Referee: Costas Kapitanis (Cyprus)

4 June 2006 FIFA World Cup qualification	Sweden	6–0	Malta	Gothenburg, Sweden
17:15 (UTC+2)	Jonson 6'; Svensson 18'; Wilhelmsson 29'; Ibrahimović 40'; Ljungberg 57'; Elmander 81'	Report		Stadium: Ullevi; Attendance: 35,593; Referee: Nikolai Ivanov (Russia)

8 June 2006 FIFA World Cup qualification	Iceland	4–1	Malta	Reykjavík, Iceland
18:05 (UTC+0)	Þorvaldsson 27'; Guðjohnsen 33'; Guðmundsson 74'; V. Gunnarsson 84'	Report	Said 58'	Stadium: Laugardalsvöllur; Attendance: 4,887; Referee: Damir Skomina (Slovenia)

17 August Friendly	Malta	1–1	Northern Ireland	Ta' Qali, Malta
20:00 (UTC+2)	Woods 36'	Report	Healy 9'	Stadium: Ta' Qali National Stadium; Attendance: 1,850; Referee: Mike Riley (England)

3 September 2006 FIFA World Cup qualification	Hungary	4–0	Malta	Budapest, Hungary
20:45 (UTC+2)	Torghelle 34'; Said 55' (o.g.); Takács 64'; Rajczi 85'	Report		Stadium: Stadium Puskás Ferenc; Attendance: 5,900; Referee: Vitaliy Hodulian (Ukraine)

7 September 2006 FIFA World Cup qualification	Malta	1–1	Croatia	Ta' Qali, Malta
18:45 (UTC+2)	Wellman 74'	Report	Kranjčar 19'	Stadium: Ta' Qali National Stadium; Attendance: 916; Referee: Athanassios Briakos (Greece)

12 October 2006 FIFA World Cup qualification	Malta	1–1	Bulgaria	Ta' Qali, Malta
19:00 (UTC+2)	Zahra 79'	Report	Yankov 67'	Stadium: Ta' Qali National Stadium; Attendance: 2,844; Referee: Vitaliy Godulyan (Ukraine)

=== 2006 ===
25 February 2006 Malta International Tournament	Malta	0–2	Moldova U-21	Ta' Qali, Malta
15:00 (UTC+1)		Report	Namașco 46'; Bugaiov 73'	Stadium: Ta' Qali National Stadium; Attendance: 1,225; Referee: Lasha Silagava (Georgia)

1 March 2006 Malta International Tournament	Malta	0–2	Georgia	Ta' Qali, Malta
19:15 (UTC+1)		Report	Martsvaladze 8'; Kankava 18'	Stadium: Ta' Qali National Stadium; Attendance: 1,100; Referee: Viaceslav Banari (Moldova)

4 June Friendly	Japan	1–0	Malta	Düsseldorf, Germany
15:00 (UTC+2)	Tamada 2'	Report		Stadium: LTU Arena; Attendance: 10,802; Referee: Knut Kircher (Germany)

15 August Friendly	Slovakia	3–0	Malta	Bratislava, Slovakia
20:15 (UTC+2)	Šebo 31', 75', 90'	Report		Stadium: Tehelné pole Attendance: 2,437; Referee: Romāns Lajuks (Latvia)

2 September UEFA Euro 2008 qualifying	Malta	2–5	Bosnia and Herzegovina	Ta' Qali, Malta
18:15 (UTC+2)	Pace 6'; M. Mifsud 86'	Report	Barbarez 4'; Hrgović 10'; Bartolović 45+1'; Muslimović 49'; Misimović 51'	Stadium: Ta' Qali National Stadium; Attendance: 2,000; Referee: Thomas Vejlgaard (Denmark)

6 September UEFA Euro 2008 qualifying	Turkey	2–0	Malta	Frankfurt, Germany
20:00 (UTC+2)	Nihat 56'; Tümer 77'	Report		Stadium: Commerzbank-Arena (Note: Turkey were ordered to play their first three home matches at a neutral ground and behind closed doors after violence in their World Cup qualifying play-off with Switzerland on 16 November 2005. Davies, Christopher (8 February 2006). "Turkey must play behind closed doors after fight". The Daily Telegraph.); Attendance: 0 Referee: Bernardino González Vázquez (Spain)

11 October UEFA Euro 2008 qualifying	Malta	2–1	Hungary	Ta' Qali, Malta
19:15 (UTC+2)	Schembri 14', 53'	Report	Torghelle 19'	Stadium: Ta' Qali National Stadium; Attendance: 3,600; Referee: Johny Ver Eecke (Belgium)

15 November Friendly	Malta	1–4	Lithuania	Paola, Malta
14:00 (UTC+1)	Agius 86'	Report	Danilevičius 37', 67'; Radzinevičius 58'; Kavaliauskas 90'	Stadium: Hibernians Stadium; Attendance: 1,500; Referee: Brian Lawlor (Wales)

=== 2007 ===
7 February Friendly	Malta	1–1	Austria	Ta' Qali, Malta
18:00 (UTC+1)	Agius 8'	Report	Ivanschitz 49'	Stadium: Ta' Qali National Stadium; Attendance: 3,000; Referee: Carlo Bertolini (Switzerland)

24 March UEFA Euro 2008 qualifying	Moldova	1–1	Malta	Chişinău, Moldova
19:00 (UTC+2)	Epureanu 85'	Report	Mallia 73'	Stadium: Zimbru Stadium; Attendance: 8,033; Referee: Vusal Aliyev (Azerbaijan)

28 March UEFA Euro 2008 qualifying	Malta	0–1	Greece	Ta' Qali, Malta
19:30 (UTC+2)		Report	Basinas 66' (pen.)	Stadium: Ta' Qali National Stadium; Attendance: 8,700; Referee: Pedro Proença (Portugal)

2 June UEFA Euro 2008 qualifying	Norway	4–0	Malta	Oslo, Norway
20:05 (UTC+2)	Hæstad 31'; Helstad 73'; Iversen 79'; Riise 90+1'	Report		Stadium: Ullevaal Stadion; Attendance: 16,364; Referee: Jacek Granat (Poland)

6 June UEFA Euro 2008 qualifying	Bosnia and Herzegovina	1–0	Malta	Sarajevo, Bosnia and Herzegovina
20:15 (UTC+2)	Muslimović 6'	Report		Stadium: Asim Ferhatović Hase; Attendance: 10,500; Referee: Ceri Richards (Wales)

22 August Friendly	Albania	3–0	Malta	Tirana, Albania
20:00 (UTC+2)	Salihi 33'; Berisha 46'; Duro 62'	Report		Stadium: Qemal Stafa Stadium; Attendance: 3,000; Referee: İsmet Arzuman (Turkey)

8 September UEFA Euro 2008 qualifying	Malta	2–2	Turkey	Ta' Qali, Malta
19:30 (UTC+2)	Said 41'; Schembri 76'	Report	Halil Altıntop 45'; Servet 78'	Stadium: Ta' Qali National Stadium; Attendance: 10,500; Referee: Stefan Messner (Austria)

12 September Friendly	Malta	0–1	Armenia	Ta' Qali, Malta
20:15 (UTC+2)		Report	Voskanyan 26'	Stadium: Ta' Qali National Stadium; Attendance: 200; Referee: Charles Richmond (Scotland)

13 October UEFA Euro 2008 qualifying	Hungary	2–0	Malta	Budapest, Hungary
16:20 (UTC+2)	Feczesin 34'; Tőzsér 77'	Report		Stadium: Szusza Ferenc Stadium; Attendance: 7,633; Referee: Karen Nalbandyan (Armenia)

17 October UEFA Euro 2008 qualifying	Malta	2–3	Moldova	Ta' Qali, Malta
19:30 (UTC+2)	Scerri 71'; Mifsud 84' (pen.)	Report	Bugaev 24' (pen.); Frunză 31', 35'	Stadium: Ta' Qali National Stadium; Attendance: 7,069; Referee: Igorj Ishchenko (Ukraine)

17 November UEFA Euro 2008 qualifying	Greece	5–0	Malta	Athens, Greece
21:30 (UTC+2)	Gekas 32', 72', 74'; Basinas 54'; Amanatidis 61'	Report		Stadium: Olympic Stadium; Attendance: 31,332; Referee: Sten Kaldama (Estonia)

21 November UEFA Euro 2008 qualifying	Malta	1–4	Norway	Ta' Qali, Malta
20:00 (UTC+1)	Mifsud 53'	Report	Iversen 25', 27' (pen.), 45'; Pedersen 75'	Stadium: Ta' Qali National Stadium; Attendance: 6,000; Referee: Yuri Baskakov (Russia)

=== 2008 ===
2 February 2008 Malta International Tournament	Malta	0–1	Armenia	Ta' Qali, Malta
16:15 (UTC+1)		Report	Hakobyan 75'	Stadium: Ta' Qali National Stadium; Attendance: 1,000; Referee: Magnús Þórisson (Iceland)

4 February 2008 Malta International Tournament	Malta	1–0	Iceland	Ta' Qali, Malta
19:45 (UTC+1)	Frendo 18'	Report		Stadium: Ta' Qali National Stadium; Attendance: 2,000; Referee: Aleksei Kulbakov (Belarus)

6 February 2008 Malta International Tournament	Malta	0–1	Belarus	Ta' Qali, Malta
19:45 (UTC+1)		Report	Romaschenko 89'	Stadium: Ta' Qali National Stadium; Attendance: 1,000; Referee: Ararat Chagharyan (Armenia)

26 March Friendly	Malta	7–1	Liechtenstein	Ta' Qali, Malta
19:00 (UTC+1)	Mifsud 2' (pen.), 17', 21' (pen.), 59', 69'; Pace 35'; Said 86'	Report	Burgmeier 51'	Stadium: Ta' Qali National Stadium; Attendance: 1,600; Referee: Willie Collum (Scotland)

30 May Friendly	Austria	5–1	Malta	Graz, Austria
20:30 (UTC+2)	Aufhauser 8'; Linz 11', 67' (pen.); Vastić 77'; Harnik 90+2'	Report	Mifsud 41'	Stadium: UPC-Arena; Attendance: 14,200; Referee: Robert Krajnc (Slovenia)

20 August Friendly	Estonia	2–1	Malta	Tallinn, Estonia
18:00 (UTC+2)	Purje 2'; Oper 53'	Report	Azzopardi 8'	Stadium: A. Le Coq Arena; Attendance: 2,700; Referee: Grzegorz Gilewski (Poland)

6 September 2010 FIFA World Cup qualification	Malta	0–4	Portugal	Ta' Qali, Malta
20:00 (UTC+2)		Report	Said 26' (o.g.); Almeida 61'; Simão 72'; Nani 78'	Stadium: Ta' Qali National Stadium; Attendance: 11,000; Referee: Kevin Blom (Netherlands)

10 September 2010 FIFA World Cup qualification	Albania	3–0	Malta	Tirana, Albania
19:45 (UTC+2)	Bogdani 45+1'; Duro 84'; Dallku 90'	Report		Stadium: Qemal Stafa Stadium; Attendance: 7,400; Referee: Robert Schoergenhofer (Austria)

11 October 2010 FIFA World Cup qualification	Denmark	3–0	Malta	Copenhagen, Denmark
20:00 (UTC+2)	Larsen 10', 46'; Agger 29' (pen.)	Report		Stadium: Parken Stadium; Attendance: 33,124; Referee: Levan Paniashvili (Georgia)

15 October 2010 FIFA World Cup qualification	Malta	0–1	Hungary	Ta' Qali, Malta
19:30 (UTC+2)		Report	Torghelle 23'	Stadium: Ta' Qali National Stadium; Attendance: 4,797; Referee: Johannes Valgeirsson (Iceland)

19 November Friendly	Malta	0–1	Iceland	Paola, Malta
14:30 (UTC+1)		Report	Helguson 66'	Stadium: Hibernians Stadium; Attendance: 500; Referee: Andrea De Marco (Italy)

=== 2009 ===
11 February 2010 FIFA World Cup qualification	Malta	0–0	Albania	Ta' Qali, Malta
19:30 (UTC+2)		Report		Stadium: Ta' Qali National Stadium; Attendance: 2,041; Referee: Alexandru Deaconu (Romania)

28 March 2010 FIFA World Cup qualification	Malta	0–3	Denmark	Ta' Qali, Malta
20:00 (UTC+1)		Report	Larsen 12', 23'; Nordstrand 89'	Stadium: Ta' Qali National Stadium; Attendance: 6,235; Referee: Tomasz Mikulski (Poland)

1 April 2010 FIFA World Cup qualification	Hungary	3–0	Malta	Budapest, Hungary
19:00 (UTC+2)	Hajnal 7'; Gera 81'; Juhász 90+3'	Report		Stadium: Ferenc Puskás Stadium; Attendance: 34,400; Referee: Stanislav Sukhina (Russia)

5 June Friendly	Czech Republic	1–0	Malta	Jablonec nad Nisou, Czech Republic
17:20 (UTC+2)	Necid 78'	Report		Stadium: Chance Arena; Attendance: 6,019; Referee: Fredy Fautrel (France)

10 June 2010 FIFA World Cup qualification	Sweden	4–0	Malta	Gothenburg, Sweden
19:00 (UTC+2)	Källström 22'; Majstorović 52'; Ibrahimović 56'; Berg 58'	Report		Stadium: Ullevi; Attendance: 25,271; Referee: Calum Murray (Scotland)

12 August Friendly	Malta	2–0	Georgia	Ta' Qali, Malta
20:00 (UTC+2)	Mifsud 64', 73'	Report		Stadium: Ta' Qali National Stadium; Attendance: 15,000; Referee: Panikos Kailis (Cyprus)

4 September Friendly	Malta	0–2	Cape Verde	Ta' Qali, Malta
20:30 (UTC+2)		Report	Héldon 15' (pen.); Nhambu 40'	Stadium: Ta' Qali National Stadium; Attendance: 1,000; Referee: Luca Banti (Italy)

9 September 2010 FIFA World Cup qualification	Malta	0–1	Sweden	Ta' Qali, Malta
18:30 (UTC+2)		Report	Azzopardi 82' (o.g.)	Stadium: Ta' Qali National Stadium; Attendance: 4,705; Referee: Adrian McCourt (Northern Ireland)

10 October Friendly	Angola	2–1	Malta	Vila Real de Santo António, Portugal
20:30 (UTC+1)	Campos 37'; Macanga 64'	Report	Cohen 12'	Stadium: Estádio Municipal de Vila Real de Santo António; Attendance: 150; Referee: Nuno Almeida (Portugal)

14 October 2010 FIFA World Cup qualification	Portugal	4–0	Malta	Guimarães, Portugal
19:45 (UTC+1)	Nani 14'; Simão 45'; Veloso 52'; Edinho 90'	Report		Stadium: Estádio D. Afonso Henriques; Attendance: 29,350; Referee: Alan Kelly (Republic of Ireland)

18 November Friendly	Malta	1–4	Bulgaria	Paola, Malta
19:00 (UTC+1)	Mifsud 48'	Report	Bojinov 5'; Berbatov 75', 82'; Georgiev 80'	Stadium: Hibernians Stadium; Attendance: 2,000; Referee: Bas Nijhuis (Netherlands)

== 2010s ==
=== 2010 ===
3 March Friendly	Malta	1–2	Finland	Ta' Qali, Malta
19:00 (UTC+1)	Mifsud 17'	Report	Eremenko 66'; Väyrynen 70'	Stadium: Ta' Qali National Stadium; Attendance: 1,050; Referee: Mauro Bergonzi (Italy)

13 May Friendly	Germany	3–0	Malta	Aachen, Germany
18:00 (UTC+2)	Cacau 16', 58'; Scicluna 61' (o.g.)	Report		Stadium: Tivoli; Attendance: 26,000; Referee: Alain Hamer (Luxembourg)

11 August Friendly	Malta	1–1	Macedonia	Ta' Qali, Malta
20:00 (UTC+2)	Mifsud 47'	Report	Tričkovski 37'	Stadium: Ta' Qali National Stadium; Attendance: 2,500; Referee: Gabriele Rossi (San Marino)

2 September UEFA Euro 2012 qualifying	Israel	3–1	Malta	Ramat Gan, Israel
21:15 (UTC+3)	Benayoun 7', 64' (pen.), 75'	Report	Pace 38'	Stadium: Ramat Gan Stadium; Attendance: 17,365; Referee: Saïd Ennjimi (France)

7 September UEFA Euro 2012 qualifying	Malta	0–2	Latvia	Ta' Qali, Malta
19:30 (UTC+2)		Report	Gorkšs 43'; Verpakovskis 85'	Stadium: Ta' Qali National Stadium; Attendance: 6,255; Referee: Tony Asumaa (Finland)

8 October UEFA Euro 2012 qualifying	Georgia	1–0	Malta	Tbilisi, Georgia
21:00 (UTC+4)	Siradze 90+1'	Report		Stadium: Boris Paichadze Stadium; Attendance: 38,000; Referee: Alan Black (Northern Ireland)

17 November UEFA Euro 2012 qualifying	Croatia	3–0	Malta	Zagreb, Croatia
17:30 (UTC+1)	Kranjčar 19', 42'; Kalinić 81'	Report		Stadium: Stadion Maksimir; Attendance: 9,000; Referee: Duarte Gomes (Portugal)

=== 2011 ===
9 February Friendly	Malta	0–0	Switzerland	Ta' Qali, Malta
20:30 (UTC+1)		Report		Stadium: Ta' Qali National Stadium; Attendance: 3,000; Referee: Marios Stamatis (Cyprus)

26 March UEFA Euro 2012 qualifying	Malta	0–1	Greece	Ta' Qali, Malta
20:30 (UTC+1)		Report	Torosidis 90+4'	Stadium: Ta' Qali National Stadium; Attendance: 10,605; Referee: Michael Weiner (Germany)

4 June UEFA Euro 2012 qualifying	Greece	3–1	Malta	Piraeus, Greece
21:30 (UTC+3)	Fetfatzidis 8', 64'; Papadopoulos 26'	Report	Mifsud 54'	Stadium: Karaiskakis Stadium; Attendance: 14,746; Referee: Pawel Gil (Poland)

10 August Friendly	Malta	2–1	Central African Republic	Ta' Qali, Malta
20:30 (UTC+2)	Mifsud 2' (pen.), 43'	Report	Momi 25'	Stadium: Ta' Qali National Stadium; Attendance: 0 Referee: Tolga Özkalfa (Turkey)

2 September UEFA Euro 2012 qualifying	Malta	1–3	Croatia	Ta' Qali, Malta
19:00 (UTC+2)	Mifsud 38'	Report	Vukojević 11'; Badelj 32'; Lovren 68'	Stadium: Ta' Qali National Stadium; Attendance: 6,150; Referee: Tony Chapron (France)

6 September UEFA Euro 2012 qualifying	Malta	1–1	Georgia	Ta' Qali, Malta
20:30 (UTC+2)	Mifsud 25'	Report	Kankava 15'	Stadium: Ta' Qali National Stadium; Attendance: 5,000; Referee: Pol van Boekel (Netherlands)

7 October UEFA Euro 2012 qualifying	Latvia	2–0	Malta	Riga, Latvia
20:00 (UTC+3)	Višņakovs 33'; Rudņevs 83'	Report		Stadium: Skonto Stadium; Attendance: 4,315; Referee: Richard Trutz (Slovakia)

11 October UEFA Euro 2012 qualifying	Malta	0–2	Israel	Ta' Qali, Malta
19:00 (UTC+2)		Report	Refaelov 11'; Gershon 90+3'	Stadium: Ta' Qali National Stadium; Attendance: 2,614; Referee: Bruno Paixão (Portugal)

=== 2012 ===
29 February Friendly	Malta	2–1	Liechtenstein	Ta' Qali, Malta
19:30 (UTC+2)	Mifsud 54', 63'	Report	Büchel 48'	Stadium: Ta' Qali National Stadium; Attendance: 2,300; Referee: Mark Whitby (Wales)

2 June Friendly	Luxembourg	0–2	Malta	Luxembourg City, Luxembourg
17:00 (UTC+2)		Report	Mifsud 10', 80'	Stadium: Stade Josy Barthel; Attendance: 1,054; Referee: Markus Hameter (Austria)

14 August Friendly	San Marino	2–3	Malta	Serravalle, San Marino
20:30 (UTC+2)	Marani 7'; Rinaldi 90+3' (pen.)	Report	Mifsud 13', 85'; Agius 22'	Stadium: Stadio Olimpico; Referee: Paolo Tagliavento (Italy)

7 September 2014 FIFA World Cup qualification	Malta	0–1	Armenia	Ta' Qali, Malta
20:00 (UTC+2)		Report	Sarkisov 70'	Stadium: Ta' Qali National Stadium; Attendance: 3,517; Referee: Rene Eisner (Austria)

11 September 2014 FIFA World Cup qualification	Italy	2–0	Malta	Modena, Italy
20:45 (UTC+2)		Report	Destro 5'; Peluso 90+2'	Stadium: Stadio Alberto Braglia; Attendance: 18,000; Referee: Antti Munukka (Finland)

12 October 2014 FIFA World Cup qualification	Czech Republic	3–1	Malta	Plzeň, Czech Republic
18:00 (UTC+2)	Gebre Selassie 34'; Pekhart 52'; Rezek 67'	Report	Briffa 38'	Stadium: Stadion města Plzně; Attendance: 10,358; Referee: Anar Salmanov (Azerbaijan)

14 November Friendly	Liechtenstein	0–1	Malta	Vaduz, Liechtenstein
19:00 (UTC+1)		Report	Caruana 38'	Stadium: Rheinpark Stadion; Attendance: 550; Referee: Nikolaj Hänni (Switzerland)

=== 2013 ===
6 February Friendly	Malta	0–0	Northern Ireland	Ta' Qali, Malta
19:30 (UTC+1)		Report		Stadium: Ta' Qali National Stadium; Attendance: 1,000; Referee: Nikolay Yordanov (Bulgaria)

22 March 2014 FIFA World Cup qualification	Bulgaria	6–0	Malta	Sofia, Bulgaria
18:00 (UTC+2)	Tonev 6', 38', 68'; I. Popov 47'; Gargorov 55'; Ivanov 78'	Report		Stadium: Vasil Levski National Stadium; Attendance: 0 (Note: Bulgaria v Malta was played without spectators due to sanctions imposed by FIFA as a result of racist chanting by Bulgarian supporters at the home match against Denmark. "Hungary and Bulgaria sanctioned to play without spectators". FIFA. 8 January 2013. Archived from the original on June 23, 2015.); Referee: Eitan Shemeulevitch (Israel)

26 March 2014 FIFA World Cup qualification	Malta	0–2	Italy	Ta' Qali, Malta
20:45 (UTC+1)		Report	Balotelli 8' (pen.), 45'	Stadium: Ta' Qali National Stadium; Attendance: 17,011; Referee: Serdar Gözübüyük (Netherlands)

7 June 2014 FIFA World Cup qualification	Armenia	0–1	Malta	Yerevan, Armenia
20:00 (UTC+4)		Report	Mifsud 8'	Stadium: Republican Stadium; Attendance: 8,500; Referee: Arnold Hunter (Northern Ireland)

14 August Friendly	Azerbaijan	3–0	Malta	Baku, Azerbaijan
21:00 (UTC+5)	Dadashov 5', 71'; Aliyev 63'	Report		Stadium: Eighth Kilometer District Stadium; Referee: Aleksandr Aliyev (Kazakhstan)

6 September 2014 FIFA World Cup qualification	Malta	1–2	Denmark	Ta' Qali, Malta
20:00 (UTC+2)	Failla 38'	Report	Andreasen 2'; Camilleri 52' (o.g.)	Stadium: Ta' Qali National Stadium; Attendance: 5,576; Referee: Anastasios Sidiropoulos (Greece)

10 September 2014 FIFA World Cup qualification	Malta	1–2	Bulgaria	Ta' Qali, Malta
20:00 (UTC+2)	Herrera 77'	Report	Dimitrov 9'; Gargorov 59'	Stadium: Ta' Qali National Stadium; Attendance: 4,884; Referee: Alexandru Tudor (Romania)

11 October 2014 FIFA World Cup qualification	Malta	1–4	Czech Republic	Ta' Qali, Malta
19:30 (UTC+2)	Mifsud 47'	Report	Hübschman 3'; Lafata 33'; Kadlec 51'; Pekhart 90'	Stadium: Ta' Qali National Stadium; Attendance: 4,530; Referee: Matej Jug (Slovenia)

15 October 2014 FIFA World Cup qualification	Denmark	6–0	Malta	Copenhagen, Denmark
20:15 (UTC+2)	Rasmussen 8', 74'; Agger 11' (pen.), 39' (pen.); Bjelland 28'; Nielsen 84'	Report		Stadium: Parken Stadium; Attendance: 11,479; Referee: Aleksandar Stavrev (Macedonia)

19 November Friendly	Malta	3–2	Faroe Islands	Ta' Qali, Malta
19:00 (UTC+1)	Fenech 17'; Mifsud 20'; Caruana 41'	Report	Hansson 80'; Baldvinsson 87'	Stadium: Ta' Qali National Stadium; Attendance: 1,050; Referee: Marcin Borski (Poland)

=== 2014 ===
5 March Friendly	Albania	2–0	Malta	Durrës, Albania
18:00 (UTC+1)	Basha 26'; Meha 52'	Report		Stadium: Niko Dovana Stadium; Attendance: 8,000; Referee: Dejan Jakimovski (Macedonia)

4 June Friendly	Gibraltar	1–0	Malta	Loulé, Portugal
18:00 (UTC+1)	Casciaro 64'	Report		Stadium: Estádio Algarve; Attendance: 500; Referee: João Capela (Portugal)

4 September Friendly	Slovakia	1–0	Malta	Loulé, Portugal
17:20 (UTC+1)	Nemec 64'	Report		Stadium: Estádio Algarve; Attendance: 3,509; Referee: João Capela (Portugal)

9 September UEFA Euro 2016 qualifying	Croatia	2–0	Malta	Zagreb, Croatia
20:45 (UTC+2)	Modrić 46'; Kramarić 81'	Report		Stadium: Stadion Maksimir; Attendance: 8,333; Referee: Vladislav Bezborodov (Russia)

10 October UEFA Euro 2016 qualifying	Malta	0–3	Norway	Ta' Qali, Malta
20:45 (UTC+2)		Report	Dæhli 22'; King 26', 49'	Stadium: Ta' Qali National Stadium; Attendance: 8,067; Referee: Antony Gautier (France)

13 October UEFA Euro 2016 qualifying	Malta	0–1	Italy	Ta' Qali, Malta
20:45 (UTC+2)		Report	Pellè 24'	Stadium: Ta' Qali National Stadium; Attendance: 16,942; Referee: Ovidiu Hațegan (Romania)

16 November UEFA Euro 2016 qualifying	Bulgaria	1–1	Malta	Sofia, Bulgaria
21:45 (UTC+2)	Galabinov 6'	Report	Failla 49' (pen.)	Stadium: Vasil Levski National Stadium; Attendance: 3,300; Referee: Martin Strömbergsson (Sweden)

=== 2015 ===
25 March Friendly	Georgia	2–0	Malta	Tbilisi, Georgia
20:00 (UTC+4)	Kankava 83'; Qazaishvili 90+1'	Report		Stadium: Mikheil Meskhi Stadium; Attendance: 16,000; Referee: Aleksandrs Anufrijevs (Latvia)

28 March UEFA Euro 2016 qualifying	Azerbaijan	2–0	Malta	Baku, Azerbaijan
21:00 (UTC+4)	Huseynov 4'; Nazarov 90+2'	Report		Stadium: Tofiq Bahramov Republican Stadium; Attendance: 14,600; Referee: Halis Özkahya (Turkey)

8 June Friendly	Malta	2–0	Lithuania	Ta' Qali, Malta
20:00 (UTC+2)	Fenech 62'; Effiong 79'	Report		Stadium: Ta' Qali National Stadium; Attendance: 950; Referee: Sven Bindels (Luxembourg)

12 June UEFA Euro 2016 qualifying	Malta	0–1	Bulgaria	Ta' Qali, Malta
20:45 (UTC+2)		Report	I. Popov 56'	Stadium: Ta' Qali National Stadium; Attendance: 3,924; Referee: Aleksandar Stavrev (Macedonia)

3 September UEFA Euro 2016 qualifying	Italy	1–0	Malta	Florence, Italy
20:45 (UTC+2)	Pellè 69'	Report		Stadium: Stadio Artemio Franchi; Attendance: 12,551; Referee: Ivan Kružliak (Slovakia)

6 September UEFA Euro 2016 qualifying	Malta	2–2	Azerbaijan	Ta' Qali, Malta
18:00 (UTC+2)	Mifsud 55'; Effiong 71'	Report	Amirguliyev 36', 80'	Stadium: Ta' Qali National Stadium; Attendance: 5,266; Referee: Harald Lechner (Austria)

10 October UEFA Euro 2016 qualifying	Norway	2–0	Malta	Oslo, Norway
18:00 (UTC+2)	Tettey 19'; Søderlund 52'	Report		Stadium: Ullevaal Stadion; Attendance: 27,120; Referee: Arnold Hunter (Northern Ireland)

13 October UEFA Euro 2016 qualifying	Malta	0–1	Croatia	Ta' Qali, Malta
20:45 (UTC+2)		Report	Perišić 25'	Stadium: Ta' Qali National Stadium; Attendance: 5,835; Referee: Mark Clattenburg (England)

11 November Friendly	Jordan	2–0	Malta	Istanbul, Turkey
17:00 (UTC+2)	Al-Dardour 25'; Al-Bakhit 90'	Report		Stadium: Maltepe Hasan Polat Stadium; Attendance: 20; Referee: Barış Şimşek (Turkey)

=== 2016 ===
24 March Friendly	Malta	0–0	Moldova	Ta' Qali, Malta
15:00 (UTC+2)		Report		Stadium: Ta' Qali National Stadium; Attendance: 500; Referee: Roomer Tarajev (Estonia)

27 May Friendly	Czech Republic	6–0	Malta	Kufstein, Austria
18:00 (UTC+2)	Plašil 15'; Škoda 21'; Hubník 40'; Lafata 74'; Necid 81'; Schick 90+1'	Report		Stadium: Kufstein Arena; Attendance: 1,000; Referee: Dominik Ouschan (Austria)

31 May Friendly	Austria	2–1	Malta	Klagenfurt, Austria
20:30 (UTC+2)	Arnautović 4'; Schöpf 18'	Report	Alaba 87' (o.g.)	Stadium: Wörthersee Stadion; Attendance: 20,200; Referee: Mattias Gestranius (Finland)

31 August Friendly	Estonia	1–1	Malta	Pärnu, Estonia
18:30 (UTC+3)	Zenjov 57'	Report	Effiong 59'	Stadium: Pärnu Rannastaadion; Attendance: 2,515; Referee: Michael Tykgaard (Denmark)

4 September 2018 FIFA World Cup qualification	Malta	1–5	Scotland	Ta' Qali, Malta
20:45 (UTC+2)	Effiong 14'	Report	Snodgrass 10', 61' (pen.), 84'; C. Martin 53'; S. Fletcher 78'	Stadium: Ta' Qali National Stadium; Attendance: 15,069; Referee: Yevhen Aranovsky (Ukraine)

8 October 2018 FIFA World Cup qualification	England	2–0	Malta	London, England
17:00 (UTC+1)	Sturridge 29'; Alli 38'	Report		Stadium: Wembley Stadium; Attendance: 81,781; Referee: Stefan Johannesson (Sweden)

11 October 2018 FIFA World Cup qualification	Lithuania	2–0	Malta	Vilnius, Lithuania
20:45 (UTC+2)	Černych 76'; Novikovas 84' (pen.)	Report		Stadium: LFF Stadium; Attendance: 5,067; Referee: Jesús Gil Manzano (Spain)

11 November 2018 FIFA World Cup qualification	Malta	0–1	Slovenia	Ta' Qali, Malta
20:45 (UTC+2)		Report	Verbič 47'	Stadium: Ta' Qali National Stadium; Attendance: 4,207; Referee: Paweł Raczkowski (Poland)

15 November Friendly	Malta	0–2	Iceland	Ta' Qali, Malta
19:00 (UTC+1)		Report	Traustason 47'; Ingason 75'	Stadium: Ta' Qali National Stadium; Attendance: 986; Referee: Arnold Hunter (Northern Ireland)

=== 2017 ===
26 March 2018 FIFA World Cup qualification	Malta	1–3	Slovakia	Ta' Qali, Malta
20:45 (UTC+2)	Farrugia 14'	Report	Weiss 2'; Greguš 41'; Nemec 84'	Stadium: Ta' Qali National Stadium; Attendance: 4,980; Referee: Ali Palabıyık (Turkey)

6 June Friendly	Malta	1–0	Ukraine	Graz, Austria
19:00 (UTC+2)	Muscat 14'	Report		Stadium: Merkur-Arena; Attendance: 500; Referee: Alexander Harkam (Austria)

10 June 2018 FIFA World Cup qualification	Slovenia	2–0	Malta	Ljubljana, Slovenia
18:00 (UTC+2)	Iličić 45+2'; Novaković 84'	Report		Stadium: Stožice Stadium; Attendance: 7,839; Referee: Simon Lee Evans (Wales)

1 September 2018 FIFA World Cup qualification	Malta	0–4	England	Ta' Qali, Malta
20:45 (UTC+2)	Kane 53', 90+2'; Bertrand 86'; Welbeck 90+1'	Report		Stadium: Ta' Qali National Stadium; Attendance: 16,994; Referee: Artur Soares Dias (Portugal)

4 September 2018 FIFA World Cup qualification	Scotland	2–0	Malta	Glasgow, Scotland
19:45 (UTC+1)	Berra 9'; Griffiths 49'	Report		Stadium: Hampden Park; Attendance: 26,371; Referee: Jakob Kehlet (Denmark)

5 October 2018 FIFA World Cup qualification	Malta	1–1	Lithuania	Ta' Qali, Malta
20:45 (UTC+2)	Agius 23'	Report	Slivka 53'	Stadium: Ta' Qali National Stadium; Attendance: 3,431; Referee: Zaven Hovhannisyan (Armenia)

8 October 2018 FIFA World Cup qualification	Slovakia	3–0	Malta	Trnava, Slovakia
18:00 (UTC+2)	Nemec 33', 62'; Duda 69'	Report		Stadium: Štadión Antona Malatinského; Attendance: 17,774; Referee: Paolo Mazzoleni (Italy)

12 November Friendly	Malta	0–3	Estonia	Ta' Qali, Malta
15:00 (UTC+1)		Report	Sappinen 1'; Mošnikov 14' (pen.); Anier 89'	Stadium: Ta' Qali National Stadium; Attendance: 2,796; Referee: Genc Nuza (Kosovo)

=== 2018 ===
22 March Friendly	Malta	0–1	Luxembourg	Ta' Qali, Malta
18:00 (UTC+2)		Report	da Mota 90+1'	Stadium: Ta' Qali National Stadium; Attendance: 1,000; Referee: Enea Jorgji (Albania)

26 March Friendly	Finland	5–0	Malta	Belek, Turkey
18:00 (UTC+3)	Pukki 13', 27'; Taimi 23'; Jensen 85'; Soiri 88'	Report		Stadium: Gloria Sports Arena; Attendance: 200; Referee: Hüseyin Göçek (Turkey)

29 May Friendly	Armenia	1–1	Malta	Wattens, Austria
20:00 (UTC+2)	Yagan 13'	Report	Agius 45+1' (pen.)	Stadium: Gernot Langes Stadion; Referee: Julian Weinberger (Austria)

1 June Friendly	Georgia	1–0	Malta	Schwaz, Austria
20:00 (UTC+2)	Kashia 89' (pen.)	Report		Stadium: Silberstadt Arena Schwaz; Attendance: 50; Referee: Manuel Schüttengruber (Austria)

7 September 2018–19 UEFA Nations League	Faroe Islands	3–1	Malta	Tórshavn, Faroe Islands
20:45 (19:45 UTC+1)	Edmundsson 31'; Joensen 38'; Hansson 52'	Report	Mifsud 42'	Stadium: Tórsvøllur; Attendance: 3,234; Referee: Ville Nevalainen (Finland)

10 September 2018–19 UEFA Nations League	Malta	1–1	Azerbaijan	Ta' Qali, Malta
20:45 (UTC+2)	Agius 10' (pen.)	Report	Khalilzade 26'	Stadium: National Stadium; Attendance: 4,500; Referee: Nikola Dabanović (Montenegro)

11 October 2018–19 UEFA Nations League	Kosovo	3–1	Malta	Pristina, Kosovo
20:45 (UTC+2)	Kololli 30', 81'; Muriqi 68'	Report	Agius 51'	Stadium: Fadil Vokrri Stadium; Attendance: 12,365; Referee: Tamás Bognár (Hungary)

14 October 2018–19 UEFA Nations League	Azerbaijan	1–1	Malta	Baku, Azerbaijan
18:00 (20:00 UTC+4)	Abdullayev 53'	Report	Muscat 37'	Stadium: Olympic Stadium; Attendance: 16,200; Referee: Ivan Bebek (Croatia)

17 November 2018–19 UEFA Nations League	Malta	0–5	Kosovo	Ta' Qali, Malta
18:00 (UTC+2)		Report	Muriqi 15'; Kololli 70'; Avdijaj 78', 80'; Rashica 86'	Stadium: National Stadium; Attendance: 2,115; Referee: Bartosz Frankowski (Poland)

20 November 2018–19 UEFA Nations League	Malta	1–1	Faroe Islands	Ta' Qali, Malta
20:45 (UTC+2)	Corbalan 4'	Report	Joensen 3'	Stadium: National Stadium; Attendance: 2,152; Referee: Vitali Meshkov (Russia)

=== 2019 ===
23 March UEFA Euro 2020 qualifying	Malta	2–1	Faroe Islands	Ta' Qali, Malta
18:00 (UTC+1)	Nwoko 13'; Borg 77' (pen.)	Report	Thomsen 90+8'	Stadium: National Stadium; Attendance: 7,531; Referee: Vilhjálmur Þórarinsson (Iceland)

26 March UEFA Euro 2020 qualifying	Malta	0–2	Spain	Ta' Qali, Malta
20:45 (UTC+1)		Report	Morata 31', 73'	Stadium: National Stadium; Attendance: 16,542; Referee: Andrew Dallas (Scotland)

7 June UEFA Euro 2020 qualifying	Sweden	3–0	Malta	Solna, Sweden
20:45 (UTC+2)	Quaison 2'; Claesson 50'; Isak 81'	Report		Stadium: Friends Arena; Attendance: 26,421; Referee: Rob Harvey (Republic of Ireland)

10 June UEFA Euro 2020 qualifying	Malta	0–4	Romania	Ta' Qali, Malta
20:45 (UTC+2)		Report	Pușcaș 7', 29'; Chipciu 34'; Man 90+1'	Stadium: National Stadium; Attendance: 6,471; Referee: Dennis Higler (Netherlands)

5 September UEFA Euro 2020 qualifying	Norway	2–0	Malta	Oslo, Norway
20:45 (UTC+2)	Berge 34'; King 45+1' (pen.)	Report		Stadium: Ullevaal Stadion; Attendance: 11,269; Referee: Dumitri Muntean (Moldova)

8 September UEFA Euro 2020 qualifying	Romania	1–0	Malta	Ploiești, Romania
18:00 (19:00 UTC+3)	Pușcaș 47'	Report		Stadium: Ilie Oană Stadium; Attendance: 13,376; Referee: Duje Strukan (Croatia)

12 October UEFA Euro 2020 qualifying	Malta	0–4	Sweden	Ta' Qali, Malta
20:45 (UTC+2)		Report	Danielson 11'; Se. Larsson 58' (pen.), 71' (pen.); Agius 66' (o.g.)	Stadium: National Stadium; Attendance: 10,702; Referee: Sergey Ivanov (Russia)

15 October UEFA Euro 2020 qualifying	Faroe Islands	1–0	Malta	Tórshavn, Faroe Islands
20:45 (19:45 UTC+1)	Baldvinsson 71'	Report		Stadium: Tórsvøllur; Attendance: 2,677; Referee: José María Sánchez Martínez (Spain)

15 November UEFA Euro 2020 qualifying	Spain	7–0	Malta	Cádiz, Spain
20:45 (UTC+1)	Morata 23'; Cazorla 41'; Torres 62'; Sarabia 63'; Olmo 69'; Moreno 71'; Navas 85'	Report		Stadium: Ramón de Carranza; Attendance: 19,773; Referee: Viktor Kassai (Hungary)

18 November UEFA Euro 2020 qualifying	Malta	1–2	Norway	Ta' Qali, Malta
20:45 (UTC+1)	Fenech 40'	Report	King 7'; Sørloth 62'	Stadium: National Stadium; Attendance: 2,708; Referee: Aliyar Aghayev (Azerbaijan)
