= 2004 Malta International Football Tournament =

Tournament details
- Host country: Malta
- Dates: 14–18 February
- Teams: 4
- Venue(s): 1 (in 1 host city)

Final positions
- Champions: Belarus U-21
- Runners-up: Estonia
- Third place: Malta
- Fourth place: Moldova

Tournament statistics
- Matches played: 6
- Goals scored: 16 (2.67 per match)
- Top scorer(s): (Malta) Etienne Barbara (2 goals)

The 2004 Malta International Tournament (known as the Rothmans Tournament for sponsorship reasons) was the 12th edition of the Malta International Tournament. Held between 14 February and 18 February 2004, the tournament was contested by host country Malta, Estonia, Moldova and Belarus U-21.

== Matches ==
Pos	Team	Pld	W	D	L	GF	GA	GD	Pts
1	Belarus U-21 (C)	3	2	0	1	6	2	+4	6
2	Estonia	3	2	0	1	5	6	−1	6
3	Malta (H)	3	1	1	1	5	6	−1	4
4	Moldova	3	0	1	2	0	2	−2	1

Source: RSSSF
(C) Champions; (H) Hosts
14 February 2004
16:15 (UTC+1:00)

Malta	0–0	Moldova
	Report

National Stadium, Ta' Qali
Attendance: 1,000
Referee: Valery Vyalichka (Belarus)

14 February 2004
14:00 (+1:00)

Belarus U-21	1–2	Estonia
Tarasenko 90'	Report; Report2	Rooba 13'; Lemsalu 44'

National Stadium, Ta' Qali
Attendance: 200
Referee: Adrian Casha (Malta)

16 February 2004
16:00 (UTC+1:00)

Belarus U-21	1–0	Moldova
Kirenkin 39'	Report; Report2

National Stadium, Ta' Qali
Attendance: 50
Referee: Joseph Attard (Malta)

16 February 2004
18:15 (UTC+1:00)

Malta	5–2	Estonia
Barbara 12', 60'; Said 28'; Turner 58'; Zahra 87'	Report	Zahovaiko 16'; Piiroja 45'

National Stadium, Ta' Qali
Attendance: 500
Referee: Ghenadie Orlic (Moldova)

18 February 2004
18:15 (UTC+1:00)

Malta	0–4	Belarus U-21
	Report; Report2	Kornilenko 11'; Tsygalko 29'; Biahanski 70'; Lashankou 85'

National Stadium, Ta' Qali
Attendance: 4,000
Referee: Sten Kaldma (Estonia)

18 February 2004
16:00 (UTC+1:00)

Estonia	1–0	Moldova
Lindpere 58'	Report

National Stadium, Ta' Qali
Attendance: 300
Referee: Lorry Sammut (Malta)

== Winner ==
2004 Malta Tournament winner

Belarus U-21

== Statistics ==
=== Goalscorers ===
There were 16 goals scored in 6 matches, for an average of 2.67 goals per match.

2 goals

- (Malta) Etienne Barbara

1 goal

- (Belarus) Maksim Tsygalko
- (Belarus) Pavel Biahanski
- (Belarus) Sergei Kornilenko
- (Belarus) Roman Kirenkin
- (Belarus) Valeri Tarasenko
- (Belarus) Yevgeni Lashankou
- (Estonia) Joel Lindpere
- (Estonia) Meelis Rooba
- (Estonia) Marek Lemsalu
- (Estonia) Vjatšeslav Zahovaiko
- (Estonia) Raio Piiroja
- (Malta) Antoine Zahra
- (Malta) Brian Said
- (Malta) Noel Turner

Source: EU-Football

== See also ==
- China Cup
- Cyprus International Football Tournament
