= Yury Tsyhalka =

Belarusian footballer (1983–2026)

Personal information
- Date of birth: 27 May 1983
- Place of birth: Minsk, Belarusian SSR, Soviet Union
- Date of death: 22 October 2026 (aged 43)
- Height: 6 ft 1 in (1.85 m)
- Position: Goalkeeper

Youth career
- 2000–2001: Dinamo Minsk

Senior career*
Years	Team	Apps	(Gls)
2000–2001	Dinamo-Yuni Minsk	16	(0)
2000	→ Dinamo-2 Minsk	6	(0)
2001–2005	Dinamo Minsk	61	(0)
2004	→ Dinamo-Yuni Minsk	8	(0)
2005	Vostok Ust-Kamenogorsk	8	(0)
2006–2007	Dinamo Brest	27	(0)
2008–2009	Pandurii Târgu Jiu	0	(0)
2008	→ CSM Râmnicu Vâlcea (loan)	3	(0)
2009	→ Energia Rovinari (loan)		
2009–2010	Vostok Ust-Kamenogorsk	10	(0)
2010–2013	Shakhtyor Soligorsk	100	(0)

International career
2002–2004	Belarus U21	5	(0)
2003	Belarus	3	(0)
- * Club domestic league appearances and goals

Yury Uladzimiravich Tsyhalka (Belarusian: Юры Уладзіміравіч Цыгалка; Russian: Юрий Владимирович Цыгалко, romanized: Yuriy Vladimirovich Tsygalko; 27 May 1983 – 22 October 2026) was a Belarusian footballer who played as a goalkeeper. He was capped three times for Belarus national team.

Tsyhalka died on 22 October 2026, at the age of 43. His twin brother, Maksim, was also a former Belarus international.

== Honours ==
Dinamo Minsk

- Belarusian Premier League: 2004
- Belarusian Cup: 2002–03

Dinamo Brest

- Belarusian Cup: 2006–07
