= 2006 Malta International Football Tournament =

Tournament details
- Host country: Malta
- Dates: 25 February – 1 May
- Teams: 3
- Venue(s): 1 (in 1 host city)

Final positions
- Champions: Moldova (1st title)
- Runners-up: Lithuania
- Third place: Jordan
- Fourth place: Moldova

Tournament statistics
- Matches played: 3
- Goals scored: 10 (3.33 per match)
- Attendance: 2,425 (808 per match)
- Top scorer(s): (Moldova) Alexandru Zislis (2 goals)

The 2006 Malta International Football Tournament was the thirteenth edition of the Malta International Tournament, a biannual football competition organised by the Malta Football Association. Sponsored by Coca-Cola and Multiplus, the competition was held in Malta between 25 February and 1 May 2006.

Initially, Libya was to be among the participants but dropped off before the start, leading to a final three participating countries.

== Matches ==
Pos	Team	Pld	W	D	L	GF	GA	GD	Pts
1	Moldova U-21 (C)	2	2	0	0	7	1	+6	6
2	Georgia	2	1	0	1	3	5	−2	3
3	Malta (H)	2	0	0	2	0	4	−4	0

Source: RSSSF
(C) Champions; (H) Hosts
25 February 2006

Malta	0–2	Moldova U-21
	Report	Namașco 46'; Bugaiov 73'

National Stadium, Ta' Qali
Attendance: 1,225
Referee: Lasha Silagava (Georgia)

27 February 2006

Moldova U-21	5–1	Georgia
Zislis 5', 13'; Alexeev 48'; Suvorov 59' (pen.); Zmeu 71'	Report	Tskitishvili 18' (pen.)

National Stadium, Ta' Qali
Attendance: 100
Referee: Adrian Casha (Malta)

1 March 2005

Malta	0–2	Georgia
	Report	Martsvaladze 8'; Kankava 18'

National Stadium, Ta' Qali
Attendance: 1,100
Referee: Veaceslav Banari (Moldova)

== Winner ==
2006 Malta Tournament winner

Moldova
Second title

== Statistics ==
=== Goalscorers ===
There were 10 goals scored in 3 matches, for an average of 3.33 goals per match.

2 goals

- (Moldova) Alexandru Zislis

1 goal

- (Moldova) Alexandru Suvorov
- (Moldova) Denis Zmeu
- (Moldova) Igor Bugaiov
- (Moldova) Serghei Alexeev
- (Moldova) Serghei Namașco
- (Georgia (country)) Levan Tskitishvili
- (Georgia (country)) Otar Martsvaladze
- (Georgia (country)) Jaba Kankava

Source: EU-Football

== See also ==
- China Cup
- Cyprus International Football Tournament
