= Juan Carlos Corbalan =

Maltese footballer (born 1997)

Juan Corbalan
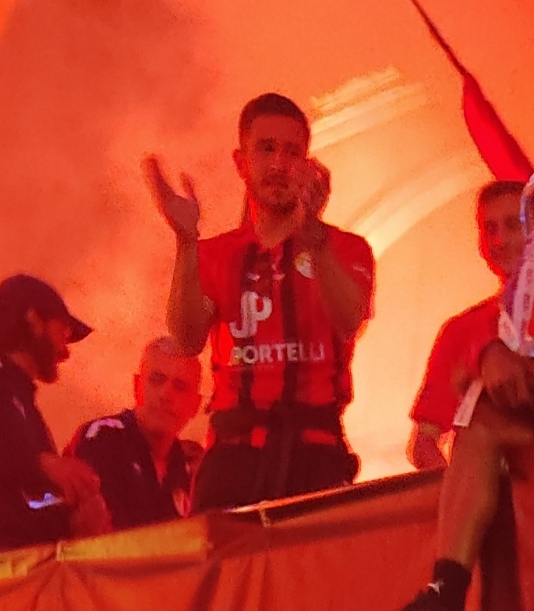
- Corbalan during Ħamrun Spartans' Premier League Victory celebrations

Personal information
- Full name: Juan Carlos Corbalan
- Date of birth: 3 January 1997 (age 29)
- Place of birth: Buenos Aires, Argentina
- Height: 1.69 m (5 ft 7 in)
- Position: Winger

Team information
- Current team: Marsaxlokk
- Number: 14

Youth career
- Balzan

Senior career*
Years	Team	Apps	(Gls)
2012–2016	Balzan	6	(0)
2016–2019	Gżira United	87	(6)
2019–2024	Ħamrun Spartans	92	(3)
2025–	Marsaxlokk	43	(1)

International career^{‡}
2012–2014	Malta U17	8	(0)
2015	Malta U19	3	(0)
2016–2018	Malta U21	6	(0)
2018–	Malta	43	(1)
- * Club domestic league appearances and goals as of 7 May 2026 ‡ National team caps and goals as of 21:32, 16 November 2026 (UTC)

Juan Carlos Corbalan (born 3 January 1997) is a Maltese footballer who plays as a winger for Maltese Premier League club Marsaxlokk. Born in Argentina, he represents Malta at international level.

== Club career ==
Corbalan started his career within Balzan's youth system, making his debut for the senior team on 24 February 2013 in a 3–1 win against Ħamrun Spartans. In the end of January 2015, he joined the Virtus Lanciano's Primavera squad for a six-month period.

In the summer of 2016, Corbalan joined Gżira United, making his debut in the third game of the 2016–17 season, a 1–0 win against Sliema Wanderers. His first goal in the Premier League came on 22 September, scoring the last goal in a 3–0 win against Pembroke Athleta. Corbalan played for the first time in a European competition, coming on in the last few minutes of the 2017–18 UEFA Europa League preliminary round tie against Sant Julià played on 5 July 2017.

In 2019, Corbalan joined Ħamrun Spartans. He made his debut during Ħamrun Spartans' 4-0 victory over Sirens FC. During the 2020/21 season, he won the Maltese Premier League with Ħamrun, his first major honour. He would win the league again during the 2022/23 season and won the Maltese Super Cup during the subsequent season.In the season 2022/23 corbalan was selected with the best 11 of the season as a rwb.

== International career ==
Corbalan was selected as part of the Maltese squad for the 2014 UEFA European Under-17 Championship, playing in all three matches in the group stage.

Following appearances with the under-21 team, Corbalan was selected for the first time with the senior team for the matches against Faroe Islands and Azerbaijan as part of the 2018–19 UEFA Nations League D. His official debut came in the same competition, in the 1–3 defeat against Kosovo on 11 October 2018.

== Career statistics ==
=== International ===
As of match played 8 September 2019

National team	Year	Apps	Goals
Malta	2018	4	1
Malta	2019	6	0
Total		10	1

=== International goals ===
"Score" represents the score in the match after Corbalan's goal.

No.	Date	Venue	Opponent	Score	Result	Competition
1	19 November 2018	National Stadium, Ta' Qali, Ta' Qali, Malta	Faroe Islands	1–0	1–1	2018–19 UEFA Nations League D

== Honours ==
Ħamrun

- Maltese Premier League: 2020–21, 2022–23, 2023–24
- Maltese Super Cup: 2023,2024
