= 2018–19 UEFA Nations League D =

Tournament details
- Dates: 6 September – 20 November 2018
- Teams: 16
- Promoted: Armenia; Azerbaijan; Belarus; Georgia; Kazakhstan; Kosovo; Luxembourg; Macedonia; Moldova

Tournament statistics
- Matches played: 48
- Goals scored: 121 (2.52 per match)
- Attendance: 435,442 (9,072 per match)
- Top scorer(s): (Armenia) Yura Movsisyan (Belarus) Stanislaw Drahun (5 goals each)

The 2018–19 UEFA Nations League D was the fourth and lowest division of the 2018–19 edition of the UEFA Nations League, the inaugural season of the international football competition involving the men's national teams of the 55 member associations of UEFA.

== Format ==
League D consisted of the lowest 16 UEFA members ranked from 40 to 55, who were split into four groups of four. The top two teams of each group, as well as the best ranked third-place team, were promoted to the 2020–21 UEFA Nations League C.

In addition, League D was allocated one of the four remaining UEFA Euro 2020 places. Four teams from League D which had not already qualified for the European Championship finals competed in the play-offs for each division, which were played in October and November 2020. The play-off berths were first allocated to the group winners, and if any of the group winners had already qualified for the European Championship finals, then to the next best ranked team of the division, etc. If there were fewer than four teams in League D which had not already qualified for the European Championship finals, and League D had no group winner available, the best team in the overall ranking would be selected. The play-offs consisted of two "one-off" semi-finals (best-ranked team vs. fourth best-ranked team and second best-ranked team vs. third best-ranked team, played at home of higher-ranked teams) and one "one-off" final between the two semi-final winners (venue drawn in advance between semi-final 1 and 2).

=== Seeding ===
Teams were allocated to League D according to their UEFA national team coefficients after the conclusion of the 2018 FIFA World Cup qualifying group stage on 11 October 2017. Teams were split into four pots of four teams, ordered based on their UEFA national team coefficient. The seeding pots for the draw were announced on 7 December 2017.

Pot 1
Team	Coeff	Rank
Azerbaijan	17,761	40
Macedonia	17,071	41
Belarus	16,868	42
Georgia	16,523	43

Pot 2
Team	Coeff	Rank
Armenia	15,846	44
Latvia	15,821	45
Faroe Islands	15,490	46
Luxembourg	14,231	47

Pot 3
Team	Coeff	Rank
Kazakhstan	13,431	48
Moldova	13,130	49
Liechtenstein	10,950	50
Malta	10,870	51

Pot 4
Team	Coeff	Rank
Andorra	10,240	52
Kosovo	9,950	53
San Marino	8,190	54
Gibraltar	7,550	55

The group draw took place at the SwissTech Convention Center in Lausanne, Switzerland on 24 January 2018, 12:00 CET. For political reasons, Armenia and Azerbaijan could not be drawn into the same group (due to the Nagorno-Karabakh conflict). Due to excessive travel restrictions, any group could only contain a maximum of one of the following pairs: Andorra and Kazakhstan, Faroe Islands and Kazakhstan, Gibraltar and Kazakhstan, Gibraltar and Azerbaijan.

== Groups ==
The fixture list was confirmed by UEFA on 24 January 2018 following the draw.

Times are CET/CEST, (Note: CEST (UTC+2) for matchdays 1–4 (September and October 2018), CET (UTC+1) for matchdays 5–6 (November 2018).) as listed by UEFA (local times, if different, are in parentheses).

=== Group 1 ===
Pos	Team	Pld	W	D	L	GF	GA	GD	Pts	Promotion (Note: Due to revamp of the format for the 2020–21 UEFA Nations League, the second-placed teams in each group and the best third-placed team among all groups were also promoted.)	(Georgia (country))	(Kazakhstan)	(Latvia)	(Andorra)
1	Georgia (P)	6	5	1	0	12	2	+10	16	Promotion to League C	—	2–1	1–0	3–0
2	Kazakhstan (P)	6	1	3	2	8	7	+1	6	Promotion to League C	0–2	—	1–1	4–0
3	Latvia	6	0	4	2	2	6	−4	4 (Note: Tied on head-to-head results. Overall goal difference was used as the tiebreaker.)		0–3	1–1	—	0–0
4	Andorra	6	0	4	2	2	9	−7	4		1–1	1–1	0–0	—

Source: UEFA
Rules for classification: Tiebreakers
(P) Promoted
Notes:
6 September 2018
16:00 (20:00 UTC+6)

Kazakhstan	0–2	Georgia
	Report	Chakvetadze 69'; Malyi 74' (o.g.)

Astana Arena, Astana
Attendance: 28,736
Referee: Halil Umut Meler (Turkey)
6 September 2018
20:45 (21:45 UTC+3)

Latvia	0–0	Andorra
	Report

Daugava Stadium, Riga
Attendance: 4,803
Referee: Keith Kennedy (Northern Ireland)

9 September 2018
18:00 (20:00 UTC+4)

Georgia	1–0	Latvia
Okriashvili 77' (pen.)	Report

Boris Paichadze Dinamo Arena, Tbilisi
Attendance: 45,716
Referee: Anastasios Papapetrou (Greece)
10 September 2018
20:45

Andorra	1–1	Kazakhstan
Aláez 86'	Report	Logvinenko 68'

Estadi Nacional, Andorra la Vella
Attendance: 1,235
Referee: Vilhjálmur Þórarinsson (Iceland)

13 October 2018
18:00 (20:00 UTC+4)

Georgia	3–0	Andorra
Qazaishvili 33', 84'; Kankava 90+5'	Report

Boris Paichadze Dinamo Arena, Tbilisi
Attendance: 32,212
Referee: Leontios Trattou (Cyprus)
13 October 2018
18:00 (19:00 UTC+3)

Latvia	1–1	Kazakhstan
Karašausks 40'	Report	Zaynutdinov 16'

Daugava Stadium, Riga
Attendance: 4,878
Referee: Harald Lechner (Austria)

16 October 2018
16:00 (20:00 UTC+6)

Kazakhstan	4–0	Andorra
Seydakhmet 21'; Turysbek 39'; Gómes 61' (o.g.); Murtazayev 74'	Report

Astana Arena, Astana
Attendance: 19,854
Referee: Serhiy Boyko (Ukraine)
16 October 2018
20:45 (21:45 UTC+3)

Latvia	0–3	Georgia
	Report	Kankava 8'; Gvilia 29'; Chakvetadze 61'

Daugava Stadium, Riga
Attendance: 3,185
Referee: Petr Ardeleánu (Czech Republic)

15 November 2018
16:00 (21:00 UTC+6)

Kazakhstan	1–1	Latvia
Suyumbayev 37'	Report	Rakels 49'

Astana Arena, Astana
Attendance: 21,463
Referee: Jens Maae (Denmark)
15 November 2018 (Note: The Andorra v Georgia match, originally scheduled on 16 November 2018, was moved to the previous day at the same time to allow for an equal rest period.)
20:45

Andorra	1–1	Georgia
C. Martínez 63'	Report	Chakvetadze 9'

Estadi Nacional, Andorra la Vella
Attendance: 1,311
Referee: Radu Petrescu (Romania)

19 November 2018
18:00

Andorra	0–0	Latvia
	Report

Estadi Nacional, Andorra la Vella
Attendance: 1,021
Referee: Halil Umut Meler (Turkey)
19 November 2018
18:00 (21:00 UTC+4)

Georgia	2–1	Kazakhstan
Merebashvili 59'; Chakvetadze 84'	Report	Omirtayev 90'

Boris Paichadze Dinamo Arena, Tbilisi
Attendance: 52,220
Referee: Tiago Martins (Portugal)

=== Group 2 ===
Pos	Team	Pld	W	D	L	GF	GA	GD	Pts	Promotion (Note: Due to revamp of the format for the 2020–21 UEFA Nations League, the second-placed teams in each group and the best third-placed team among all groups were also promoted.)	(Belarus)	(Luxembourg)	(Moldova)	(San Marino)
1	Belarus (P)	6	4	2	0	10	0	+10	14	Promotion to League C	—	1–0	0–0	5–0
2	Luxembourg (P)	6	3	1	2	11	4	+7	10	Promotion to League C	0–2	—	4–0	3–0
3	Moldova (P)	6	2	3	1	4	5	−1	9	Promotion to League C	0–0	1–1	—	2–0
4	San Marino	6	0	0	6	0	16	−16	0		0–2	0–3	0–1	—

Source: UEFA
Rules for classification: Tiebreakers
(P) Promoted
Notes:
8 September 2018
18:00 (19:00 UTC+3)

Belarus	5–0	San Marino
Stasevich 4'; Drahun 26', 87'; Saroka 67' (pen.); Kavalyow 90+1'	Report

Dinamo Stadium, Minsk
Attendance: 13,634
Referee: Sandro Schärer (Switzerland)
8 September 2018
20:45

Luxembourg	4–0	Moldova
Malget 34'; O. Thill 60'; Sinani 75'; Martins 83'	Report

Stade Josy Barthel, Luxembourg City
Attendance: 2,956
Referee: Rob Harvey (Republic of Ireland)

11 September 2018
20:45

San Marino	0–3	Luxembourg
	Report	Chanot 9'; Joachim 45+1'; Sinani 52'

San Marino Stadium, Serravalle
Attendance: 794
Referee: Filip Glova (Slovakia)
11 September 2018
20:45 (21:45 UTC+3)

Moldova	0–0	Belarus
	Report

Zimbru Stadium, Chișinău
Attendance: 4,942
Referee: Mario Zebec (Croatia)

12 October 2018
20:45 (21:45 UTC+3)

Belarus	1–0	Luxembourg
Saroka 43'	Report

Dinamo Stadium, Minsk
Attendance: 14,122
Referee: Ali Palabıyık (Turkey)
12 October 2018
20:45 (21:45 UTC+3)

Moldova	2–0	San Marino
Gînsari 31', 67'	Report

Zimbru Stadium, Chișinău
Attendance: 5,242
Referee: Bryn Markham-Jones (Wales)

15 October 2018
20:45 (21:45 UTC+3)

Belarus	0–0	Moldova
	Report

Dinamo Stadium, Minsk
Attendance: 10,870
Referee: Kevin Clancy (Scotland)
15 October 2018
20:45

Luxembourg	3–0	San Marino
Turpel 4'; Sinani 65'; V. Thill 73'	Report

Stade Josy Barthel, Luxembourg City
Attendance: 2,876
Referee: Aleksandrs Golubevs (Latvia)

15 November 2018
20:45

San Marino	0–1	Moldova
	Report	Damașcan 78'

San Marino Stadium, Serravalle
Attendance: 747
Referee: Georgios Kominis (Greece)
15 November 2018
20:45

Luxembourg	0–2	Belarus
	Report	Drahun 37', 54'

Stade Josy Barthel, Luxembourg City
Attendance: 4,533
Referee: Serdar Gözübüyük (Netherlands)

18 November 2018
18:00 (19:00 UTC+2)

Moldova	1–1	Luxembourg
Gînsari 58' (pen.)	Report	Bensi 70'

Zimbru Stadium, Chișinău
Attendance: 4,642
Referee: Adrien Jaccottet (Switzerland)
18 November 2018
18:00

San Marino	0–2	Belarus
	Report	Drahun 8'; Saroka 52'

San Marino Stadium, Serravalle
Attendance: 736
Referee: Giorgi Kruashvili (Georgia)

=== Group 3 ===
Pos	Team	Pld	W	D	L	GF	GA	GD	Pts	Promotion (Note: Due to revamp of the format for the 2020–21 UEFA Nations League, the second-placed teams in each group and the best third-placed team among all groups were also promoted.)	(Kosovo)	(Azerbaijan)	(Faroe Islands)	(Malta)
1	Kosovo (P)	6	4	2	0	15	2	+13	14	Promotion to League C	—	4–0	2–0	3–1
2	Azerbaijan (P)	6	2	3	1	7	6	+1	9	Promotion to League C	0–0	—	2–0	1–1
3	Faroe Islands	6	1	2	3	5	10	−5	5		1–1	0–3	—	3–1
4	Malta	6	0	3	3	5	14	−9	3		0–5	1–1	1–1	—

Source: UEFA
Rules for classification: Tiebreakers
(P) Promoted
Notes:
7 September 2018
18:00 (20:00 UTC+4)

Azerbaijan	0–0	Kosovo
	Report

Olympic Stadium, Baku
Attendance: 19,500
Referee: Ola Hobber Nilsen (Norway)
7 September 2018
20:45 (19:45 UTC+1)

Faroe Islands	3–1	Malta
Edmundsson 31'; Joensen 38'; Hansson 52'	Report	Mifsud 42'

Tórsvøllur, Tórshavn
Attendance: 3,234
Referee: Ville Nevalainen (Finland)

10 September 2018
20:45

Kosovo	2–0	Faroe Islands
Zeneli 50'; Nuhiu 55'	Report

Fadil Vokrri Stadium, Pristina
Attendance: 12,677
Referee: Bart Vertenten (Belgium)
10 September 2018
20:45

Malta	1–1	Azerbaijan
Agius 10' (pen.)	Report	Khalilzade 26'

National Stadium, Ta' Qali
Attendance: 4,500
Referee: Nikola Dabanović (Montenegro)

11 October 2018
20:45 (19:45 UTC+1)

Faroe Islands	0–3	Azerbaijan
	Report	Almeida 28', 86' (pen.); Nazarov 67'

Tórsvøllur, Tórshavn
Attendance: 2,820
Referee: Aleksei Eskov (Russia)
11 October 2018
20:45

Kosovo	3–1	Malta
Kololli 30', 81'; Muriqi 68'	Report	Agius 51'

Fadil Vokrri Stadium, Pristina
Attendance: 12,420
Referee: Tamás Bognár (Hungary)

14 October 2018
18:00 (20:00 UTC+4)

Azerbaijan	1–1	Malta
Abdullayev 53'	Report	Muscat 37'

Olympic Stadium, Baku
Attendance: 16,200
Referee: Ivan Bebek (Croatia)
14 October 2018
18:00 (17:00 UTC+1)

Faroe Islands	1–1	Kosovo
Joensen 50'	Report	Rashica 9'

Tórsvøllur, Tórshavn
Attendance: 2,300
Referee: Miroslav Zelinka (Czech Republic)

17 November 2018
18:00 (21:00 UTC+4)

Azerbaijan	2–0	Faroe Islands
Nazarov 18'; Madatov 28'	Report

Olympic Stadium, Baku
Attendance: 12,653
Referee: Demetrios Masias (Cyprus)
17 November 2018
18:00

Malta	0–5	Kosovo
	Report	Muriqi 15'; Kololli 70'; Avdijaj 78', 80'; Rashica 86'

National Stadium, Ta' Qali
Attendance: 2,115
Referee: Bartosz Frankowski (Poland)

20 November 2018
20:45

Kosovo	4–0	Azerbaijan
Zeneli 2', 50', 76'; Rrahmani 61'	Report

Fadil Vokrri Stadium, Pristina
Attendance: 12,532
Referee: Benoît Millot (France)
20 November 2018
20:45

Malta	1–1	Faroe Islands
Corbalan 4'	Report	Joensen 3'

National Stadium, Ta' Qali
Attendance: 2,152
Referee: Vitali Meshkov (Russia)

=== Group 4 ===
Pos	Team	Pld	W	D	L	GF	GA	GD	Pts	Promotion (Note: Due to revamp of the format for the 2020–21 UEFA Nations League, the second-placed teams in each group and the best third-placed team among all groups were also promoted.)	(North Macedonia)	(Armenia)	(Gibraltar)	(Liechtenstein)
1	Macedonia (P)	6	5	0	1	14	5	+9	15	Promotion to League C	—	2–0	4–0	4–1
2	Armenia (P)	6	3	1	2	14	8	+6	10	Promotion to League C	4–0	—	0–1	2–1
3	Gibraltar	6	2	0	4	5	15	−10	6		0–2	2–6	—	2–1
4	Liechtenstein	6	1	1	4	7	12	−5	4		0–2	2–2	2–0	—

Source: UEFA
Rules for classification: Tiebreakers
(P) Promoted
Notes:
6 September 2018
18:00 (20:00 UTC+4)

Armenia	2–1	Liechtenstein
Pizzelli 30'; Barseghyan 76'	Report	S. Wolfinger 33'

Vazgen Sargsyan Republican Stadium, Yerevan
Attendance: 5,132
Referee: Enea Jorgji (Albania)
6 September 2018
20:45

Gibraltar	0–2	Macedonia
	Report	Trichkovski 19'; Alioski 35'

Victoria Stadium, Gibraltar
Attendance: 1,850
Referee: Jens Maae (Denmark)

9 September 2018
18:00

Macedonia	2–0	Armenia
Alioski 14' (pen.); Pandev 59'	Report

Philip II Arena, Skopje
Attendance: 4,730
Referee: Manuel Schüttengruber (Austria)
9 September 2018
20:45

Liechtenstein	2–0	Gibraltar
Salanović 32'; Wieser 72'	Report

Rheinpark Stadion, Vaduz
Attendance: 1,110
Referee: Alan Mario Sant (Malta)

13 October 2018
18:00 (20:00 UTC+4)

Armenia	0–1	Gibraltar
	Report	J. Chipolina 50' (pen.)

Vazgen Sargsyan Republican Stadium, Yerevan
Attendance: 11,000
Referee: Fedayi San (Switzerland)
13 October 2018
20:45

Macedonia	4–1	Liechtenstein
Trajkovski 10', 30'; Pandev 36'; Alioski 67'	Report	Yildiz 37'

Philip II Arena, Skopje
Attendance: 8,100
Referee: Roi Reinshreiber (Israel)

16 October 2018
18:00 (20:00 UTC+4)

Armenia	4–0	Macedonia
Pizzelli 12'; Movsisyan 67'; Ghazaryan 81'; Mkhitaryan 90+4'	Report

Vazgen Sargsyan Republican Stadium, Yerevan
Attendance: 8,300
Referee: Martin Strömbergsson (Sweden)
16 October 2018
20:45

Gibraltar	2–1	Liechtenstein
Cabrera 61'; J. Chipolina 66'	Report	Salanović 15'

Victoria Stadium, Gibraltar
Attendance: 2,000
Referee: Vasilis Dimitriou (Cyprus)

16 November 2018
20:45

Gibraltar	2–6	Armenia
De Barr 10'; Priestley 78'	Report	Movsisyan 27', 48', 52', 54'; Kartashyan 66'; Karapetian 90+4'

Victoria Stadium, Gibraltar
Attendance: 1,955
Referee: Kai Erik Steen (Norway)
16 November 2018
20:45

Liechtenstein	0–2	Macedonia
	Report	Bardhi 53'; Nestorovski 90+1'

Rheinpark Stadion, Vaduz
Attendance: 2,116
Referee: Petr Ardeleánu (Czech Republic)

19 November 2018
20:45

Macedonia	4–0	Gibraltar
Bardhi 27'; Nestorovski 67', 80'; Trajkovski 90+2'	Report

Philip II Arena, Skopje
Attendance: 2,152
Referee: Daniyar Sakhi (Kazakhstan)
19 November 2018
20:45

Liechtenstein	2–2	Armenia
Büchel 44'; Hasler 47'	Report	Adamyan 9'; Karapetian 85'

Rheinpark Stadion, Vaduz
Attendance: 1,166
Referee: Alain Durieux (Luxembourg)

== Ranking of third-placed teams ==
Pos	Grp	Team	Pld	W	D	L	GF	GA	GD	Pts	Promotion
1	D2	Moldova (P)	6	2	3	1	4	5	−1	9	Promotion to League C
2	D4	Gibraltar	6	2	0	4	5	15	−10	6	
3	D3	Faroe Islands	6	1	2	3	5	10	−5	5	
4	D1	Latvia	6	0	4	2	2	6	−4	4	

Source: UEFA
Rules for classification: 1) Points; 2) Goal difference; 3) Goals scored; 4) Away goals scored; 5) Wins; 6) Away wins; 7) Disciplinary points; 8) UEFA national team coefficient.
(P) Promoted

== Goalscorers ==
There were 121 goals scored in 48 matches, for an average of 2.52 goals per match.

5 goals

- (Armenia) Yura Movsisyan
- (Belarus) Stanislaw Drahun

4 goals

- (Georgia (country)) Giorgi Chakvetadze
- (Kosovo) Arbër Zeneli

3 goals

- (Belarus) Anton Saroka
- (Faroe Islands) René Joensen
- (Kosovo) Benjamin Kololli
- (Luxembourg) Danel Sinani
- (North Macedonia) Ezgjan Alioski
- (North Macedonia) Ilija Nestorovski
- (North Macedonia) Aleksandar Trajkovski
- (Moldova) Radu Gînsari

2 goals

- (Armenia) Aleksandre Karapetian
- (Armenia) Marcos Pizzelli
- (Azerbaijan) Richard Almeida
- (Azerbaijan) Dimitrij Nazarov
- (Georgia (country)) Jaba Kankava
- (Georgia (country)) Valeri Qazaishvili
- (Gibraltar) Joseph Chipolina
- (Kosovo) Donis Avdijaj
- (Kosovo) Vedat Muriqi
- (Kosovo) Milot Rashica
- (Liechtenstein) Dennis Salanović
- (North Macedonia) Enis Bardhi
- (North Macedonia) Goran Pandev
- (Malta) Andrei Agius

1 goal

- (Andorra) Jordi Aláez
- (Andorra) Cristian Martínez
- (Armenia) Sargis Adamyan
- (Armenia) Tigran Barseghyan
- (Armenia) Gevorg Ghazaryan
- (Armenia) Artur Kartashyan
- (Armenia) Henrikh Mkhitaryan
- (Azerbaijan) Araz Abdullayev
- (Azerbaijan) Tamkin Khalilzade
- (Azerbaijan) Mahir Madatov
- (Belarus) Yury Kavalyow
- (Belarus) Ihar Stasevich
- (Faroe Islands) Jóan Símun Edmundsson
- (Faroe Islands) Hallur Hansson
- (Georgia (country)) Valerian Gvilia
- (Georgia (country)) Giorgi Merebashvili
- (Georgia (country)) Tornike Okriashvili
- (Gibraltar) George Cabrera
- (Gibraltar) Tjay De Barr
- (Gibraltar) Adam Priestley
- (Kazakhstan) Yuriy Logvinenko
- (Kazakhstan) Roman Murtazayev
- (Kazakhstan) Oralkhan Omirtayev
- (Kazakhstan) Yerkebulan Seydakhmet
- (Kazakhstan) Gafurzhan Suyumbayev
- (Kazakhstan) Bauyrzhan Turysbek
- (Kazakhstan) Baktiyar Zaynutdinov
- (Kosovo) Atdhe Nuhiu
- (Kosovo) Amir Rrahmani
- (Latvia) Artūrs Karašausks
- (Latvia) Deniss Rakels
- (Liechtenstein) Marcel Büchel
- (Liechtenstein) Nicolas Hasler
- (Liechtenstein) Sandro Wieser
- (Liechtenstein) Sandro Wolfinger
- (Liechtenstein) Seyhan Yildiz
- (Luxembourg) Stefano Bensi
- (Luxembourg) Maxime Chanot
- (Luxembourg) Aurélien Joachim
- (Luxembourg) Kevin Malget
- (Luxembourg) Christopher Martins
- (Luxembourg) Olivier Thill
- (Luxembourg) Vincent Thill
- (Luxembourg) David Turpel
- (North Macedonia) Ivan Trichkovski
- (Malta) Juan Carlos Corbalan
- (Malta) Michael Mifsud
- (Malta) Rowen Muscat
- (Moldova) Vitalie Damașcan

1 own goal

- (Andorra) Josep Gómes (against Kazakhstan)
- (Kazakhstan) Serhiy Malyi (against Georgia)

== Overall ranking ==
The 16 League D teams were ranked 40th to 55th overall in the 2018–19 UEFA Nations League according to the following rules:

- The teams finishing first in the groups were ranked 40th to 43rd according to the results of the league phase.
- The teams finishing second in the groups were ranked 44th to 47th according to the results of the league phase.
- The teams finishing third in the groups were ranked 48th to 51st according to the results of the league phase.
- The teams finishing fourth in the groups were ranked 52nd to 55th according to the results of the league phase.

Rnk	Grp	Team	Pld	W	D	L	GF	GA	GD	Pts
40	D1	Georgia	6	5	1	0	12	2	+10	16
41	D4	Macedonia	6	5	0	1	14	5	+9	15
42	D3	Kosovo	6	4	2	0	15	2	+13	14
43	D2	Belarus	6	4	2	0	10	0	+10	14
44	D2	Luxembourg	6	3	1	2	11	4	+7	10
45	D4	Armenia	6	3	1	2	14	8	+6	10
46	D3	Azerbaijan	6	2	3	1	7	6	+1	9
47	D1	Kazakhstan	6	1	3	2	8	7	+1	6
48	D2	Moldova	6	2	3	1	4	5	−1	9
49	D4	Gibraltar	6	2	0	4	5	15	−10	6
50	D3	Faroe Islands	6	1	2	3	5	10	−5	5
51	D1	Latvia	6	0	4	2	2	6	−4	4
52	D4	Liechtenstein	6	1	1	4	7	12	−5	4
53	D1	Andorra	6	0	4	2	2	9	−7	4
54	D3	Malta	6	0	3	3	5	14	−9	3
55	D2	San Marino	6	0	0	6	0	16	−16	0

Source: UEFA
Rules for classification: Ranking criteria

== Prize money ==
The prize money to be distributed was announced in March 2018. Each team in League D received a solidarity fee of €500,000. In addition, the four group winners received double this amount with a €500,000 bonus fee. This meant that the maximum amount of solidarity and bonus fees for a team from League D was €1 million.

== Euro 2020 qualifying play-offs ==
The four best teams in League D according to the overall ranking that did not qualify for UEFA Euro 2020 through the qualifying group stage competed in the play-offs, with the winners qualifying for the final tournament. If there had been fewer than four teams in League D that had not qualified, the remaining slots would have been allocated to teams from another league, according to the overall ranking.

League D
Rank	Team
40 ^{GW}	Georgia
41 ^{GW}	North Macedonia
42 ^{GW}	Kosovo
43 ^{GW}	Belarus
44	Luxembourg
45	Armenia
46	Azerbaijan
47	Kazakhstan
48	Moldova
49	Gibraltar
50	Faroe Islands
51	Latvia
52	Liechtenstein
53	Andorra
54	Malta
55	San Marino

Key

1. ^{GW} Nations League group winner
2. ^{H} UEFA Euro 2020 host at the time of the draw
3. Team advanced to play-offs
4. Team qualified directly to final tournament
