= René Joensen =

Faroese footballer (born 1993)

Personal information
- Full name: René Shaki Joensen
- Date of birth: 8 February 1993 (age 33)
- Place of birth: Tórshavn, Faroe Islands
- Position: Midfielder

Team information
- Current team: KÍ
- Number: 14

Youth career
- Brøndby

Senior career*
Years	Team	Apps	(Gls)
2011–2014	Brøndby	1	(0)
2014–2015	HB	40	(4)
2015–2017	Vendsyssel	38	(6)
2017–2019	Grindavík	35	(2)
2019–2022	HB	46	(7)
2022–	KÍ	90	(6)

International career^{‡}
2009	Faroe Islands U17	7	(0)
2010–2011	Faroe Islands U19	6	(0)
2011–2014	Faroe Islands U21	12	(0)
2012–	Faroe Islands	64	(3)
- * Club domestic league appearances and goals as of 1 November 2026 ‡ National team caps and goals as of 18 November 2025

René Shaki Joensen (born 8 February 1993) is a Faroese international footballer who plays as a midfielder for KÍ.

== Club career ==
Joensen started his professional career with Brøndby in Denmark. He did not appear in any matches for his team since his Danish Superliga debut in the 2011–12 season. In January 2014, he returned to the Faroe Islands to play for HB Tórshavn.

On 6 December 2021, Joensen signed a one-year contract with KÍ, starting 1 January 2022.

== International career ==
He played youth football for the Faroe Islands, before making his senior international debut in 2012.

== Personal life ==
His father is from Israel. Joensen works as an electrician

== Career statistics ==
=== International goals ===
Scores and results list Faroe Islands' goal tally first.

No.	Date	Venue	Opponent	Score	Result	Competition
1.	7 September 2018	Tórsvøllur, Tórshavn, Faroe Islands	Malta	2–0	3–1	2018–19 UEFA Nations League D
2.	14 October 2018	Tórsvøllur, Tórshavn, Faroe Islands	Kosovo	1–1	1–1	2018–19 UEFA Nations League D
3.	20 November 2018	National Stadium, Ta' Qali, Malta	Malta	1–0	1–1	2018–19 UEFA Nations League D
