= Serghei Namașco =

Moldovan footballer

Personal information
- Full name: Serghei Namașco
- Date of birth: 19 June 1984 (age 42)
- Height: 1.84 m (6 ft 0 in)
- Position: Midfielder

Team information
- Current team: FC Speranţa Crihana Veche

Senior career*
| Years | Team | Apps | (Gls) |
| 2001–2003 | FC Sheriff Tiraspol | 8 | (0) |
| 2005–2008 | FC Tiraspol | 113 | (6) |
| 2008 | FC Torpedo Moscow | 9 | (0) |
| 2009–2010 | FC Tighina | 9 | (1) |
| 2010–2011 | FC Dacia Chisinau | 14 | (1) |
| 2011–2012 | FC Zimbru Chișinău | 3 | (0) |
| 2012 | FC Sfîntul Gheorghe | 2 | (0) |
| 2012– | FC Speranţa Crihana Veche | 12 | (0) |

International career
| 2007–2009 | Moldova | 16 | (0) |
- * Club domestic league appearances and goals

Serghei Namașco (born 19 June 1984) is a Moldovan football player. He currently is signed with FC Speranţa Crihana Veche. He can play as midfielder.

He has played 16 times for Moldova. He made his debut in a 1–1 draw against Malta.

His brother, Stanislav Namașco is currently playing for Kuban Krasnodar.
