= Noel Turner (footballer) =

Maltese footballer

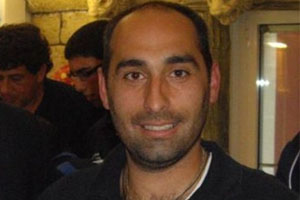

Personal information
- Date of birth: 9 December 1974 (age 51)
- Place of birth: Sliema, Malta
- Position: Midfielder

Senior career*
Years	Team	Apps	(Gls)
1991–2011	Sliema Wanderers	344	(50)

International career
1996–2004	Malta	61	(2)
- * Club domestic league appearances and goals

Noel Turner (born 9 December 1974) is a Maltese former footballer who played at both professional and international levels as a midfielder. He is married to Amy and he has 6 children. Nicole, Emma, Benjamin, Thomas, Matthew and Timothy.

== Career ==
Born in Sliema, Turner spent his entire professional career with hometown club Sliema Wanderers.

Turner earned 61 caps for Malta, appearing in 14 FIFA World Cup qualifying matches.

== See also ==
- List of one-club men
