= Maksim Tsyhalka =

Belarusian footballer (1983–2020)

Personal information
- Date of birth: 27 May 1983
- Place of birth: Minsk, Belarusian SSR, Soviet Union
- Date of death: 25 December 2020 (aged 37)
- Height: 6 ft 1 in (1.85 m)
- Position: Forward

Youth career
- 1999–2001: Dinamo Minsk

Senior career*
Years	Team	Apps	(Gls)
1999–2001	Dinamo-Yuni Minsk	27	(17)
2000	→ Dinamo-2 Minsk	10	(3)
2001–2005	Dinamo Minsk	53	(24)
2006–2007	Naftan Novopolotsk	24	(3)
2007–2008	Kaisar	21	(7)
2008	Banants	4	(2)
2008	Savit Mogilev	8	(2)

International career
2002–2004	Belarus U21	11	(3)
2003	Belarus	2	(1)
- * Club domestic league appearances and goals

Maksim Tsyhalka (Belarusian: Максім Цыгалка, Russian: Максим Цыгалко, romanized: Maksim Tsygalko; often spelt Maxim Tsigalko; 27 May 1983 – 25 December 2020) was a Belarusian football player who played as a striker.

Tsyhalka played for several teams in Belarus, Armenia and Kazakhstan, most notably for Dinamo Minsk where he won the Belarusian Premier League and Belarusian Cup and was capped twice for the Belarus national team, scoring one goal. He ended his professional career early, at the age of 26, in 2010 following a knee injury.

Tsyhalka became known worldwide after featuring in the Championship Manager video game series with exaggerated attacking attributes in the 2001–02 version.

Tsyhalka died, aged 37, on 25 December 2020.

== Early life ==
Tsyhalka, alongside his twin brother Yury, was born in Minsk, Belarusian SSR, Soviet Union on 27 May 1983.

== Club career ==
Tsyhalka began his career with FC Dinamo-Juni Minsk – a youth side for Dinamo Minsk – in 1999. He joined Dinamo Minsk's first team in 2001, aged 18, and would go on to score 28 goals in 65 appearances. While at Dinamo, Tsyhalka played alongside his twin brother Yury and the club won the 2002–03 Belarusian Cup and the 2004 Belarusian Premier League.

While playing for Dinamo, Tsyhalka had a trial at Portuguese club Marítimo and was due to be offered a contract. However, he tore his cruciate ligaments during one of the training sessions and returned home to Minsk. The injury would plague him for the rest of his career and after retiring from football.

Tsyhalka joined Naftan Novopolotsk in 2006 before moving to Kazakhstan with Kaisar in 2007. The following year, he played briefly for Banants in Armenia before ending his career with Savit Mogilev in Belarus. He was never able to fully recover from his knee injury which forced him to retire in 2010, aged 26.

== International career ==
Tsyhalka was capped twice for the Belarus national team in April 2003, playing alongside his brother Yury in both matches. He made his debut on 2 April, scoring the opening goal in a 2–2 draw with Uzbekistan at the Dinamo Stadium in Minsk. His final appearance as a substitute came on 30 April in a 2–1 win against Uzbekistan at the Pakhtakor Central Stadium in Tashkent.

== In popular culture ==
Tsyhalka and, to a lesser extent, his brother Yury both received attention after they were featured in the Championship Manager video game series by Sports Interactive. In Championship Manager: Season 01/02, Tsyhalka (spelt "Maxim Tsigalko" in the game) was given significantly higher attacking attributes and potential than his real-life career reflected, making his in-game persona among the most effective strikers available to players. He became a notable figure among fans of the series, with some describing him as a cult figure within the game's community.

== After football ==
Tsyhalka attempted to continue working in football after retiring from playing but was unsuccessful. He pursued construction work to support his family but this was limited due to his knee injury.

== Death ==
Tsyhalka died on 25 December 2020 at the age of 37.
