= Lists of European football transfers =

This is a lists of European football transfers.

== Albania ==
- Summer: 2008
- 2010
- 2011
- 2013
- 2015
- Winter: 2009–10
- 2015–16

== Armenia ==
- Summer: 2019
- 2020
- 2021
- 2022
- 2023
- 2024
- 2025
- 2026
- Winter: 2019–20
- 2020–21
- 2021–22
- 2022–23
- 2023–24
- 2024–25
- 2025–26

== Austria ==
=== Summer ===
- 2010s: 2016
- 2017
- 2018
- 2019
- 2020s: 2020
- 2021
- 2022
- 2023
- 2024
- 2025
- 2026

=== Winter ===
- 2010s: 2016–17
- 2017–18
- 2018–19
- 2019–20
- 2020s: 2020–21
- 2021–22
- 2022–23
- 2023–24
- 2024–25
- 2025–26

== Azerbaijan ==
=== Summer ===
- 2010s: 2010
- 2011
- 2012
- 2013
- 2014
- 2015
- 2016
- 2017
- 2018
- 2019
- 2020s: 2020
- 2021
- 2022
- 2023
- 2024
- 2025
- 2026

=== Winter ===
- 2010s: 2010
- 2011
- 2012
- 2013
- 2014
- 2014–15
- 2015–16
- 2016–17
- 2017–18
- 2018–19
- 2019–20
- 2020s: 2021–22
- 2022–23
- 2023–24
- 2024–25
- 2025–26

== Belgium ==
=== Summer ===
- 2000s: 2008
- 2009
- 2010s: 2010
- 2011
- 2012
- 2013
- 2014
- 2015
- 2016
- 2017
- 2018
- 2019
- 2020s: 2020
- 2021
- 2022
- 2023
- 2025
- 2026

=== Winter ===
- 2000s: 2008–09
- 2009–10
- 2010s: 2010–11
- 2011–12
- 2012–13
- 2013–14
- 2014–15
- 2015–16
- 2016–17
- 2017–18
- 2018–19
- 2019–20
- 2020s: 2020–21
- 2021–22
- 2022–23
- 2023–24
- 2024–25
- 2025–26

== Bosnia and Herzegovina ==
- Summer: 2012
- 2013
- Winter: 2012–13
- 2013–14

== Bulgaria ==
=== Summer ===
- 2000s: 2008
- 2009
- 2010s: 2010
- 2011
- 2012
- 2013
- 2014
- 2015
- 2016
- 2017
- 2018
- 2019
- 2020s: 2020
- 2021
- 2022
- 2023
- 2024
- 2025
- 2026

=== Winter ===
- 2000s: 2008–09
- 2009–10
- 2010s: 2010–11
- 2011–12
- 2012–13
- 2013–14
- 2014–15
- 2015–16
- 2016–17
- 2017–18
- 2018–19
- 2019–20
- 2020s: 2020–21
- 2021–22
- 2022–23
- 2023–24
- 2024–25
- 2025–26

== Croatia ==
- Summer: 2009
- 2010
- 2014
- 2015
- 2016
- 2017
- 2018
- Winter: 2008–09
- 2009–10
- 2022–23
- 2023–24
- 2024–25

== Cyprus ==
=== Summer ===
- 2000s: 2008
- 2009
- 2010s: 2010
- 2011
- 2012
- 2013
- 2014
- 2015
- 2016
- 2017
- 2018
- 2019

=== Winter ===
- 2000s: 2008–09
- 2009–10
- 2010s: 2010–11
- 2011–12
- 2012–13
- 2013–14
- 2014–15
- 2015–16
- 2016–17
- 2017–18
- 2018–19
- 2019–20
- 2020s: 2022–23

== Denmark ==
- Summer: 2008
- 2009
- 2010
- 2015
- 2016
- 2017
- 2018
- 2021
- 2022
- 2024
- 2025
- Winter: 2008–09
- 2009–10
- 2010–11
- 2015–16
- 2020–21
- 2021–22
- 2022–23
- 2023–24
- 2024–25
- 2025–26

== England ==
=== Summer ===
- 2000s: 2002
- 2003
- 2004
- 2005
- 2006
- 2007
- 2008
- 2009
- 2010s: 2010
- 2011
- 2012
- 2013
- 2014
- 2015
- 2016
- 2017
- 2018
- 2019
- 2020s: 2020
- 2021
- 2022
- 2023
- 2024
- 2025
- 2026

=== Winter ===
- 2000s: 2002–03
- 2003–04
- 2004–05
- 2005–06
- 2006–07
- 2007–08
- 2008–09
- 2009–10
- 2010s: 2010–11
- 2011–12
- 2012–13
- 2013–14
- 2014–15
- 2015–16
- 2016–17
- 2017–18
- 2018–19
- 2019–20
- 2020s: 2020–21
- 2021–22
- 2022–23
- 2023–24
- 2024–25
- 2025–26

=== Women ===
- Summer: 2021
- 2022
- 2023
- 2024
- 2025
- 2026
- Winter: 2021–22
- 2022–23
- 2023–24
- 2024–25
- 2025–26

== Estonia ==
=== Summer ===
- 2010s: 2013
- 2014
- 2015
- 2018
- 2019
- 2020s: 2020
- 2022
- 2024

=== Winter ===
- 2010s: 2012–13
- 2013–14
- 2014–15
- 2015–16
- 2017–18
- 2018–19
- 2019–20
- 2020s: 2020–21
- 2021–22
- 2022–23
- 2024–25

=== Other ===
- Summer 2009
- Winter 2009–10

== Finland ==
- Summer: 2014
- 2015
- 2016
- 2024
- Winter: 2014–15
- 2023–24
- 2024–25

== France ==
=== Summer ===
- 2010s: 2010
- 2011
- 2012
- 2013
- 2014
- 2015
- 2016
- 2017
- 2018
- 2019
- 2020s: 2020
- 2021
- 2022
- 2023
- 2024
- 2025

=== Winter ===
- 2010s: 2010
- 2011
- 2012
- 2015–16
- 2016–17
- 2019–20
- 2020s: 2020–21
- 2021–22
- 2022–23
- 2023–24
- 2024–25
- 2025–26

=== Other ===
- 2001
- 2008
- Summer 2009
- Summer 2015 (women)

== Germany ==
=== Summer ===
- 2000s: 2007
- 2008
- 2009
- 2010s: 2010
- 2011
- 2012
- 2013
- 2014
- 2015
- 2016
- 2017
- 2018
- 2019
- 2020s: 2020
- 2021
- 2022
- 2023
- 2024
- 2025
- 2026

=== Winter ===
- 2000s: 2007–08
- 2008–09
- 2009–10
- 2010s: 2010–11
- 2011–12
- 2012–13
- 2013–14
- 2014–15
- 2015–16
- 2016–17
- 2017–18
- 2018–19
- 2019–20
- 2020s: 2020–21
- 2021–22
- 2022–23
- 2023–24
- 2024–25
- 2025–26

== Greece ==
=== Summer ===
- 2000s: 2008
- 2009
- 2010s: 2010
- 2011
- 2012
- 2013
- 2014
- 2015
- 2016
- 2017
- 2018
- 2019
- 2020s: 2021
- 2022
- 2024
- 2025

=== Winter ===
- 2010s: 2016–17
- 2017–18
- 2018–19
- 2019–20
- 2020s: 2021–22
- 2022–23
- 2024–25

== Hungary ==
=== Summer ===
- 2010s: 2010
- 2011
- 2012
- 2013
- 2014
- 2015
- 2016
- 2017
- 2018
- 2020s: 2022
- 2024
- 2025

=== Winter ===
- 2010s: 2011–12
- 2012–13
- 2013–14
- 2017–18
- 2018–19
- 2020s: 2022–23
- 2023–24
- 2024–25
- 2025–26

=== Other ===
- 2007–08
- Winter 2009–10

== Italy ==
=== Summer ===
- 2000–2001: 2000 (co-ownership)
- 2001 (co-ownership)
- 2006–2007: 2006 (July)
- 2006 (August)
- 2006 (co-ownership)
- 2007
- 2007 (co-ownership)
- 2008–2009: 2008 (July)
- 2008 (August)
- 2008 (co-ownership)
- 2009 (July)
- 2009 (August)
- 2009 (co-ownership)
- 2010–2011: 2010 (July)
- 2010 (August)
- 2010 (co-ownership)
- 2011 (June)
- 2011 (July)
- 2011 (August)
- 2011 (co-ownership)
- 2012–2013: 2012 (July)
- 2012 (August)
- 2012 (co-ownership)
- 2013 (July)
- 2013 (August)
- 2013 (co-ownership)
- 2014–2019: 2014
- 2011 (co-ownership)
- 2015
- 2016
- 2017
- 2018
- 2019
- 2020–2026: 2020
- 2021
- 2022
- 2023
- 2024
- 2025
- 2026

=== Winter ===
- 2000s: 2006–07
- 2007–08
- 2008–09
- 2009–10
- 2010s: 2010–11
- 2011–12
- 2012–13
- 2013–14
- 2014–15
- 2015–16
- 2016–17
- 2017–18
- 2018–19
- 2019–20
- 2020s: 2020–21
- 2021–22
- 2022–23
- 2023–24
- 2024–25
- 2025–26

== Latvia ==
=== Summer ===
- 2010s: 2010
- 2011
- 2012
- 2013
- 2014
- 2015
- 2016
- 2017
- 2018
- 2019
- 2020s: 2022
- 2023
- 2024
- 2025
- 2026

=== Winter ===
- 2010s: 2010–11
- 2011–12
- 2012–13
- 2013–14
- 2014–15
- 2015–16
- 2016–17
- 2017–18
- 2018–19
- 2019–20
- 2020s: 2020–21
- 2021–22
- 2022–23
- 2023–24
- 2024–25
- 2025–26

=== Other ===
- Summer 2007
- Winter 2009–10

== Lithuania ==
- Summer: 2017
- 2026
- Winter: 2016–17
- 2017–18
- 2018–19
- 2022–23
- 2024–25

== Malta ==
- Summer: 2008
- 2009
- 2010
- 2011
- 2012
- 2013
- 2014
- 2015
- 2018
- Winter: 2008–09
- 2009–10
- 2010–11
- 2012–13
- 2018–19
- 2022–23

== Netherlands ==
=== Summer ===
- 2000s: 2008
- 2009
- 2010s: 2010
- 2011
- 2012
- 2013
- 2014
- 2015
- 2016
- 2017
- 2018
- 2019
- 2020s: 2020
- 2021
- 2022
- 2023
- 2024
- 2025
- 2026

=== Winter ===
- 2000s: 2008–09
- 2009–10
- 2010s: 2010–11
- 2011–12
- 2012–13
- 2013–14
- 2015–16
- 2017–18
- 2018–19
- 2019–20
- 2020s: 2020–21
- 2021–22
- 2022–23
- 2023–24
- 2024–25
- 2025–26

== Norway ==
=== Summer ===
- 2010s: 2012
- 2013
- 2014
- 2015
- 2016
- 2017
- 2018
- 2019
- 2020s: 2020
- 2021
- 2022
- 2023
- 2024
- 2025
- 2026

=== Winter ===
- 2010s: 2011–12
- 2012–13
- 2013–14
- 2014–15
- 2015–16
- 2016–17
- 2017–18
- 2018–19
- 2019–20
- 2020s: 2020–21
- 2021–22
- 2022–23
- 2023–24
- 2024–25
- 2025–26

== Poland ==
- Summer:2016
- 2017
- 2018
- 2024
- 2025
- Winter: 2016–17
- 2017–18
- 2022–23
- 2023–24
- 2024–25
- 2025–26

== Portugal ==
=== Summer ===
- 2010s: 2010
- 2011
- 2012
- 2013
- 2014
- 2015
- 2016
- 2017
- 2020s: 2021
- 2022
- 2023
- 2025

=== Winter ===
- 2010s: 2010–11
- 2011–12
- 2012–13
- 2013–14
- 2014–15
- 2015–16
- 2016–17
- 2018–19
- 2020s: 2020–21
- 2021–22
- 2022–23
- 2023–24
- 2024–25

=== Other ===
- Summer 2009
- Winter 2009–10

== Romania ==
=== Summer ===
- 2010s: 2011
- 2015
- 2016
- 2017
- 2018
- 2019
- 2020s: 2020
- 2021
- 2022
- 2026

=== Winter ===
- 2010s: 2011–12
- 2016–17
- 2017–18
- 2018–19
- 2019–20
- 2020s: 2020–21
- 2021–22
- 2022–23
- 2023–24
- 2024–25
- 2025–26

=== Other ===
- 2007–08
- 2008–09
- 2009–10

== Russia ==
=== Summer ===
- 2010s: 2010
- 2011
- 2012
- 2013
- 2014
- 2015
- 2016
- 2017
- 2018
- 2019
- 2020s: 2020
- 2021
- 2022
- 2023
- 2024
- 2025
- 2026

=== Winter ===
- 2010s: 2010–11
- 2011–12
- 2012–13
- 2014–15
- 2015–16
- 2016–17
- 2017–18
- 2018–19
- 2019–20
- 2020s: 2020–21
- 2021–22
- 2022–23
- 2023–24
- 2024–25
- 2025–26

=== Other ===
- Summer 2008
- Summer 2009
- Winter 2009–10

== Scotland ==
=== Summer ===
- 2010s: 2011
- 2012
- 2013
- 2014
- 2015
- 2016
- 2017
- 2018
- 2019
- 2020s: 2020
- 2021
- 2022
- 2023
- 2024
- 2025
- 2026

=== Winter ===
- 2010s: 2011–12
- 2012–13
- 2013–14
- 2014–15
- 2015–16
- 2016–17
- 2017–18
- 2018–19
- 2019–20
- 2020s: 2020–21
- 2021–22
- 2022–23
- 2023–24
- 2024–25
- 2025–26

=== Other ===
- 2007–08
- 2008–09
- 2009–10
- 2010–11

== Serbia ==
- Summer: 2009
- 2010
- 2011
- 2012
- 2013
- 2014
- 2015
- 2016
- 2017
- 2018
- 2019
- Winter: 2009–10
- 2010–11
- 2011–12
- 2012–13
- 2013–14
- 2014–15
- 2015–16
- 2016–17
- 2017–18
- 2018–19
- 2019–20
- 2022–23

== Slovakia ==
=== Summer ===
- 2010s: 2012
- 2013
- 2014
- 2015
- 2016
- 2017
- 2018
- 2019
- 2020s: 2020
- 2021
- 2022
- 2023
- 2024
- 2025
- 2026

=== Winter ===
- 2010s: 2011–12
- 2012–13
- 2013–14
- 2014–15
- 2015–16
- 2016–17
- 2017–18
- 2018–19
- 2019–20
- 2020s: 2020–21
- 2021–22
- 2022–23
- 2023–24
- 2024–25
- 2025–26

== Slovenia ==
- Summer: 2009
- 2016
- 2025
- Winter: 2016–17
- 2021–22
- 2022–23
- 2023–24
- 2024–25
- 2025–26

== Spain ==
=== Summer ===
- 2000s: 2008
- 2009
- 2010s: 2010
- 2011
- 2012
- 2013
- 2014
- 2015
- 2016
- 2017
- 2018
- 2019
- 2020s: 2020
- 2021
- 2022
- 2023
- 2024
- 2025

=== Winter ===
- 2000s: 2008–09
- 2009–10
- 2010s: 2010–11
- 2011–12
- 2012–13
- 2013–14
- 2014–15
- 2015–16
- 2016–17
- 2017–18
- 2018–19
- 2019–20
- 2020s: 2020–21
- 2021–22
- 2022–23
- 2023–24
- 2024–25

=== Other ===
- 2000s: 2005–06
- 2006–07
- Segunda: 2005–06
- 2006–07
- Summer 2025
- Women: Summer 2014
- Summer 2015

== Sweden ==
=== Summer ===
- 2010s: 2010
- 2011
- 2012
- 2013
- 2014
- 2015
- 2016
- 2017
- 2020s: 2020
- 2021
- 2022
- 2023
- 2024
- 2025

=== Winter ===
- 2000s: 2007–08
- 2009–10
- 2010s: 2010–11
- 2011–12
- 2012–13
- 2013–14
- 2014–15
- 2015–16
- 2016–17
- 2017–18
- 2019–20
- 2020s: 2020–21
- 2021–22
- 2022–23
- 2023–24
- 2024–25
- 2025–26

== Switzerland ==
=== Summer ===
- 2010s: 2015
- 2016
- 2017
- 2018
- 2020s: 2020
- 2021
- 2022
- 2023
- 2024
- 2025

=== Winter ===
- 2010s: 2015–16
- 2017–18
- 2018–19
- 2019–20
- 2020s: 2020–21
- 2021–22
- 2022–23
- 2023–24
- 2024–25
- 2025–26

== Turkey ==
=== Summer ===
- 2010s: 2010
- 2011
- 2013
- 2014
- 2015
- 2016
- 2017
- 2019
- 2020s: 2021
- 2022
- 2023
- 2024
- 2025

=== Winter ===
- 2010s: 2015–16
- 2020s: 2020–21
- 2021–22
- 2022–23
- 2023–24
- 2024–25
- 2025–26

=== Other ===
- 2006–07
- 2007–08
- 2008–09
- Summer 2009

== Ukraine ==
=== Summer ===
- 2000s: 2008
- 2009
- 2010s: 2010
- 2016
- 2017
- 2018
- 2019
- 2020s: 2020
- 2021
- 2022
- 2023
- 2024
- 2025
- 2026

=== Winter ===
- 2000s: 2008–09
- 2010s: 2010–11
- 2011–12
- 2014–15
- 2016–17
- 2017–18
- 2018–19
- 2019–20
- 2020s: 2020–21
- 2021–22
- 2022–23
- 2023–24
- 2024–25
- 2025–26
