= List of Swiss football transfers winter 2017–18 =

This is a list of Swiss football transfers for the 2017–18 winter transfer window by club. Only transfers of clubs in the Swiss Super League are included.

== Swiss Super League ==
=== Basel ===
In:

No.	Pos.	Nation	Player
--	FW	SVN	Andraž Šporar (loan return from (Germany) Arminia Bielefeld)
--	GK	SRB	Đorđe Nikolić (loan return from Schaffhausen)
6	MF	SUI	Fabian Frei (from (Germany) Mainz 05)
10	MF	SUI	Samuele Campo (from Lausanne-Sport)
14	MF	SUI	Valentin Stocker (from (Germany) Hertha BSC)
22	FW	SUI	Albian Ajeti (from St. Gallen)
40	GK	ANG	Signori António (free agent)

Out:

No.	Pos.	Nation	Player
--	FW	SVN	Andraž Šporar (to (Slovakia) Slovan Bratislava)
--	GK	SRB	Đorđe Nikolić (on loan to Thun)
4	DF	EGY	Omar Gaber (on loan to (United States) Los Angeles)
11	MF	SUI	Renato Steffen (to (Germany) VfL Wolfsburg)
15	MF	SWE	Alexander Fransson (on loan to Lausanne-Sport)
30	FW	SUI	Cedric Itten (on loan to St. Gallen)
31	MF	SUI	Dominik Schmid (on loan to Lausanne-Sport)
36	DF	SUI	Manuel Akanji (to (Germany) Borussia Dortmund)

=== Grasshoppers ===
In:

No.	Pos.	Nation	Player
3	DF	SUI	Jean-Pierre Rhyner (loan return from Schaffhausen)
7	MF	ALB	Gjelbrim Taipi (from St. Gallen)
11	MF	BIH	Rifet Kapić (from (Slovenia) Gorica)
24	MF	SUI	Bujar Lika (from Schaffhausen)

Out:

No.	Pos.	Nation	Player
7	MF	ISL	Rúnar Már Sigurjónsson (on loan to St. Gallen)
11	MF	ALB	Mërgim Brahimi (to (Greece) Panionios)
22	FW	COD	Ridge Munsy (on loan to (Germany) Erzgebirge Aue)

=== Lausanne-Sport ===
In:

No.	Pos.	Nation	Player
13	FW	SUI	Simone Rapp (from Thun)
17	MF	SWE	Alexander Fransson (on loan from Basel)
21	MF	FRA	Enzo (from (Spain) Deportivo Alavés)
31	MF	SUI	Dominik Schmid (on loan from Basel)

Out:

No.	Pos.	Nation	Player
11	MF	SUI	Samuele Campo (to Basel)
37	FW	PAN	Gabriel Torres (to (Chile) Huachipato)

=== Lugano ===
In:

No.	Pos.	Nation	Player
--	DF	SUI	Jetmir Krasniqi (from Chiasso)

Out:

No.	Pos.	Nation	Player
6	DF	CRO	Dominik Kovačić (to (Moldova) Sheriff Tiraspol)
9	FW	CRO	Antonini Čulina (to (Poland) Cracovia)
20	MF	SRB	Radomir Milosavljević (to (Greece) AEL)

=== Luzern ===
In:

No.	Pos.	Nation	Player
3	DF	SRB	Lazar Ćirković (from (Serbia) Partizan)

Out:

No.	Pos.	Nation	Player
3	DF	SUI	Reto Ziegler (to (United States) Dallas)

=== Sion ===
In:

No.	Pos.	Nation	Player
14	MF	SUI	Anto Grgić (on loan from (Germany) VfB Stuttgart)
17	FW	PER	Alexander Succar (on loan from (Peru) Sporting Cristal)

Out:

No.	Pos.	Nation	Player
12	MF	SUI	Gregory Karlen (on loan to Thun)
23	DF	SUI	Ahmet Özcan (to (Spain) Linense)
28	MF	SUI	Nikola Milosavljevic (on loan to Winterthur)

=== St. Gallen ===
In:

No.	Pos.	Nation	Player
8	MF	ISL	Rúnar Már Sigurjónsson (on loan from Grasshoppers)
--	FW	SUI	Cedric Itten (on loan from Basel)

Out:

No.	Pos.	Nation	Player
8	MF	ALB	Gjelbrim Taipi (to Grasshoppers)
21	DF	GER	Kofi Schulz (to Winterthur)
27	FW	SUI	Albian Ajeti (to Basel)

=== Thun ===
In:

No.	Pos.	Nation	Player
8	MF	SUI	Gregory Karlen (on loan from Sion)
13	GK	SRB	Đorđe Nikolić (on loan from Basel)
--	DF	SUI	Sven Joss (from Young Boys)

Out:

No.	Pos.	Nation	Player
13	FW	SUI	Simone Rapp (to Lausanne-Sport)

=== Young Boys ===
In:

No.	Pos.	Nation	Player

Out:

No.	Pos.	Nation	Player
39	DF	SUI	Sven Joss (to Thun)

=== Zürich ===
In:

No.	Pos.	Nation	Player

Out:

No.	Pos.	Nation	Player
