= List of Russian football transfers summer 2008 =

This is a list of Russian football transfers in the summer transfer window 2008 by club. Only transfers of the 2008 Russian Premier League are included.

== Premier League ==
=== FC Zenit St. Petersburg ===
In: Note: Flags indicate national team as defined under FIFA eligibility rules; some limited exceptions apply. Players may hold more than one non-FIFA nationality.

| No. | Pos. | Nation | Player |
|---|---|---|---|
| 28 | DF | (France) FRA | Sébastien Puygrenier (from AS Nancy) |
| 19 | MF | (Portugal) POR | Danny (from FC Dynamo Moscow) |

Out: Note: Flags indicate national team as defined under FIFA eligibility rules; some limited exceptions apply. Players may hold more than one non-FIFA nationality.

| No. | Pos. | Nation | Player |

=== FC Spartak Moscow ===
In: Note: Flags indicate national team as defined under FIFA eligibility rules; some limited exceptions apply. Players may hold more than one non-FIFA nationality.

| No. | Pos. | Nation | Player |

Out: Note: Flags indicate national team as defined under FIFA eligibility rules; some limited exceptions apply. Players may hold more than one non-FIFA nationality.

| No. | Pos. | Nation | Player |
|---|---|---|---|
| 25 | MF | (Ukraine) UKR | Maksym Kalynychenko (to FC Dnipro Dnipropetrovsk) |
| 9 | MF | (Russia) RUS | Egor Titov (to FC Khimki) |
| 14 | DF | (Argentina) ARG | Clemente Rodríguez (on loan to San Lorenzo de Almagro) |
| 6 | DF | (Romania) ROU | Florin Costin Şoava (to FC Khimki) |
| 36 | DF | (Russia) RUS | Fyodor Kudryashov (to FC Khimki) |
| 34 | MF | (Russia) RUS | Renat Sabitov (to FC Khimki) |
| 55 | MF | (Russia) RUS | Oleg Dineev (to FC Khimki) |
| 17 | FW | (Russia) RUS | Artem Fomin (released) |

=== PFC CSKA Moscow ===
In: Note: Flags indicate national team as defined under FIFA eligibility rules; some limited exceptions apply. Players may hold more than one non-FIFA nationality.

| No. | Pos. | Nation | Player |

Out: Note: Flags indicate national team as defined under FIFA eligibility rules; some limited exceptions apply. Players may hold more than one non-FIFA nationality.

| No. | Pos. | Nation | Player |

=== FC Moscow ===
In: Note: Flags indicate national team as defined under FIFA eligibility rules; some limited exceptions apply. Players may hold more than one non-FIFA nationality.

| No. | Pos. | Nation | Player |

Out: Note: Flags indicate national team as defined under FIFA eligibility rules; some limited exceptions apply. Players may hold more than one non-FIFA nationality.

| No. | Pos. | Nation | Player |
|---|---|---|---|
| 9 | MF | (Argentina) ARG | Pablo Barrientos (on loan to San Lorenzo de Almagro) |

=== FC Saturn Moscow Oblast ===
In: Note: Flags indicate national team as defined under FIFA eligibility rules; some limited exceptions apply. Players may hold more than one non-FIFA nationality.

| No. | Pos. | Nation | Player |

Out: Note: Flags indicate national team as defined under FIFA eligibility rules; some limited exceptions apply. Players may hold more than one non-FIFA nationality.

| No. | Pos. | Nation | Player |

=== FC Dynamo Moscow ===
In: Note: Flags indicate national team as defined under FIFA eligibility rules; some limited exceptions apply. Players may hold more than one non-FIFA nationality.

| No. | Pos. | Nation | Player |
|---|---|---|---|
| — | MF | (Australia) AUS | Luke Wilkshire (from FC Twente) |
| 30 | GK | (Russia) RUS | Vladimir Gabulov (from FC Amkar Perm) |

Out: Note: Flags indicate national team as defined under FIFA eligibility rules; some limited exceptions apply. Players may hold more than one non-FIFA nationality.

| No. | Pos. | Nation | Player |
|---|---|---|---|
| 10 | MF | (Portugal) POR | Danny (to FC Zenit St. Petersburg) |
| 41 | MF | (Russia) RUS | Zaurbek Pliev (released) |

=== FC Lokomotiv Moscow ===
In: Note: Flags indicate national team as defined under FIFA eligibility rules; some limited exceptions apply. Players may hold more than one non-FIFA nationality.

| No. | Pos. | Nation | Player |

Out: Note: Flags indicate national team as defined under FIFA eligibility rules; some limited exceptions apply. Players may hold more than one non-FIFA nationality.

| No. | Pos. | Nation | Player |

=== FC Amkar Perm ===
In: Note: Flags indicate national team as defined under FIFA eligibility rules; some limited exceptions apply. Players may hold more than one non-FIFA nationality.

| No. | Pos. | Nation | Player |

Out: Note: Flags indicate national team as defined under FIFA eligibility rules; some limited exceptions apply. Players may hold more than one non-FIFA nationality.

| No. | Pos. | Nation | Player |
|---|---|---|---|
| 26 | FW | (Russia) RUS | Yuri Shestakov (to FC Metallurg Lipetsk) |
| 1 | GK | (Russia) RUS | Vladimir Gabulov (to FC Dynamo Moscow) |
| 31 | DF | (Armenia) ARM | Arthur Stepanyan (to FC Chernomorets Novorossiysk) |
| 77 | MF | (Russia) RUS | Ildar Akhmetzyanov (to FC Sibir Novosibirsk) |
| 89 | MF | (Russia) RUS | Andrey Sekretov (to FC Nizhny Novgorod) |
| 30 | MF | (Russia) RUS | Ilya Boldinsky (to FC Dynamo Saint Petersburg) |

=== FC Khimki ===
In: Note: Flags indicate national team as defined under FIFA eligibility rules; some limited exceptions apply. Players may hold more than one non-FIFA nationality.

| No. | Pos. | Nation | Player |
|---|---|---|---|
| 90 | MF | (Russia) RUS | Egor Titov (from FC Spartak Moscow) |
| 2 | DF | (Romania) ROU | Florin Costin Şoava (from FC Spartak Moscow) |
| 99 | DF | (Russia) RUS | Fyodor Kudryashov (from FC Spartak Moscow) |
| 77 | MF | (Russia) RUS | Renat Sabitov (from FC Spartak Moscow) |
| 55 | MF | (Russia) RUS | Oleg Dineev (from FC Spartak Moscow) |

Out: Note: Flags indicate national team as defined under FIFA eligibility rules; some limited exceptions apply. Players may hold more than one non-FIFA nationality.

| No. | Pos. | Nation | Player |
|---|---|---|---|
| 3 | MF | (Russia) RUS | Yuri Alekseevich Drozdov (to FC Vityaz Podolsk) |
| 33 | FW | (Serbia) SRB | Dragan Mrđa (released) |
| 32 | MF | (Serbia) SRB | Zoran Knežević (released) |
| 8 | MF | (Bosnia and Herzegovina) BIH | Ajdin Maksumić (released) |

=== FC Rubin Kazan ===
In: Note: Flags indicate national team as defined under FIFA eligibility rules; some limited exceptions apply. Players may hold more than one non-FIFA nationality.

| No. | Pos. | Nation | Player |

Out: Note: Flags indicate national team as defined under FIFA eligibility rules; some limited exceptions apply. Players may hold more than one non-FIFA nationality.

| No. | Pos. | Nation | Player |

=== FC Tom Tomsk ===
In: Note: Flags indicate national team as defined under FIFA eligibility rules; some limited exceptions apply. Players may hold more than one non-FIFA nationality.

| No. | Pos. | Nation | Player |

Out: Note: Flags indicate national team as defined under FIFA eligibility rules; some limited exceptions apply. Players may hold more than one non-FIFA nationality.

| No. | Pos. | Nation | Player |

=== PFC Spartak Nalchik ===
In: Note: Flags indicate national team as defined under FIFA eligibility rules; some limited exceptions apply. Players may hold more than one non-FIFA nationality.

| No. | Pos. | Nation | Player |
|---|---|---|---|
| — | MF | (Lithuania) LTU | Darvydas Šernas (on loan from FK Vėtra) |

Out: Note: Flags indicate national team as defined under FIFA eligibility rules; some limited exceptions apply. Players may hold more than one non-FIFA nationality.

| No. | Pos. | Nation | Player |

=== FC Krylia Sovetov Samara ===
In: Note: Flags indicate national team as defined under FIFA eligibility rules; some limited exceptions apply. Players may hold more than one non-FIFA nationality.

| No. | Pos. | Nation | Player |
|---|---|---|---|
| 89 | FW | (Czech Republic) CZE | Jan Koller (from 1. FC Nürnberg) |

Out: Note: Flags indicate national team as defined under FIFA eligibility rules; some limited exceptions apply. Players may hold more than one non-FIFA nationality.

| No. | Pos. | Nation | Player |
|---|---|---|---|
| 4 | DF | (Poland) POL | Krzysztof Łągiewka (to FC Kuban Krasnodar) |
| 19 | MF | (Belarus) BLR | Aleksey Skvernyuk (released) |

=== FC Luch-Energiya Vladivostok ===
In: Note: Flags indicate national team as defined under FIFA eligibility rules; some limited exceptions apply. Players may hold more than one non-FIFA nationality.

| No. | Pos. | Nation | Player |

Out: Note: Flags indicate national team as defined under FIFA eligibility rules; some limited exceptions apply. Players may hold more than one non-FIFA nationality.

| No. | Pos. | Nation | Player |

=== FC Shinnik Yaroslavl ===
In: Note: Flags indicate national team as defined under FIFA eligibility rules; some limited exceptions apply. Players may hold more than one non-FIFA nationality.

| No. | Pos. | Nation | Player |

Out: Note: Flags indicate national team as defined under FIFA eligibility rules; some limited exceptions apply. Players may hold more than one non-FIFA nationality.

| No. | Pos. | Nation | Player |

=== FC Terek Grozny ===
In: Note: Flags indicate national team as defined under FIFA eligibility rules; some limited exceptions apply. Players may hold more than one non-FIFA nationality.

| No. | Pos. | Nation | Player |
|---|---|---|---|
| — | DF | (Russia) RUS | Sergei Bendz (from FC Rostov) |

Out: Note: Flags indicate national team as defined under FIFA eligibility rules; some limited exceptions apply. Players may hold more than one non-FIFA nationality.

| No. | Pos. | Nation | Player |

== See also ==
- Football in post Soviet Russia
