= Sven Joss =

Swiss footballer (born 1994)

Personal information
- Date of birth: 18 July 1994 (age 32)
- Place of birth: Bern, Switzerland
- Height: 1.79 m (5 ft 10 in)
- Position: Defender

Team information
- Current team: FC Konolfingen
- Number: 7

Youth career
- FC Konolfingen
- –2012: Young Boys

Senior career*
Years	Team	Apps	(Gls)
2012–2017	Young Boys U21	68	(4)
2015–2018	Young Boys	11	(0)
2015–2016	→ Thun U21 (loan)	5	(0)
2015–2016	→ Thun (loan)	25	(1)
2018–2021	Thun	39	(1)
2018–2019	Thun U21	2	(0)
2021–	FC Konolfingen	10	(3)
- * Club domestic league appearances and goals as of 23 October 2021

Sven Joss (born 18 July 1994) is a Swiss footballer who plays for FC Konolfingen in the Swiss fifth-tier 2. Liga Interregional.

== Career ==
In July 2015, he joined Thun on loan from Young Boys for one year until the end of the 2015–16 season. This agreement was extended by one year in May 2016. After having made three appearances for Thun in the 2016–17 season, he was recalled after all on 8 August 2016 to replace Florent Hadergjonaj who left he club on the same day.
