= List of Danish football transfers summer 2010 =

This is a list of Danish football transfers for the 2010 summer transfer window. Only moves featuring at least one Danish Superliga club are listed.

The Danish Superliga 2009-10 season ended on May 16, 2010, with the Danish Superliga 2010-11 season starting on July 18, 2010. The summer transfer window opened on 1 July 2010, although a few transfers took place prior to that date; including carry-overs from the winter 2009–10 transfer window. The window closed at midnight on 31 August 2010.

== Transfers ==
Date	Name	Nat	Moving from	Moving to	Fee
2010-02-02^{1}	Christian Gytkjær	DEN	Lyngby	Nordsjælland	Free
2010-04-10^{1}	Mathias Nielsen	DEN	HB Køge	Nordsjælland	Free
2010-04-22^{1}	Atiba Hutchinson	CAN	Copenhagen	(Netherlands) PSV	Free
2010-05-05^{1}	Benjamin Kibebe	SWE	Nordsjælland	(Switzerland) Luzern	Undisclosed
2010-05-06^{1}	Kasper Jensen	DEN	(Germany) SC Paderborn 07	Midtjylland	Free
2010-05-19^{1}	Jesper Jensen	DEN	SønderjyskE	Vejle	Undisclosed
2010-05-20^{1}	Jesper Mikkelsen	DEN	(France) Troyes	Silkeborg	Free
2010-05-25^{1}	Mads Pedersen	DEN	SønderjyskE	FCV	Undisclosed
2010-05-25^{1}	Mark Leth Pedersen	DEN	Brøndby	FCV	Free
2010-05-26^{1}	Peter Ankersen	DEN	Esbjerg	Vejle	Free
2010-06-02^{1}	Henrik Ipsen	DEN	SønderjyskE	Vejle	Free
2009-06-03^{1}	Martin Raška	CZE	Midtjylland	(Slovakia) Trnava	Free
2009-06-07^{1}	Arnór Smárason	ISL	(Netherlands) Heerenveen	Esbjerg	Free
2010-07-01	Abbas Hassan	SWE	AaB	(Sweden) Elfsborg	Loan return
2010-07-01	Morten Nordstrand	DEN	(Netherlands) Groningen	Copenhagen	Loan return
2010-07-01	Emil Ousager	DEN	Næsby	OB	Loan return
2010-07-01	Gunnar Thorvaldsson	ISL	(England) Reading	Esbjerg	Loan return
2010-07-01	Ken Fagerberg	SWE	(Sweden) Örgryte	Midtjylland	Loan return
2010-07-01	Stefan Gislason	ISL	(Norway) Viking	Brøndby	Loan return
2010-07-01	Pierre Kanstrup	DEN	Lyngby	Brøndby	Loan return
2010-07-01	Søren Jensen	DEN	Randers	(Norway) Odd Grenland	Loan return

== Notes ==
- ^1 Player will officially join his new club on 1 July 2010.
