= List of Hungarian football transfers summer 2016 =

This is a list of Hungarian football transfers in the summer transfer window 2016 by club. Only transfers in Nemzeti Bajnokság I, and Nemzeti Bajnokság II are included.

== Nemzeti Bajnokság I ==
=== Budapest Honvéd ===
In:

No.	Pos.	Nation	Player
—	GK	(Hungary) HUN	Dávid Gróf (from Csákvár)
—	DF	(Hungary) HUN	Ádám Hajdú (from MTK Budapest)
—	DF	(Hungary) HUN	András Márton (from Honvéd II)
—	FW	(Hungary) HUN	Dániel Lukács (from Honvéd II)
—	DF	(Romania) ROU	Raul Palmes (from Honvéd II)
—	MF	(Hungary) HUN	Dániel Kovács (from Honvéd II)
—	MF	(Hungary) HUN	Dániel Göblyös (from Honvéd II)
—	FW	(Hungary) HUN	Márk Koszta (from Honvéd U-19)
—	GK	(Hungary) HUN	Dániel Vajda (from Sz'miklós)
—	FW	(Hungary) HUN	Gergely Bobál (loan return from (Germany) Wolfsburg II)

Out:

No.	Pos.	Nation	Player
—	GK	(Hungary) HUN	Szabolcs Kemenes (to Paks)
—	MF	(Hungary) HUN	Mihály Csábi (loan to Kozármisleny)
—	DF	(Serbia) SRB	Aleksandar Ignjatović
—	FW	(Hungary) HUN	László Erdélyi
—	DF	(Romania) ROU	Loránd Szilágyi

=== Debrecen ===
In:

No.	Pos.	Nation	Player
—	MF	(Serbia) SRB	Danilo Sekulić (from (Serbia) Vojvodina)
—	DF	(Hungary) HUN	Viktor Koval (from Dunaújváros)
—	DF	(Hungary) HUN	Tibor Bokros (from Balmazújváros)
—	FW	(Slovakia) SVK	Karol Mészáros (from Puskás)
—	FW	(Netherlands) NED	Geoffrey Castillion (loan return from Puskás)
—	FW	(Hungary) HUN	Bence Sós (loan return from Mezőkövesd)
—	DF	(Hungary) HUN	Péter Szilvási (loan return from Mezőkövesd)

Out:

No.	Pos.	Nation	Player
—	MF	(Hungary) HUN	Ádám Bódi (to Videoton)
—	DF	(Hungary) HUN	Pál Lázár (to Diósgyőr)
—	DF	(Hungary) HUN	Péter Máté (to Nyíregyháza)
—	FW	(Senegal) SEN	Ibrahima Sidibe (to (Belgium) Hasselt)
—	FW	(Hungary) HUN	Bence Sós (loan to Mezőkövesd)
—	FW	(France) FRA	Adamo Coulibaly

== See also ==
- 2016–17 Nemzeti Bajnokság I
- 2016–17 Nemzeti Bajnokság II
- 2016–17 Nemzeti Bajnokság III
- 2016–17 Magyar Kupa
