= List of Estonian football transfers summer 2019 =

This is a list of Estonian football transfers in the summer transfer window 2019 by club. Only transfers related to Meistriliiga clubs are included.

This transfer window was open from 1 July to 31 July.

== Meistriliiga ==
=== Nõmme Kalju ===
In:

No.	Pos.	Nation	Player
8	MF	(Ukraine) UKR	Vladyslav Khomutov (from (Slovakia) FC ViOn Zlaté Moravce)
99	FW	(New Zealand) NZL	Max Mata (on loan from (Switzerland) Grasshopper Club Zürich)

Out:

No.	Pos.	Nation	Player
8	MF	(Moldova) MDA	Eugen Zasavițchi (contract terminated)
99	FW	(Chile) CHI	Héctor Núñez (contract terminated)
24	FW	(Estonia) EST	Alex Matthias Tamm (on loan to (Switzerland) Grasshopper Club Zürich)

=== FCI Levadia ===
In:

No.	Pos.	Nation	Player
20	FW	(Colombia) COL	Erik Moreno (from (Portugal) U.D. Oliveirense)
99	FW	(Russia) RUS	Evgeny Kabaev (from (Russia) FC SKA-Khabarovsk)

Out:

No.	Pos.	Nation	Player
9	FW	(Ukraine) UKR	Yevhen Budnik

=== Flora Tallinn ===
In:

No.	Pos.	Nation	Player
32	GK	(Estonia) EST	Matvei Igonen (on loan from (Norway) Lillestrøm)
3	DF	(Estonia) EST	Enar Jääger (free agent)
71	FW	(Estonia) EST	Mark Anders Lepik (loan return from (Switzerland) FC Winterthur)
49	FW	(Georgia (country)) GEO	Zakaria Beglarishvili (loan return from (Hungary) Budapest Honvéd FC)
11	FW	(Estonia) EST	Rauno Sappinen (loan return from (Netherlands) FC Den Bosch)

Out:

No.	Pos.	Nation	Player
1	GK	(Estonia) EST	Ingmar Krister Paplavskis (loan to Viljandi JK Tulevik)
6	MF	(Estonia) EST	German Šlein (loan to Viljandi JK Tulevik)
70	FW	(Estonia) EST	Mattias Männilaan (loan to (Germany) Holstein Kiel)
43	DF	(Estonia) EST	Markkus Seppik (loan to (Germany) Holstein Kiel)
38	FW	(Estonia) EST	Aleksandr Šapovalov (to (Germany) SC Freiburg)

=== Narva Trans ===
In:

No.	Pos.	Nation	Player
—	MF	(Estonia) EST	German Šlein (loan from Flora Tallinn)
—	MF	(Ivory Coast) CIV	Michael Gnolou (free agent)

Out:

No.	Pos.	Nation	Player
4	DF	(Senegal) SEN	Abdoulaye Diallo (contract terminated)
14	DF	(Russia) RUS	Dmitri Proshin (retired)
—	MF	(Estonia) EST	German Šlein (contract terminated)
—	MF	(Ivory Coast) CIV	Michael Gnolou (contract terminated)

=== Paide Linnameeskond ===
In:

No.	Pos.	Nation	Player
17	MF	(Brazil) BRA	Bruno Souza Caprioli (from (Brazil) Ituano FC)
20	DF	(Estonia) EST	Edgar Tur (loan return from (Bulgaria) POFC Botev Vratsa)
19	FW	(Estonia) EST	Siim Luts (from (Czech Republic) FK Teplice)
24	GK	(Estonia) EST	Marten Ritson (free agent)

Out:

No.	Pos.	Nation	Player
45	FW	(Estonia) EST	Andre Järva (unknown)
13	MF	(Estonia) EST	Vladislav Zanfirov (loan return to FCI Levadia)
—	GK	(Estonia) EST	Rene Merilo (loan to Kohtla-Järve JK Järve)

=== Tartu Tammeka ===
In:

No.	Pos.	Nation	Player
19	FW	(Estonia) EST	Tristan Koskor (free agent)

Out:

No.	Pos.	Nation	Player

=== Viljandi Tulevik ===
In:

No.	Pos.	Nation	Player
7	FW	(Benin) BEN	Romeo Da-Costa (from (Benin) AS Cotonou)
10	FW	(Nigeria) NGA	David Onyeanula (from (Nigeria) Jigawa Golden Stars F.C.)
3	DF	(Nigeria) NGA	Babatunde Ridwan (from (Nigeria) Olisa FC)
—	GK	(Estonia) EST	Ingmar Krister Paplavskis (on loan from FC Flora)
—	MF	(Estonia) EST	German Šlein (on loan from FC Flora)
70	DF	(Estonia) EST	Vladislav Zanfirov (on loan from FCI Levadia)

Out:

No.	Pos.	Nation	Player
—	FW	(Estonia) EST	Rasmus Alles (to Vändra JK Vaprus)
—	FW	(Estonia) EST	Kristen Kähr (to Vändra JK Vaprus)

=== Tallinna Kalev ===
In:

No.	Pos.	Nation	Player
—	MF	(Benin) BEN	Watson Fabricio (free agent)

Out:

No.	Pos.	Nation	Player

=== Kuressaare ===
In:

No.	Pos.	Nation	Player
19	MF	(Estonia) EST	Nikita Komissarov (on loan from FC Flora U21)
—	FW	(Estonia) EST	Joonas Soomre (from FC Flora U21)
33	FW	(Estonia) EST	Mario Stern (free agent)

Out:

No.	Pos.	Nation	Player

=== Maardu Linnameeskond ===
In:

No.	Pos.	Nation	Player
6	FW	(Nigeria) NGA	Jasper Uwaegbulam (free agent)
10	MF	(Lithuania) LTU	Domantas Antanavičius (from (Lithuania) FC Stumbras)

Out:

No.	Pos.	Nation	Player
