= Yuri Shestakov =

Russian footballer

Personal information
- Full name: Yuri Mikhailovich Shestakov
- Date of birth: 21 June 1985 (age 41)
- Place of birth: Perm, Russian SFSR
- Height: 1.85 m (6 ft 1 in)
- Position: Forward

Youth career
- Football SDYuSShOR Perm

Senior career*
Years	Team	Apps	(Gls)
2004–2005	FC Amkar Perm	0	(0)
2005	FC Gazovik-Gazprom Izhevsk	27	(5)
2006	FC Amkar Perm	0	(0)
2006	FC SOYUZ-Gazprom Izhevsk	13	(10)
2007	FC Amkar Perm	0	(0)
2007	→ FC Nosta Novotroitsk (loan)	12	(0)
2008	FC Metallurg Lipetsk	11	(2)
2009	FC Nizhny Novgorod	10	(0)
2009	FC SOYUZ-Gazprom Izhevsk	9	(0)
2010	FC Oktan Perm (amateur)		
2011–2012	FC Torpedo Miass (amateur)		
- * Club domestic league appearances and goals

Yuri Mikhailovich Shestakov (Russian: Юрий Михайлович Шестаков; born 21 June 1985) is a former Russian professional football player.

== Club career ==
He made his debut for the senior squad of FC Amkar Perm on 5 March 2006 in a Russian Cup game against FC Saturn Ramenskoye. He also appeared 8 days later in the return leg of the same Cup matchup.

He made his Russian Football National League debut for FC Nosta Novotroitsk on 28 March 2007 in a game against FC Terek Grozny.
