= List of English football transfers winter 2004–05 =

This is a list of English football transfers for the 2004–05 season. Only moves featuring at least one Premier League or First Division club are listed.

The winter transfer window opened on 1 January 2005, although a few transfers took place prior to that date. Players without a club could join one at any time, either during or in between transfer windows. Clubs below Premier League level could also sign players on loan at any time. If need be, clubs could sign a goalkeeper on an emergency loan, if all others were unavailable. Clubs were able to purchase players again in May when the window re-opened.

== January transfers ==
Date	Player	Moving from	Moving to	Fee
1 January 2005	Jean-Alain Boumsong	Rangers	Newcastle United	£8m
3 January 2005	Celestine Babayaro	Chelsea	Newcastle United	Undisclosed
4 January 2005	James Beattie	Southampton	Everton	£6m
4 January 2005	Jamie Redknapp	Tottenham Hotspur	Southampton	free
6 January 2005	Ryan Nelsen	Major League Soccer (D.C. United)	Blackburn Rovers	free
6 January 2005	Jiri Jarosik	CSKA Moscow	Chelsea	Undisclosed
7 January 2005	Emmanuel Eboué	Beveren	Arsenal	£1.5m
10 January 2005	Dean Ashton	Crewe Alexandra	Norwich City	£3m
10 January 2005	Kevin Campbell	Everton	West Bromwich Albion	free
12 January 2005	Fernando Morientes	Real Madrid	Liverpool	£6.3m
14 January 2005	Thomas Gravesen	Everton	Real Madrid	£2.5m
15 January 2005	Kasey Keller	Tottenham Hotspur	Borussia Mönchengladbach	free
17 January 2005	Nigel Quashie	Portsmouth	Southampton	£2.1m
19 January 2005	Robbie Savage	Birmingham City	Blackburn Rovers	£3m
21 January 2005	Scott Carson	Leeds United	Liverpool	£1m
22 January 2005	Bernt Haas	West Bromwich Albion	Bastia	free
25 January 2005	Amady Faye	Portsmouth	Newcastle United	£2m
27 January 2005	Mounir El Hamdaoui	Excelsior Rotterdam	Tottenham Hotspur	Undisclosed
28 January 2005	Mido	AS Roma	Tottenham Hotspur	two-season long loan
28 January 2005	Stéphane Henchoz	Liverpool	Celtic	free
31 January 2005	Nicolas Anelka	Manchester City	Fenerbahçe	£7m
31 January 2005	Eric Djemba-Djemba	Manchester United	Aston Villa	£1.35m
31 January 2005	Mikel Arteta	Real Sociedad	Everton	six-month loan
31 January 2005	Craig Bellamy	Newcastle United	Celtic	six-month loan
31 January 2005	Barry Ferguson	Blackburn Rovers	Rangers	£4.5m
31 January 2005	Olivier Bernard	Newcastle United	Southampton	Undisclosed
31 January 2005	Vincent Candela	AS Roma	Bolton Wanderers	free
31 January 2005	Jermaine Pennant	Arsenal	Birmingham City	six-month loan
31 January 2005	Andy Reid	Nottingham Forest	Tottenham Hotspur	£4m
31 January 2005	Michael Dawson	Nottingham Forest	Tottenham Hotspur	£4m

=== Post-window deals ===
Date	Player	Moving from	Moving to	Fee
17 April 2005	Dwight Yorke	Birmingham City	Sydney FC	free
25 April 2005	Jermaine Pennant	Arsenal	Birmingham City	£3m
