= List of Turkish football transfers winter 2021–22 =

This is a list of Turkish football transfers for the 2021–22 winter transfer window by club. Only transfers of clubs in the Süper Lig are included.

The winter transfer window opened on 1 January 2022, although a few transfers took place prior to that date. The window closed at midnight on 2 February 2022. Players without a club may join one at any time, either during or in between transfer windows.

== Süper Lig ==
=== Adana Demirspor ===
In:

No.	Pos.	Nation	Player

Out:

No.	Pos.	Nation	Player

=== Alanyaspor ===
In:

No.	Pos.	Nation	Player

Out:

No.	Pos.	Nation	Player
—	FW	(Senegal) SEN	Khouma Babacar (loan return to (Italy) Sassuolo, later sold to (Denmark) F.C. Copenhagen)

=== Altay ===
In:

No.	Pos.	Nation	Player

Out:

No.	Pos.	Nation	Player

=== Antalyaspor ===
In:

No.	Pos.	Nation	Player
14	FW	(Switzerland) SUI	Admir Mehmedi (from (Germany) VfL Wolfsburg)

Out:

No.	Pos.	Nation	Player
—	FW	(France) FRA	Enzo Crivelli (loan return to İstanbul Başakşehir, later loaned to (France) Saint-Étienne)
—	FW	(Nigeria) NGA	Paul Mukairu (to (Denmark) F.C. Copenhagen)

=== Beşiktaş ===
In:

No.	Pos.	Nation	Player
—	MF	(Portugal) POR	Gedson Fernandes (from (Portugal) Benfica, transfer will go through on 1 July)

Out:

No.	Pos.	Nation	Player

=== Çaykur Rizespor ===
In:

No.	Pos.	Nation	Player
83	MF	(Portugal) POR	Gedson Fernandes (on loan from (Portugal) Benfica)

Out:

No.	Pos.	Nation	Player

=== Fatih Karagümrük ===
In:

No.	Pos.	Nation	Player
—	MF	(Croatia) CRO	Kristijan Bistrović (on loan from (Russia) CSKA Moscow)

Out:

No.	Pos.	Nation	Player
26	DF	(Norway) NOR	Vegar Eggen Hedenstad (to (Norway) Vålerenga)

=== Fenerbahçe ===
In:

No.	Pos.	Nation	Player

Out:

No.	Pos.	Nation	Player
6	MF	(Germany) GER	Max Meyer (on loan to (Denmark) Midtjylland)
—	FW	(Iran) IRN	Allahyar Sayyadmanesh (on loan to (England) Hull City, previously on loan at (Ukraine) Zorya Luhansk)

=== Galatasaray ===
In:

No.	Pos.	Nation	Player
26	GK	(Spain) ESP	Iñaki Peña (on loan from (Spain) Barcelona)

Out:

No.	Pos.	Nation	Player
—	DF	(United States) USA	DeAndre Yedlin (to (United States) Inter Miami)

=== Gaziantep ===
In:

No.	Pos.	Nation	Player

Out:

No.	Pos.	Nation	Player

=== Giresunspor ===
In:

No.	Pos.	Nation	Player
22	MF	(Portugal) POR	Chiquinho (on loan from (Portugal) Benfica)

Out:

No.	Pos.	Nation	Player
—	MF	(Senegal) SEN	Younousse Sankharé (released)

=== Göztepe ===
In:

No.	Pos.	Nation	Player
34	MF	(Morocco) MAR	Oussama Tannane (from (Netherlands) Vitesse)

Out:

No.	Pos.	Nation	Player

=== Hatayspor ===
In:

No.	Pos.	Nation	Player

Out:

No.	Pos.	Nation	Player

=== İstanbul Başakşehir ===
In:

No.	Pos.	Nation	Player
20	MF	(Portugal) POR	Pizzi (on loan from (Portugal) Benfica)
27	MF	(Egypt) EGY	Trézéguet (on loan from (England) Aston Villa)

Out:

No.	Pos.	Nation	Player
17	FW	(Turkey) TUR	Ahmed Kutucu (on loan to (Germany) SV Sandhausen)
—	FW	(France) FRA	Enzo Crivelli (on loan to (France) Saint-Étienne, previously on loan at Antalyaspor)

=== Kasımpaşa ===
In:

No.	Pos.	Nation	Player
70	MF	(Senegal) SEN	Mamadou Fall (from (Belgium) Sporting Charleroi)
93	DF	(Serbia) SRB	Uroš Spajić (from (Russia) Krasnodar)
—	FW	(Australia) AUS	Awer Mabil (on loan from (Denmark) Midtjylland)
—	FW	(Democratic Republic of the Congo) COD	Jackson Muleka (on loan from (Belgium) Standard Liège)

Out:

No.	Pos.	Nation	Player
21	MF	(Hungary) HUN	Kevin Varga (on loan to (Switzerland) Young Boys)
—	MF	(Kosovo) KOS	Loret Sadiku (to (Sweden) Hammarby IF)
—	FW	(Denmark) DEN	Nicolai Jørgensen (to (Denmark) Copenhagen)

=== Kayserispor ===
In:

No.	Pos.	Nation	Player
45	DF	(Turkey) TUR	Mert Çetin (on loan from (Italy) Hellas Verona)

Out:

No.	Pos.	Nation	Player

=== Konyaspor ===
In:

No.	Pos.	Nation	Player

Out:

No.	Pos.	Nation	Player

=== Sivasspor ===
In:

No.	Pos.	Nation	Player
15	FW	(Senegal) SEN	Moussa Konaté (on loan from (France) Dijon)

Out:

No.	Pos.	Nation	Player

=== Trabzonspor ===
In:

No.	Pos.	Nation	Player

Out:

No.	Pos.	Nation	Player

=== Yeni Malatyaspor ===
In:

No.	Pos.	Nation	Player
18	DF	(Algeria) ALG	Mehdi Zeffane (from (Russia) Krylia Sovetov Samara)

Out:

No.	Pos.	Nation	Player
