= List of Maltese football transfers winter 2010–11 =

This is a list of Maltese football transfers for the 2010–11 winter transfer window by club. Only transfers of clubs in the Maltese Premier League and Maltese First Division are included.

The winter transfer window opened on 1 January 2011, although a few transfers may take place prior to that date. The window closed at midnight on 31 January 2011. Players without a club may join one at any time, either during or in between transfer windows.

== Maltese Premier League ==
=== Birkirkara ===
In: Note: Flags indicate national team as defined under FIFA eligibility rules; some limited exceptions apply. Players may hold more than one non-FIFA nationality.

No.	Pos.	Nation	Player
4	DF	(Malta) MLT	Andrei Agius (on loan from (Italy) A.S. Melfi)
13	FW	(Brazil) BRA	Alemão (from Unknown)

Out: Note: Flags indicate national team as defined under FIFA eligibility rules; some limited exceptions apply. Players may hold more than one non-FIFA nationality.

No.	Pos.	Nation	Player
4	DF	(Malta) MLT	Thomas Paris (on loan to Floriana)
10	MF	(Malta) MLT	Alan Tabone (on loan to Vittoriosa Stars)

=== Floriana ===
In: Note: Flags indicate national team as defined under FIFA eligibility rules; some limited exceptions apply. Players may hold more than one non-FIFA nationality.

No.	Pos.	Nation	Player
—	DF	(Malta) MLT	Thomas Paris (on loan from Birkirkara)
13	MF	(Portugal) POR	Marçal Guerreiro Fernandes (from (Portugal) A.D. Lousada)
81	FW	(Bulgaria) BUL	Dragomir Draganov (from (Sweden) Syrianska IF Kerburan)
11	FW	(Nigeria) NGA	Daniel Nwoke (from (Finland) PK-35)

Out: Note: Flags indicate national team as defined under FIFA eligibility rules; some limited exceptions apply. Players may hold more than one non-FIFA nationality.

No.	Pos.	Nation	Player
—	DF	(Malta) MLT	Ian Darmanin (on loan to Msida Saint-Joseph)
18	FW	(Malta) MLT	Ryan Darmanin (on loan to Marsaxlokk)
11	FW	(United States) USA	Michael Mecerod (released)

=== Ħamrun Spartans ===
In: Note: Flags indicate national team as defined under FIFA eligibility rules; some limited exceptions apply. Players may hold more than one non-FIFA nationality.

No.	Pos.	Nation	Player
—	MF	(Malta) MLT	Dyson Falzon (on loan from Valletta)
—	FW	(Malta) MLT	Dylan Kokavessis (on loan from Marsaxlokk)

Out: Note: Flags indicate national team as defined under FIFA eligibility rules; some limited exceptions apply. Players may hold more than one non-FIFA nationality.

No.	Pos.	Nation	Player
—	MF	(Malta) MLT	Ryan Fenech (to Valletta)

=== Hibernians ===
In: Note: Flags indicate national team as defined under FIFA eligibility rules; some limited exceptions apply. Players may hold more than one non-FIFA nationality.

No.	Pos.	Nation	Player
—	FW	(Netherlands) NED	Jamal Dibi (from (Qatar) Umm Salal)

Out: Note: Flags indicate national team as defined under FIFA eligibility rules; some limited exceptions apply. Players may hold more than one non-FIFA nationality.

No.	Pos.	Nation	Player
21	MF	(Serbia) SRB	Zoran Levnaić (to (Kuwait) Al-Salmiya)

=== Marsaxlokk ===
In: Note: Flags indicate national team as defined under FIFA eligibility rules; some limited exceptions apply. Players may hold more than one non-FIFA nationality.

No.	Pos.	Nation	Player
—	DF	(Italy) ITA	Luca Lodetti (from (Italy) F.C. AlzanoCene 1909)
35	MF	(Benin) BEN	Florent Raimy (from (Cyprus) Omonia Aradippou)
—	FW	(Malta) MLT	Ryan Darmanin (on loan from Floriana)

Out: Note: Flags indicate national team as defined under FIFA eligibility rules; some limited exceptions apply. Players may hold more than one non-FIFA nationality.

No.	Pos.	Nation	Player
22	FW	(Malta) MLT	Dylan Kokavessis (on loan to Ħamrun Spartans)

=== Qormi ===
In: Note: Flags indicate national team as defined under FIFA eligibility rules; some limited exceptions apply. Players may hold more than one non-FIFA nationality.

No.	Pos.	Nation	Player
9	FW	(Malta) MLT	Michael Mifsud (from Free Agent)

Out: Note: Flags indicate national team as defined under FIFA eligibility rules; some limited exceptions apply. Players may hold more than one non-FIFA nationality.

No.	Pos.	Nation	Player

=== Sliema Wanderers ===
In: Note: Flags indicate national team as defined under FIFA eligibility rules; some limited exceptions apply. Players may hold more than one non-FIFA nationality.

No.	Pos.	Nation	Player
—	FW	(Malta) MLT	Etienne Barbara (on loan from (United States) Carolina RailHawks)
20	FW	(Tunisia) TUN	Chakib Lachkham (from (Libya) Annajma)

Out: Note: Flags indicate national team as defined under FIFA eligibility rules; some limited exceptions apply. Players may hold more than one non-FIFA nationality.

No.	Pos.	Nation	Player
6	DF	(Ivory Coast) CIV	Sékou Tidiane Souare (released)
—	MF	(Brazil) BRA	Valdo Gonçalves Alhinho (to Msida Saint-Joseph)

=== Tarxien Rainbows ===
In: Note: Flags indicate national team as defined under FIFA eligibility rules; some limited exceptions apply. Players may hold more than one non-FIFA nationality.

No.	Pos.	Nation	Player

Out: Note: Flags indicate national team as defined under FIFA eligibility rules; some limited exceptions apply. Players may hold more than one non-FIFA nationality.

No.	Pos.	Nation	Player
23	MF	(Malta) MLT	Ryan Grech (to Vittoriosa Stars)

=== Valletta ===
In: Note: Flags indicate national team as defined under FIFA eligibility rules; some limited exceptions apply. Players may hold more than one non-FIFA nationality.

No.	Pos.	Nation	Player
—	MF	(Malta) MLT	Ryan Fenech (from Ħamrun Spartans)

Out: Note: Flags indicate national team as defined under FIFA eligibility rules; some limited exceptions apply. Players may hold more than one non-FIFA nationality.

No.	Pos.	Nation	Player
20	MF	(Malta) MLT	Dyson Falzon (on loan to Ħamrun Spartans)

=== Vittoriosa Stars ===
In: Note: Flags indicate national team as defined under FIFA eligibility rules; some limited exceptions apply. Players may hold more than one non-FIFA nationality.

No.	Pos.	Nation	Player
—	MF	(Malta) MLT	Ryan Grech (from Tarxien Rainbows)
—	MF	(Brazil) BRA	Murilo Maccari (from Free Agent)
—	MF	(Malta) MLT	Alan Tabone (on loan from Birkirkara)

Out: Note: Flags indicate national team as defined under FIFA eligibility rules; some limited exceptions apply. Players may hold more than one non-FIFA nationality.

No.	Pos.	Nation	Player

== Maltese First Division ==
=== Balzan Youths ===
In: Note: Flags indicate national team as defined under FIFA eligibility rules; some limited exceptions apply. Players may hold more than one non-FIFA nationality.

No.	Pos.	Nation	Player

Out: Note: Flags indicate national team as defined under FIFA eligibility rules; some limited exceptions apply. Players may hold more than one non-FIFA nationality.

No.	Pos.	Nation	Player

=== Dingli Swallows ===
In: Note: Flags indicate national team as defined under FIFA eligibility rules; some limited exceptions apply. Players may hold more than one non-FIFA nationality.

No.	Pos.	Nation	Player

Out: Note: Flags indicate national team as defined under FIFA eligibility rules; some limited exceptions apply. Players may hold more than one non-FIFA nationality.

No.	Pos.	Nation	Player

=== Lija Athletic ===
In: Note: Flags indicate national team as defined under FIFA eligibility rules; some limited exceptions apply. Players may hold more than one non-FIFA nationality.

No.	Pos.	Nation	Player

Out: Note: Flags indicate national team as defined under FIFA eligibility rules; some limited exceptions apply. Players may hold more than one non-FIFA nationality.

No.	Pos.	Nation	Player

=== Melita ===
In: Note: Flags indicate national team as defined under FIFA eligibility rules; some limited exceptions apply. Players may hold more than one non-FIFA nationality.

No.	Pos.	Nation	Player

Out: Note: Flags indicate national team as defined under FIFA eligibility rules; some limited exceptions apply. Players may hold more than one non-FIFA nationality.

No.	Pos.	Nation	Player

=== Mosta ===
In: Note: Flags indicate national team as defined under FIFA eligibility rules; some limited exceptions apply. Players may hold more than one non-FIFA nationality.

No.	Pos.	Nation	Player
—	MF	(Lebanon) LBN	Firas Abouleez (on loan from Attard)

Out: Note: Flags indicate national team as defined under FIFA eligibility rules; some limited exceptions apply. Players may hold more than one non-FIFA nationality.

No.	Pos.	Nation	Player

=== Mqabba ===
In: Note: Flags indicate national team as defined under FIFA eligibility rules; some limited exceptions apply. Players may hold more than one non-FIFA nationality.

No.	Pos.	Nation	Player

Out: Note: Flags indicate national team as defined under FIFA eligibility rules; some limited exceptions apply. Players may hold more than one non-FIFA nationality.

No.	Pos.	Nation	Player

=== Msida Saint-Joseph ===
In: Note: Flags indicate national team as defined under FIFA eligibility rules; some limited exceptions apply. Players may hold more than one non-FIFA nationality.

No.	Pos.	Nation	Player
—	DF	(Malta) MLT	Ian Darmanin (on loan from Floriana)
—	MF	(Brazil) BRA	Valdo Gonçalves Alhinho (from Sliema Wanderers)

Out: Note: Flags indicate national team as defined under FIFA eligibility rules; some limited exceptions apply. Players may hold more than one non-FIFA nationality.

No.	Pos.	Nation	Player

=== Pietà Hotspurs ===
In: Note: Flags indicate national team as defined under FIFA eligibility rules; some limited exceptions apply. Players may hold more than one non-FIFA nationality.

No.	Pos.	Nation	Player

Out: Note: Flags indicate national team as defined under FIFA eligibility rules; some limited exceptions apply. Players may hold more than one non-FIFA nationality.

No.	Pos.	Nation	Player

=== St. Andrews ===
In: Note: Flags indicate national team as defined under FIFA eligibility rules; some limited exceptions apply. Players may hold more than one non-FIFA nationality.

No.	Pos.	Nation	Player

Out: Note: Flags indicate national team as defined under FIFA eligibility rules; some limited exceptions apply. Players may hold more than one non-FIFA nationality.

No.	Pos.	Nation	Player

=== St. George's ===
In: Note: Flags indicate national team as defined under FIFA eligibility rules; some limited exceptions apply. Players may hold more than one non-FIFA nationality.

No.	Pos.	Nation	Player

Out: Note: Flags indicate national team as defined under FIFA eligibility rules; some limited exceptions apply. Players may hold more than one non-FIFA nationality.

No.	Pos.	Nation	Player

== Manager Transfers ==
Name	Moving from	Moving to	Source
(Malta) Mark Marlow	Sliema Wanderers	released	
(Serbia) Danilo Dončić	unattached	Sliema Wanderers	
