= List of Croatian football transfers summer 2018 =

This is a list of Croatian football transfers for the 2018 summer transfer window. Only transfers featuring Hrvatski Telekom Prva liga are listed.

== Croatian First Football League ==
Note: Flags indicate national team as has been defined under FIFA eligibility rules. Players may hold more than one non-FIFA nationality.

=== Dinamo Zagreb ===
In:

No.	Pos.	Nation	Player
10	MF	CRO	Lovro Majer (from Lokomotiva)
22	DF	CRO	Marin Leovac (from (Greece) PAOK)
28	DF	FRA	Kévin Théophile-Catherine (from (France) Saint-Étienne)
66	DF	AUT	Emir Dilaver (from (Poland) Lech Poznań)
92	MF	POL	Damian Kądzior (from (Poland) Górnik Zabrze)
99	MF	CRO	Mislav Oršić (from (South Korea) Ulsan Hyundai)
—	DF	IRN	Sadegh Moharrami (from (Iran) Persepolis)

Out:

No.	Pos.	Nation	Player
2	FW	ALG	Hillal Soudani (to (England) Nottingham Forest)
3	DF	CRO	Borna Sosa (to (Germany) VfB Stuttgart)
10	MF	CRO	Ante Ćorić (to (Italy) Roma)

=== Gorica ===
In:

No.	Pos.	Nation	Player
—	FW	POL	Łukasz Zwoliński (from (Poland) Pogoń Szczecin)

Out:

No.	Pos.	Nation	Player

=== Hajduk Split ===
In:

No.	Pos.	Nation	Player
1	GK	CRO	Tomislav Duka (from (Romania) CFR Cluj)
4	DF	CRO	Božo Mikulić (from (Italy) Sampdoria)
7	MF	HUN	Ádám Gyurcsó (from (Poland) Pogoń Szczecin, previously on loan)
8	FW	MKD	Mirko Ivanovski (from Slaven Belupo)
—	DF	AUT	Stipe Vučur (from (Germany) 1. FC Kaiserslautern)

Out:

No.	Pos.	Nation	Player
1	GK	CRO	Dante Stipica (to (Bulgaria) CSKA Sofia)
18	MF	BIH	Zvonimir Kožulj (to (Poland) Pogoń Szczecin)
25	GK	CRO	Karlo Letica (to (Belgium) Club Brugge)

=== Inter Zaprešić ===
In: Note: Flags indicate national team as defined under FIFA eligibility rules; some limited exceptions apply. Players may hold more than one non-FIFA nationality.

No.	Pos.	Nation	Player
—	GK	CRO	Ivan Kelava (from (Romania) Politehnica Iași)

Out:

No.	Pos.	Nation	Player
3	DF	CRO	Petar Mamić (to Rijeka)
25	MF	CRO	Tomislav Šarić (to (Latvia) Riga)
28	MF	CRO	Tomislav Mazalović (to (Hungary) Diósgyőri)

=== Istra 1961 ===
In:

No.	Pos.	Nation	Player

Out: Note: Flags indicate national team as defined under FIFA eligibility rules; some limited exceptions apply. Players may hold more than one non-FIFA nationality.

No.	Pos.	Nation	Player
7	MF	CRO	Dino Halilović (to Lokomotiva)
13	DF	CRO	Ivan Zgrablić (to (Romania) Voluntari)

=== Lokomotiva ===
In: Note: Flags indicate national team as defined under FIFA eligibility rules; some limited exceptions apply. Players may hold more than one non-FIFA nationality.

No.	Pos.	Nation	Player
—	MF	CRO	Dino Halilović (from Istra 1961)
—	MF	CRO	Neven Đurasek (from Dinamo Zagreb)
—	FW	CRO	Ivan Božić (from Dinamo Zagreb)
—	MF	CMR	Molls Donald Ntchamda (from (Cameroon) Dragon Yaoundé)

Out: Note: Flags indicate national team as defined under FIFA eligibility rules; some limited exceptions apply. Players may hold more than one non-FIFA nationality.

No.	Pos.	Nation	Player
10	MF	CRO	Lovro Majer (to Dinamo Zagreb)

=== Osijek ===
In:

No.	Pos.	Nation	Player
—	MF	CRO	Karlo Kamenar (from Rudeš)
—	DF	BIH	Stjepan Radeljić (from (Germany) Stuttgart II)
—	GK	CRO	Ivica Ivušić (from (Greece) Olympiacos)
—	FW	NGA	Ezekiel Henty (on loan from (Hungary) Videoton)

Out:

No.	Pos.	Nation	Player

=== Rijeka ===
In:

No.	Pos.	Nation	Player
—	DF	AUT	Mario Pavelić (from (Austria) Rapid Wien)
—	DF	MKD	Darko Velkovski (from (North Macedonia) Vardar)
—	MF	BIH	Stjepan Lončar (from (Bosnia and Herzegovina) Široki Brijeg)
—	DF	CRO	Petar Mamić (from Inter Zaprešić)

Out: Note: Flags indicate national team as defined under FIFA eligibility rules; some limited exceptions apply. Players may hold more than one non-FIFA nationality.

No.	Pos.	Nation	Player
—	MF	ROU	Florentin Matei (to (United Arab Emirates) Ittihad Kalba)

=== Rudeš ===
In:

No.	Pos.	Nation	Player

Out:

No.	Pos.	Nation	Player
10	MF	CRO	Karlo Kamenar (to Osijek)

=== Slaven Belupo ===
In:

No.	Pos.	Nation	Player

Out:

No.	Pos.	Nation	Player
22	FW	MKD	Mirko Ivanovski (to Hajduk Split)

== See also ==
- 2018–19 Croatian First Football League
