= List of Hungarian football transfers 2007–08 =

This is a list of Hungarian football transfers for the 2007–08 season. Only moves from the Borsodi Liga are listed.

== Summer transfer window ==
=== May ===
Date	Name	Nat	Moving from	Moving to	Fee
May 26, 2007	Krisztián Németh	(Hungary)	MTK Budapest	Liverpool F.C.	Undisclosed
May 26, 2007	András Simon	(Hungary)	MTK Budapest	Liverpool F.C.	Undisclosed
