= List of Hungarian football transfers summer 2022 =

This is a list of Hungarian football transfers in the summer transfer window 2022 by club.

== Nemzeti Bajnokság I ==
=== Debrecen ===
In: Note: Flags indicate national team as defined under FIFA eligibility rules; some limited exceptions apply. Players may hold more than one non-FIFA nationality.

No.	Pos.	Nation	Player
—	DF	UKR	Oleksandr Romanchuk (from (Ukraine) Lviv)

Out: Note: Flags indicate national team as defined under FIFA eligibility rules; some limited exceptions apply. Players may hold more than one non-FIFA nationality.

No.	Pos.	Nation	Player

=== Fehérvár ===
In: Note: Flags indicate national team as defined under FIFA eligibility rules; some limited exceptions apply. Players may hold more than one non-FIFA nationality.

No.	Pos.	Nation	Player

Out: Note: Flags indicate national team as defined under FIFA eligibility rules; some limited exceptions apply. Players may hold more than one non-FIFA nationality.

No.	Pos.	Nation	Player

=== Ferencváros ===
In: Note: Flags indicate national team as defined under FIFA eligibility rules; some limited exceptions apply. Players may hold more than one non-FIFA nationality.

No.	Pos.	Nation	Player
—	DF	DEN	Rasmus Thelander (from (Denmark) AaB)
—	MF	SYR	Ammar Ramadan (loan return from (Slovenia) Spartak Trnava)

Out: Note: Flags indicate national team as defined under FIFA eligibility rules; some limited exceptions apply. Players may hold more than one non-FIFA nationality.

No.	Pos.	Nation	Player
—	MF	UKR	Oleksandr Zubkov (to (Ukraine) Shakhtar Donetsk)

=== Honvéd ===
In: Note: Flags indicate national team as defined under FIFA eligibility rules; some limited exceptions apply. Players may hold more than one non-FIFA nationality.

No.	Pos.	Nation	Player
—	MF	ISR	Maxim Plakuschenko (from (Israel) Maccabi Haifa)
—	FW	CAN	Richie Ennin (on loan from (Latvia) Spartaks Jūrmala)

Out: Note: Flags indicate national team as defined under FIFA eligibility rules; some limited exceptions apply. Players may hold more than one non-FIFA nationality.

No.	Pos.	Nation	Player
—	DF	ALB	Naser Aliji (to (Romania) Voluntari)
—	MF	GHA	Mohammed Kadiri (loan return to (Ukraine) Dynamo Kyiv)

=== Kecskemét ===
In: Note: Flags indicate national team as defined under FIFA eligibility rules; some limited exceptions apply. Players may hold more than one non-FIFA nationality.

No.	Pos.	Nation	Player
—	MF	UKR	Mykhaylo Meskhi (from (Ukraine) Mynai)

Out: Note: Flags indicate national team as defined under FIFA eligibility rules; some limited exceptions apply. Players may hold more than one non-FIFA nationality.

No.	Pos.	Nation	Player

=== Kisvárda ===
In: Note: Flags indicate national team as defined under FIFA eligibility rules; some limited exceptions apply. Players may hold more than one non-FIFA nationality.

No.	Pos.	Nation	Player
—	GK	ROU	Otto Hindrich (on loan from (Romania) CFR Cluj)
—	DF	CRO	Dominik Kovačić (from (Romania) FC U Craiova)
—	FW	MKD	Mario Ilievski (from (Bulgaria) Septemvri Sofia)

Out: Note: Flags indicate national team as defined under FIFA eligibility rules; some limited exceptions apply. Players may hold more than one non-FIFA nationality.

No.	Pos.	Nation	Player

=== Mezőkövesd ===
In: Note: Flags indicate national team as defined under FIFA eligibility rules; some limited exceptions apply. Players may hold more than one non-FIFA nationality.

No.	Pos.	Nation	Player

Out: Note: Flags indicate national team as defined under FIFA eligibility rules; some limited exceptions apply. Players may hold more than one non-FIFA nationality.

No.	Pos.	Nation	Player
—	MF	ROU	Andreias Calcan (to (Romania) Argeș Pitești)
—	MF	UKR	Vyacheslav Churko (loan return to (Ukraine) Kolos Kovalivka)

=== Paks ===
In: Note: Flags indicate national team as defined under FIFA eligibility rules; some limited exceptions apply. Players may hold more than one non-FIFA nationality.

No.	Pos.	Nation	Player

Out: Note: Flags indicate national team as defined under FIFA eligibility rules; some limited exceptions apply. Players may hold more than one non-FIFA nationality.

No.	Pos.	Nation	Player

=== Puskás Akadémia ===
In: Note: Flags indicate national team as defined under FIFA eligibility rules; some limited exceptions apply. Players may hold more than one non-FIFA nationality.

No.	Pos.	Nation	Player
21	MF	HUN	Tamás Kiss (loan return to (Netherlands) SC Cambuur)

Out: Note: Flags indicate national team as defined under FIFA eligibility rules; some limited exceptions apply. Players may hold more than one non-FIFA nationality.

No.	Pos.	Nation	Player
3	DF	POR	João Nunes (to (Portugal) Casa Pia A.C.)
—	DF	POR	João Nunes (to (Portugal) Casa Pia A.C.)
—	MF	UKR	Kyrylo Yanitskyi (on loan to Csákvár)

=== Újpest ===
In: Note: Flags indicate national team as defined under FIFA eligibility rules; some limited exceptions apply. Players may hold more than one non-FIFA nationality.

No.	Pos.	Nation	Player

Out: Note: Flags indicate national team as defined under FIFA eligibility rules; some limited exceptions apply. Players may hold more than one non-FIFA nationality.

No.	Pos.	Nation	Player

=== Zalaegerszeg ===
In: Note: Flags indicate national team as defined under FIFA eligibility rules; some limited exceptions apply. Players may hold more than one non-FIFA nationality.

No.	Pos.	Nation	Player
—	DF	UKR	Oleksandr Safronov (from (Ukraine) Desna Chernihiv)
—	DF	HUN	Dániel Csóka (from (England) AFC Wimbledon)
—	MF	BRA	Diego Carioca (on loan from (Ukraine) Kolos Kovalivka)

Out: Note: Flags indicate national team as defined under FIFA eligibility rules; some limited exceptions apply. Players may hold more than one non-FIFA nationality.

No.	Pos.	Nation	Player
—	DF	HUN	Martin Majnovics (on loan to (Austria) SV Horn)
—	DF	HUN	Erik Németh (on loan to (Slovenia) NK Nafta)
—	MF	HUN	Barnabás Kovács (on loan to Tiszakécske)
—	MF	HUN	Dániel Németh (on loan to (Slovenia) NK Nafta)
—	MF	HUN	Bence Szabó (on loan to (Slovenia) NK Nafta)
—	FW	HUN	Dávid Zimonyi (on loan to Vasas)
—	MF	HUN	Dániel Szökrönyös (on loan to Kecskemét)
