= List of Austrian football transfers winter 2017–18 =

This is a list of Austrian football transfers for the 2017–18 winter transfer window by club. Only transfers of clubs in the Austrian Football Bundesliga are included.

== Austrian Football Bundesliga ==
=== Admira Wacker Mödling ===
In:

No.	Pos.	Nation	Player

Out:

No.	Pos.	Nation	Player

=== Austria Wien ===
In:

No.	Pos.	Nation	Player
91	DF	AUT	Stefan Stangl (on loan from Red Bull Salzburg)
--	DF	AUT	Michael Madl (from (England) Fulham)

Out:

No.	Pos.	Nation	Player
7	MF	LBY	Ismael Tajouri (from (United States) New York City)

=== LASK Linz ===
In:

No.	Pos.	Nation	Player
20	FW	GHA	Samuel Tetteh (on loan from Red Bull Salzburg)

Out:

No.	Pos.	Nation	Player
14	FW	BRA	Bruno (on loan to (Greece) Atromitos)

=== Rapid Wien ===
In:

No.	Pos.	Nation	Player

Out:

No.	Pos.	Nation	Player
--	MF	AUT	Denis Bosnjak (on loan to Wiener Neustadt)
--	MF	ISL	Arnór Ingvi Traustason (to (Sweden) Malmö FF)
4	DF	AUT	Thomas Schrammel (to Sturm Graz)
16	MF	AUT	Philipp Malicsek (on loan to St. Pölten)
33	FW	AUT	Philipp Prosenik (to SV Ried)

=== Red Bull Salzburg ===
In:

No.	Pos.	Nation	Player
15	DF	BRA	André Ramalho (from (Germany) Eintracht Frankfurt)
16	MF	HUN	Dominik Szoboszlai (from Liefering)

Out:

No.	Pos.	Nation	Player
3	DF	BRA	Paulo Miranda (to (Brazil) Grêmio)
20	MF	GHA	David Atanga (on loan to St. Pölten)
23	DF	AUT	Stefan Stangl (on loan to Austria Wien)
29	FW	GHA	Samuel Tetteh (on loan to LASK Linz)

=== Rheindorf Altach ===
In:

No.	Pos.	Nation	Player

Out:

No.	Pos.	Nation	Player
6	DF	AUT	Emanuel Sakic (to (Greece) Atromitos)
11	FW	GHA	Bernard Tekpetey (loan return to (Germany) Schalke 04)

=== St. Pölten ===
In:

No.	Pos.	Nation	Player
--	MF	GHA	David Atanga (on loan from Red Bull Salzburg)
--	MF	AUT	Philipp Malicsek (on loan from Rapid Wien)

Out:

No.	Pos.	Nation	Player

=== Sturm Graz ===
In:

No.	Pos.	Nation	Player

Out:

No.	Pos.	Nation	Player

=== SV Mattersburg ===
In:

No.	Pos.	Nation	Player

Out:

No.	Pos.	Nation	Player

=== Wolfsberger AC ===
In:

No.	Pos.	Nation	Player

Out:

No.	Pos.	Nation	Player
