= List of Danish football transfers winter 2010–11 =

This is a list of Danish football transfers for the 2010-11 winter transfer window. Only moves featuring at least one Danish Superliga club are listed.

The winter transfer window opened on 1 January 2011. The window closed at midnight on 1 February 2011.

== Transfers ==
Date	Name	Moving from	Moving to	Fee
1 January 2011	Dickson Nwakaeme	AaB	FC OPA	Return from loan
1 January 2011	Jones Kusi-Asare	AaB	Esbjerg fB	Return from loan
4 January 2011	Hjalte Bo Nørregaard	FC Copenhagen	Aarhus GF	Free
