= List of Portuguese football transfers winter 2010–11 =

This is a list of Portuguese winter football transfers for the 2010–11 season. The winter transfer window opened on 1 January 2011 and closed on 31 January 2011. Players could be bought before the transfer window opened, but were not permitted to join their new clubs until 1 January. Additionally, players without a club could join at any time and clubs were able to sign a goalkeeper on an emergency loan if they had no registered goalkeeper available. Only moves involving Primeira Liga clubs are listed; included are clubs that completed transfers after the closing of the summer 2010 transfer window due to other domestic leagues having a later closure date to their transfer window.

== Transfers ==
| Date | Name | Moving from | Moving to | Fee |
|---|---|---|---|---|
| 16 December 2010 | (Brazil) Patric | (Portugal) Benfica | (Brazil) Atlético Mineiro | €1,000,000 |
| 6 January 2011 | (Argentina) José Luis Fernández | (Argentina) Racing | (Portugal) Benfica | Undisclosed |
| 11 January 2011 | (Portugal) André Castro | (Portugal) Porto | (Spain) Sporting de Gijón | Loan |
| 13 January 2011 | (Brazil) Jardel | (Portugal) Olhanense | (Portugal) Benfica | Undisclosed |
| 24 January 2011 | (Brazil) Kanu | (Portugal) Beira-Mar | (Belgium) Standard Liège | €350,000 |
| 24 January 2011 | (Equatorial Guinea) Javier Balboa | (Portugal) Benfica | (Spain) Albacete | Loan |
| 26 January 2011 | (France) Lionel Carole | (France) Nantes | (Portugal) Benfica | €750,000 |
| 26 January 2011 | (Portugal) Tony | (Romania) Cluj | (Portugal) Vitória de Guimarães | Free |
| 27 January 2011 | (Angola) Stélvio | (Portugal) Braga | (Portugal) Sporting da Covilhã | Loan |
| 27 January 2011 | (Portugal) Nuno Valente | (Portugal) Braga | (Portugal) Sporting da Covilhã | Loan |
| 27 January 2011 | (France) Ulick Lupede | (Portugal) Naval | (Portugal) Sporting da Covilhã | Free |
| 27 January 2011 | (Australia) Jason Davidson | (Portugal) Paços de Ferreira | (Portugal) Sporting da Covilhã | Loan |
| 28 January 2011 | (Portugal) Ricardo Rocha | (Portugal) Chaves | (Portugal) Beira-Mar | Free |
| 30 January 2011 | (Slovenia) Jan Oblak | (Portugal) Benfica | (Portugal) Olhanense | Loan |
| 30 January 2011 | (Ghana) William Tiero | (Bulgaria) CSKA Sofia | (Portugal) Olhanense | Free |
| 31 January 2011 | (Portugal) Liédson | (Portugal) Sporting CP | (Brazil) Corinthians | Undisclosed |
| 31 January 2011 | (Brazil) David Luiz | (Portugal) Benfica | (England) Chelsea | €25,000,000 |

- ^1 Some players may have been bought after the end of the 2010 summer transfer window in Portugal but before the end of that country's transfer window closed.
