= List of Albanian football transfers winter 2009–10 =

This is a list of Albanian football transfers in the summer transfer window 2010 by club.

== Superliga ==
=== Dinamo Tirana ===
In: Note: Flags indicate national team as defined under FIFA eligibility rules; some limited exceptions apply. Players may hold more than one non-FIFA nationality.

No.	Pos.	Nation	Player
9	FW	ARG	Maximiliano Timpanaro (on loan from (Argentina) Vélez Sársfield)
11	FW	ALB	Emiljano Vila (on loan from (Croatia) Dinamo Zagreb)
20	MF	ALB	Eni Imami (from Dinamo Tirana U-19)

Out: Note: Flags indicate national team as defined under FIFA eligibility rules; some limited exceptions apply. Players may hold more than one non-FIFA nationality.

No.	Pos.	Nation	Player
24	MF	ALB	Gerhard Progni (to Flamurtari)
9	FW	ALB	Sebino Plaku (to KF Tirana)
4	MF	ALB	Asion Daja (on loan to Shkumbini Peqin)
--	DF	ALB	Marsel Zhilla (on loan to KS Kamza)
--	FW	ALB	Rigels Nezaj (on loan to KS Turbina Cërrik)
--	MF	ALB	Erlind Burhanaj (on loan to KF Skrapari)
--	MF	ALB	Andi Hasa (on loan to KF Skrapari)
--	MF	ALB	Amarildo Takaci (on loan to KS Sopoti)
--	MF	ALB	Elio Dubali (on loan to KS Sopoti)
--	MF	ALB	Mikael Hamzallari (on loan to KS Sopoti)

=== Besa Kavajë ===
In: Note: Flags indicate national team as defined under FIFA eligibility rules; some limited exceptions apply. Players may hold more than one non-FIFA nationality.

No.	Pos.	Nation	Player
9	FW	ALB	Vioresin Sinani (from Vllaznia)
12	GK	ALB	Edvan Bakaj (from KF Laçi)
10	MF	ALB	Bledi Shkëmbi (from Skënderbeu Korçë)
--	MF	ALB	Rigers Cobani (from Partizani Tirana)

Out: Note: Flags indicate national team as defined under FIFA eligibility rules; some limited exceptions apply. Players may hold more than one non-FIFA nationality.

No.	Pos.	Nation	Player
3	DF	KOS	Liridon Leçi (on loan to Vllaznia)
--	MF	ALB	Bruno Okshluni (on loan to KS Luftëtari)

=== KF Tirana ===
In: Note: Flags indicate national team as defined under FIFA eligibility rules; some limited exceptions apply. Players may hold more than one non-FIFA nationality.

No.	Pos.	Nation	Player
9	FW	ALB	Sebino Plaku (from Dinamo Tirana)
—	FW	ALB	Hendrit Ferra (loan return from Teuta)

Out: Note: Flags indicate national team as defined under FIFA eligibility rules; some limited exceptions apply. Players may hold more than one non-FIFA nationality.

No.	Pos.	Nation	Player
13	MF	ALB	Sajmir Patushi (to KS Kamza)
9	FW	ALB	Migen Memelli (to Flamurtari)
31	GK	ALB	Klajdi Kuka (on loan to Tomori Berat)
—	FW	ALB	Besian Celiku (on loan to Skënderbeu Korçë)
—	FW	ALB	Enco Malindi (on loan to Skënderbeu Korçë)
—	DF	ALB	Albi Çeliku (on loan to KS Lushnja)
—	FW	ALB	Samet Gjoka (on loan to Partizani Tirana)
—	FW	ALB	Hendrit Ferra (on loan to KS Elbasani)
