= List of Slovenian football transfers winter 2021–22 =

This is a list of Slovenian football transfers featuring at least one 2021–22 Slovenian PrvaLiga club which were completed during the 2021–22 winter transfer window.

== List ==
Date	Player	Moving from	Moving to	Fee
11 January 2022	(Montenegro) Ilija Martinović	Maribor	(Ukraine) Chornomorets Odesa	Transfer
13 January 2022	(Slovenia) Rudi Požeg Vancaš	Maribor	(Ukraine) Chornomorets Odesa	Loan
13 January 2022	(Belgium) Ibrahim Kargbo Jr.	(Ukraine) Dynamo Kyiv	Celje	Loan
14 January 2022	(Slovenia) Žan Karničnik	Mura	(Bulgaria) Ludogorets Razgrad	Undisclosed
15 January 2022	(Slovenia) Blaž Vrhovec	Maribor	(Cyprus) Anorthosis Famagusta	Undisclosed
18 January 2022	(Slovenia) Mario Kvesić	(South Korea) Pohang Steelers	Olimpija Ljubljana	Free
18 January 2022	(Slovenia) Karlo Plantak	(Croatia) Kustošija	Alumnij	Undisclosed
20 January 2022	(Slovenia) Đorđe Ivanović	(Ukraine) Shakhtyor Soligorsk	Maribor	Loan
26 March 2022	(Ukraine) Oleksandr Safronov	(Ukraine) Desna Chernihiv	NK Nafta 1903	Loan
