= List of Swedish football transfers summer 2016 =

This is a list of Swedish football transfers in the 2016 summer transfer window by club. Only clubs in the 2016 Allsvenskan are included.

== Allsvenskan ==
=== AIK ===
In:

No.	Pos.	Nation	Player
7	FW	(Nigeria) NGA	Chinedu Obasi (free agent)
14	FW	(Nigeria) NGA	John Chibuike (from (Turkey) Gaziantepspor)
23	MF	(Sweden) SWE	Rickson Mansiamina (loan return from (Finland) HIFK Fotboll)

Out:

No.	Pos.	Nation	Player
7	FW	(Norway) NOR	Fredrik Brustad (to (Norway) Molde)
28	MF	(Sweden) SWE	Niclas Eliasson (on loan to (Sweden) Norrköping)
—	MF	(Sweden) SWE	William Sheriff (to (Sweden) Karlberg)

=== BK Häcken ===
In:

No.	Pos.	Nation	Player
25	DF	(Sweden) SWE	Egzon Binaku (loan return from (Sweden) Ljungskile)

Out:

No.	Pos.	Nation	Player
4	DF	(South Africa) RSA	Tefu Mashamaite (to (South Africa) SuperSport United)

=== Djurgårdens IF ===
In:

No.	Pos.	Nation	Player
28	DF	(Norway) NOR	Niklas Gunnarsson (from (Norway) Vålerenga)
77	FW	(Sweden) SWE	Magnus Eriksson (from (Denmark) Brøndby)

Out:

No.	Pos.	Nation	Player

=== Falkenbergs FF ===
In:

No.	Pos.	Nation	Player

Out:

No.	Pos.	Nation	Player

=== Gefle IF ===
In:

No.	Pos.	Nation	Player

Out:

No.	Pos.	Nation	Player

=== GIF Sundsvall ===
In:

No.	Pos.	Nation	Player
35	GK	(Sweden) SWE	Jonathan Malmberg (loan return from (Norway) Levanger)

Out:

No.	Pos.	Nation	Player

=== Hammarby IF ===
In:

No.	Pos.	Nation	Player

Out:

No.	Pos.	Nation	Player
21	MF	(Sweden) SWE	Melker Hallberg (loan return to (Italy) Udinese)

=== Helsingborgs IF ===
In:

No.	Pos.	Nation	Player

Out:

No.	Pos.	Nation	Player

=== IF Elfsborg ===
In:

No.	Pos.	Nation	Player

Out:

No.	Pos.	Nation	Player

=== IFK Göteborg ===
In:

No.	Pos.	Nation	Player
13	FW	(Iceland) ISL	Elías Már Ómarsson (on loan from (Norway) Vålerenga)

Out:

No.	Pos.	Nation	Player

=== IFK Norrköping ===
In:

No.	Pos.	Nation	Player
22	MF	(Sweden) SWE	Niclas Eliasson (on loan from (Sweden) AIK)

Out:

No.	Pos.	Nation	Player

=== Jönköpings Södra IF ===
In:

No.	Pos.	Nation	Player

Out:

No.	Pos.	Nation	Player

=== Kalmar FF ===
In:

No.	Pos.	Nation	Player

Out:

No.	Pos.	Nation	Player
17	MF	(Sweden) SWE	Muktar Ahmed (on loan to (Sweden) Oskarshamn)
31	DF	(Sweden) SWE	Adel Ziarat (on loan to (Sweden) Oskarshamn)

=== Malmö FF ===
In:

No.	Pos.	Nation	Player

Out:

No.	Pos.	Nation	Player
24	FW	(Iceland) ISL	Viðar Örn Kjartansson (to (Israel) Maccabi Tel Aviv)

=== Örebro SK ===
In:

No.	Pos.	Nation	Player

Out:

No.	Pos.	Nation	Player

=== Östersunds FK ===
In:

No.	Pos.	Nation	Player

Out:

No.	Pos.	Nation	Player
9	FW	(Sweden) SWE	Emir Smajic (released)
77	GK	(Iceland) ISL	Haraldur Björnsson (to (Norway) Lillestrøm)

== Superettan ==
=== Dalkurd FF ===
In:

No.	Pos.	Nation	Player

Out:

No.	Pos.	Nation	Player

=== Degerfors IF ===
In:

No.	Pos.	Nation	Player

Out:

No.	Pos.	Nation	Player

=== IF Brommapojkarna ===
In:

No.	Pos.	Nation	Player

Out:

No.	Pos.	Nation	Player

=== Falkenbergs FF ===
In:

No.	Pos.	Nation	Player

Out:

No.	Pos.	Nation	Player

=== IK Frej ===
In:

No.	Pos.	Nation	Player

Out:

No.	Pos.	Nation	Player

=== GAIS ===
In:

No.	Pos.	Nation	Player

Out:

No.	Pos.	Nation	Player

=== Gefle IF ===
In:

No.	Pos.	Nation	Player

Out:

No.	Pos.	Nation	Player

=== Helsingborgs IF ===
In:

No.	Pos.	Nation	Player

Out:

No.	Pos.	Nation	Player

=== Norrby IF ===
In:

No.	Pos.	Nation	Player

Out:

No.	Pos.	Nation	Player

=== Syrianska FC ===
In:

No.	Pos.	Nation	Player

Out:

No.	Pos.	Nation	Player

=== Trelleborgs FF ===
In:

No.	Pos.	Nation	Player

Out:

No.	Pos.	Nation	Player

=== Varbergs BoIS ===
In:

No.	Pos.	Nation	Player

Out:

No.	Pos.	Nation	Player

=== IFK Värnamo ===
In:

No.	Pos.	Nation	Player

Out:

No.	Pos.	Nation	Player

=== Åtvidabergs FF ===
In:

No.	Pos.	Nation	Player

Out:

No.	Pos.	Nation	Player

=== Örgryte IS ===
In:

No.	Pos.	Nation	Player

Out:

No.	Pos.	Nation	Player

=== Östers IF ===
In:

No.	Pos.	Nation	Player

Out:

No.	Pos.	Nation	Player
