= List of Ukrainian football transfers winter 2014–15 =

This is a list of Ukrainian football transfers in the winter transfer window 2014-2015 by club. Only transfers of the Premier League are included.

== Premier League ==
=== Chornomorets Odesa ===
In: Note: Flags indicate national team as defined under FIFA eligibility rules; some limited exceptions apply. Players may hold more than one non-FIFA nationality.

No.	Pos.	Nation	Player
2	DF	(Ukraine) UKR	Yaroslav Oliynyk (from Olimpik Donetsk)
8	DF	(Ukraine) UKR	Anton Kicha (from Oleksandriya)
19	DF	(Ukraine) UKR	Oleksandr Kalitov (from Metalurh Donetsk)
39	FW	(Ukraine) UKR	Denys Vasin (from Illichivets)
42	MF	(Serbia) SRB	Jovan Krneta (from (Serbia) FK Radnički 1923)

Out: Note: Flags indicate national team as defined under FIFA eligibility rules; some limited exceptions apply. Players may hold more than one non-FIFA nationality.

No.	Pos.	Nation	Player
8	MF	(Ukraine) UKR	Kyrylo Kovalchuk (to Metalist)
10	MF	(Ukraine) UKR	Oleksiy Gai (to (Azerbaijan) Gabala FK)
11	MF	(Ukraine) UKR	Ivan Bobko (to Metalist)
12	GK	(Ukraine) UKR	Dmytro Bezotosnyi (to (Azerbaijan) Gabala FK)
17	MF	(Ukraine) UKR	Volodymyr Arzhanov (to (Kazakhstan) FC Atyrau)
19	FW	(Ukraine) UKR	Ruslan Fomin (to (Azerbaijan) Gabala FK)
26	FW	(Ukraine) UKR	Anton Shynder (end of loan from Shakhtar)
28	MF	(Ukraine) UKR	Serhiy Nazarenko (to Metalist)
32	DF	(Belarus) BLR	Mikhail Sivakov (to (Azerbaijan) Gabala FK)
39	DF	(Ukraine) UKR	Yevhen Opanasenko (to Zorya)
42	DF	(Ukraine) UKR	Yevhen Zubeyko (to (Russia) FC Tosno)
52	DF	(Cameroon) CMR	Adolphe Teikeu (to (Russia) FC Terek Grozny)
—	GK	(Ukraine) UKR	Andriy Hlushchenko (retired)
—	FW	(Ukraine) UKR	Artem Kulishenko (free agent)

=== Dnipro Dnipropetrovsk ===
In: Note: Flags indicate national team as defined under FIFA eligibility rules; some limited exceptions apply. Players may hold more than one non-FIFA nationality.

No.	Pos.	Nation	Player
6	DF	(Brazil) BRA	Egídio (from (Brazil) Cruzeiro)
8	MF	(Ukraine) UKR	Pavlo Ksyonz (on loan from Karpaty)
15	DF	(Ukraine) UKR	Dmytro Chyhrynskyi (from Shakhtar)
19	MF	(Ukraine) UKR	Roman Bezus (from Dynamo)
25	MF	(Ukraine) UKR	Valeriy Fedorchuk (loan return from Volyn)
—	FW	(Ukraine) UKR	Yevhen Bokhashvili (loan return from Volyn)

Out: Note: Flags indicate national team as defined under FIFA eligibility rules; some limited exceptions apply. Players may hold more than one non-FIFA nationality.

No.	Pos.	Nation	Player
8	DF	(Ukraine) UKR	Volodymyr Polyovyi (on loan to Volyn)
17	DF	(Croatia) CRO	Ivan Strinic (to (Italy) Napoli)
89	MF	(Ukraine) UKR	Serhiy Politylo (on loan to Volyn)
91	GK	(Ukraine) UKR	Ihor Vartsaba (on loan to Naftovyk-Ukrnafta)

== See also ==
- 2014-15 Ukrainian Premier League
