= List of Romanian football transfers summer 2011 =

This is a list of Romanian football transfers for the 2011–12 transfer windows. Only moves featuring at least one Liga I club are listed.

== Transfers ==
=== Summer window ===
Date	Name	Country	From/Last Club	Moving to	Fee
6 January 2011	Gabriel Matei	Romania	Pandurii	Steaua	€600,000
18 February 2011	Raul Rusescu	Romania	Unirea Urziceni	Steaua	€100,000
25 March 2011	Mihai Costea	Romania	U Craiova	Steaua	€1,400,000
5 May 2011	Laurenţiu Marinescu	Romania	Steaua	Astra	Undisclosed
6 May 2011	Dorinel Popa	Romania	Victoria Brăneşti	Steaua	€200,000
24 May 2011	Iulian Apostol	Romania	Unirea Urziceni	Rapid	End of contract
24 May 2011	Cristian Oros	Romania	Braşov	Rapid	End of contract
5 August 2011	Costel Pantilimon	Romania	Poli Timişoara	(England) Manchester City	23 mil
22 August 2011	Gabriel Torje	Romania	Dinamo Bucuresti	(Italy) Udinese	7 Mil
