= List of Lithuanian football transfers winter 2022–23 =

This is a list of transfers in Lithuanian football for the 2022—23 winter transfer window. Only confirmed moves featuring an A Lyga side are listed.

The winter transfer window opened on January 7, 2023, and will close on March 18, 2023. Deals may be signed at any given moment in the season, but the actual transfer may only take place during the transfer window. Unattached players may sign at any moment.

== Transfers In ==
Date	Name	Moving from	Moving to	Type	Source
12 December 2022	(Lithuania) Vytautas Černiauskas	(Latvia) RFS	FK Panevėžys	Free	
25 December 2022	(Colombia) Sebastián Vásquez	DFK Dainava	Panevėžys	Free	
26 December 2022	(Ukraine) Yevhen Yefremov	(Ukraine) Mynai	Sūduva	Free	
18 January 2023	(France) Billal Sebaihi	(Kazakhstan) Maktaaral	Žalgiris	Free	
31 January 2023	(Guadeloupe) Florian David	(France) Rodez	Kauno Žalgiris	Free	
31 January 2023	(Brazil) Michael Thuíque	(Israel) Bnei Yehuda	Hegelmann	Free	
31 January 2023	(Japan) Ikuto Gomi	(Latvia) Tukums	Dainava	Free	
12 February 2022	(Georgia (country)) Luka Koberidze	Marijampolė City	Riteriai	Transfer	

== Transfers Out ==
Date	Name	Moving from	Moving to	Type	Source
12 December 2022	(Ukraine) Andriy Slinkin	Jonava	Unattached		
25 December 2022	(Ukraine) Vadym Mashchenko	Jonava	(Ukraine) Dynamo Kyiv	Loan Return	
26 December 2022	(Lithuania) Mindaugas Grigaravičius	Riteriai	(Kazakhstan) FC Kaisar	Transfer	
27 December 2022	(Georgia (country)) Luka Koberidze	Riteriai	Marijampolė City	Transfer	
27 December 2022	(France) Salif Cissé	Hegelmann	(Azerbaijan) Kapaz	Transfer	
27 December 2022	(Brazil) Juninho Maranhense	Babrungas Plungė	(Azerbaijan) Kapaz	Transfer	
31 December 2022	(Brazil) Wanderson Maranhão	Panevėžys	(Ukraine) Chornomorets Odesa	Loan Return	
31 December 2022	(Brazil) Renan Oliveira	Žalgiris	(Ukraine) Kolos Kovalivka	Loan Return	
4 February 2023	(Ukraine) Danylo Kondrakov	Sūduva	(Bulgaria) Pirin	Transfer	
5 February 2023	(Israel) Tzlil Nehemia	Hegelmann	(Israel) Hapoel Nof HaGalil	Free	
6 February 2023	(Nigeria) Joshua Akpudje	FK Panevėžys	(Latvia) Daugavpils	Loan Return	
23 February 2023	(Brazil) Léo Antônio	Džiugas Telšiai	(Ukraine) Lviv	Transfer	
25 February 2023	(Bosnia and Herzegovina) Nikola Eskić	Riteriai	(Kazakhstan) Aksu	Transfer	
28 February 2022	(France) Fabien Ourega	Žalgiris	(Kazakhstan) Astana	Transfer	
3 April 2022	(Brazil) Guilherme	Marijampolė City	(Ukraine) Nyva Vinnytsia	Transfer	
