= List of Maltese football transfers winter 2022–23 =

The 2022–23 winter transfer window for Maltese football transfers opened on 1 January and closed on 31 January. Additionally, players without a club may join at any time and clubs may sign players on loan at any time. This list includes transfers featuring at least one Premier League or First Division club which were completed after the end of the summer 2022 transfer window and before the end of the 2022–23 winter window.

== Transfers ==
Date	Name	Moving from	Moving to	Fee
6 January 2023	(Ukraine) Robert Hehedosh	(Ukraine) Peremoha Dnipro	Santa Lucia	Undisclosed
11 January 2023	(Ukraine) Yevheniy Terzi	(Latvia) Super Nova	Santa Lucia	Undisclosed
21 January 2023	(Malta) Joseph Mbong	(Israel) Ironi Kiryat Shmona	Ħamrun Spartans	Loan Returned
2 February 2023	(Italy) Claudio Bonanni	(Bulgaria) Hebar	Marsaxlokk	Undisclosed
3 February 2023	(France) Vamara Sanogo	(Israel) F.C. Kafr Qasim	Marsaxlokk	Undisclosed
3 February 2023	(Chile) José Luis Gamonal	(Chile) Fernández Vial	Marsaxlokk	Undisclosed
3 February 2023	(Israel) Eden Hershkovitz	Floriana	(Israel) F.C. Kafr Qasim	Undisclosed
3 February 2023	(Malta) Kyrian Nwoko	Floriana	Saint Lucia	On Loan
3 February 2023	(Georgia (country)) Giorgi Bukhaidze	Marsa	(Kazakhstan) Kaisar	Transfer
