= List of Lithuanian football transfers winter 2017–18 =

This is a list of transfers in Lithuanian football for the 2017–18 winter transfer window. Only confirmed moves featuring an A Lyga side are listed.

The winter transfer window opens on January 1, 2018, and will close on February 25, 2018. Deals may be signed at any given moment in the season, but the actual transfer may only take place during the transfer window. Unattached players may sign at any moment.

== Transfers In ==
Date	Name	Moving from	Moving to	Type	Source
1 December 2017	(Lithuania) Saulius Klevinskas	Vilniaus Vytis	Sūduva	Free	
12 December 2017	(Lithuania) Arūnas Klimavičius	Trakai	Jonava	Free	

== Transfers Out ==
Date	Name	Moving from	Moving to	Type	Source
5 November 2017	(Lithuania) Erlandas Duršlikas	Trakai	–	Death	
9 November 2017	(Lithuania) Tomas Snapkauskas	Stumbras	Free Market	Released	
9 November 2017	(Lithuania) Lukas Artimavičius	Stumbras	Free Market	Released	
9 November 2017	(Lithuania) Klaidas Janonis	Stumbras	Free Market	Released	
9 November 2017	(Lithuania) Donatas Konikas	Stumbras	Free Market	Released	
9 November 2017	(Lithuania) Aldas Korsakas	Stumbras	Free Market	Released	
22 November 2017	(North Macedonia) Marjan Altiparmakovski	Sūduva	Free Market	Released	
22 November 2017	(Lithuania) Marius Činikas	Sūduva	Free Market	Released	
22 November 2017	(Lithuania) Karolis Chvedukas	Sūduva	Free Market	Released	
22 November 2017	(Lithuania) Deividas Šešplaukis	Sūduva	Free Market	Released	
30 November 2017	(Bosnia and Herzegovina) Bahrudin Atajić	Žalgiris	Free Market	Released	
30 November 2017	(Mali) Mahamane Traoré	Žalgiris	Free Market	Released	
30 November 2017	(Serbia) Matija Ljujić	Žalgiris	Free Market	Released	
30 November 2017	(Croatia) Kaja Rogulj	Žalgiris	Free Market	Released	
6 December 2017	(Ghana) Abdul Basit	Stumbras	(Ghana) Eleven Wonders	Undisclosed	
7 December 2017	(Lithuania) Paulius Janušauskas	Sūduva	Panevėžys	Free	

== Trials ==
Only following cases apply to this category:

- Player was on trial in A Lyga club, but haven't joined any club of the league;
- Player from the league was away in any other club for a trial, but wasn't sold, loaned out or released to another club in this transfer window.

Date	Name	Moving from	Moving to	Type	Source
17 November 2017	(Lithuania) Vilius Armalas	Stumbras	(Portugal) Braga	Trial	
27 November 2017	(Portugal) Renato Gomes	Stumbras	(Brazil) Internacional	Trial	
9 December 2017	(Lithuania) Vilius Armalas	Stumbras	(Italy) Perugia	Trial	

== Staff ==
Date	Name	Position	Moving from	Moving to	Source
8 November 2017	(Lithuania) Sergejus Slyva	President	Stumbras	Free Market	
19 November 2017	(Russia) Vladimir Tunkin	Assistant Coach	Free Market	Atlantas	
24 November 2017	(Belarus) Aleksandr Brazevich	Head coach	Žalgiris	Free Market	
27 November 2017	(Lithuania) Aurelijus Skarbalius	Head coach	Utenis	Žalgiris	
12 December 2017	(Lithuania) Andrius Skerla	Assistant Coach	Žalgiris	Free Market	
