= List of English football transfers winter 2020–21 =

The 2020–21 English football winter transfer window ran from 7 October 2020 to 2 February 2021 due to the effects of the COVID-19 pandemic on the football calendar. The domestic transfer window for the Football League was extended until 16 October. Players without a club could be signed at any time, clubs could sign players on loan dependent on their league's regulations, and clubs could sign a goalkeeper on an emergency loan if they had no registered senior goalkeeper available. This list includes transfers featuring at least one club from either the Premier League or the EFL that were completed after the end of the summer 2020 transfer window on 6 October and before the end of the 2020–21 winter window.

== Transfers ==
All players and clubs without a flag are English. Note that while Cardiff City, Swansea City and Newport County are affiliated with the Football Association of Wales and thus take the Welsh flag, they play in the Championship and League Two respectively, and so their transfers are included here.

Date	Player	Moving from	Moving to	Fee
8 October 2020	Courtney Baker-Richardson	(Wales) Swansea City	Barrow	Free
8 October 2020	(Wales) Chris Gunter	Reading	Charlton Athletic	Free
8 October 2020	Ben Liddle	Middlesbrough	Bristol Rovers	Undisclosed
9 October 2020	Omar Bogle	Unattached	Charlton Athletic	Free
9 October 2020	Cameron Jerome	Unattached	MK Dons	Free
9 October 2020	Will Keane	Unattached	Wigan Athletic	Free
9 October 2020	(Saint Kitts and Nevis) Michael Nottingham	Blackpool	Accrington Stanley	Undisclosed
10 October 2020	Joshua Bohui	(Netherlands) NAC Breda	Colchester United	Free
10 October 2020	Callum Brittain	MK Dons	Barnsley	Undisclosed
10 October 2020	(Cyprus) Nick Tsaroulla	Brentford	Crawley Town	Free
10 October 2020	Max Watters	Doncaster Rovers	Crawley Town	Free
13 October 2020	Henry Burnett	Unattached	Crawley Town	Free
13 October 2020	Ryan Inniss	Crystal Palace	Charlton Athletic	Undisclosed
14 October 2020	Nathaniel Clyne	Unattached	Crystal Palace	Free
14 October 2020	Charlie Kelman	Southend United	Queens Park Rangers	Undisclosed
15 October 2020	Ellis Chapman	Lincoln City	Cheltenham Town	Free
15 October 2020	Karlan Grant	Huddersfield Town	West Bromwich Albion	£15m
15 October 2020	(Turkey) Colin Kazim-Richards	Unattached	Derby County	Free
15 October 2020	(Wales) Joe Morrell	Bristol City	Luton Town	Undisclosed
16 October 2020	Ryan Bennett	Wolverhampton Wanderers	(Wales) Swansea City	Free
16 October 2020	Laurence Bilboe	Rotherham United	Oldham Athletic	Free
16 October 2020	Jack Butland	Stoke City	Crystal Palace	£1m
16 October 2020	Ben Coker	Lincoln City	Stevenage	Undisclosed
16 October 2020	(Australia) Kenny Dougall	Unattached	Blackpool	Free
16 October 2020	Andrew Fisher	Blackburn Rovers	MK Dons	Free
16 October 2020	Herbie Kane	Liverpool	Barnsley	£1.25m
16 October 2020	(Netherlands) Terence Kongolo	Huddersfield Town	Fulham	£4m
16 October 2020	Joel Latibeaudiere	Manchester City	(Wales) Swansea City	Undisclosed
16 October 2020	(Republic of Ireland) Ryan Manning	Queens Park Rangers	(Wales) Swansea City	Undisclosed
16 October 2020	(Belgium) Brice Ntambwe	Macclesfield Town	Oldham Athletic	Free
16 October 2020	Aynsley Pears	Middlesbrough	Blackburn Rovers	Undisclosed
16 October 2020	Dillon Phillips	Charlton Athletic	(Wales) Cardiff City	Undisclosed
16 October 2020	(Wales) Joe Rodon	(Wales) Swansea City	Tottenham Hotspur	£11m
18 October 2020	Junior Brown	Unattached	Scunthorpe United	Free
18 October 2020	(Spain) Alex Vallejo	Unattached	Huddersfield Town	Free
18 October 2020	Danny Welbeck	Unattached	Brighton & Hove Albion	Free
21 October 2020	(Scotland) Callum McFadzean	Unattached	Sunderland	Free
21 October 2020	Jordy Hiwula	Unattached	Portsmouth	Free
21 October 2020	Mark Howard	Unattached	Scunthorpe United	Free
21 October 2020	Ali Koiki	Unattached	Bristol Rovers	Free
23 October 2020	Charlie Daniels	Unattached	Shrewsbury Town	Free
26 October 2020	(France) Dimitri Sea	Unattached	Barrow	Free
27 October 2020	(Republic of Ireland) Alan Sheehan	Unattached	Northampton Town	Free
2 November 2020	Michael Folivi	Unattached	Colchester United	Free
2 November 2020	Ricky Holmes	Unattached	Northampton Town	Free
3 November 2020	(Scotland) George Boyd	Unattached	Salford City	Free
3 November 2020	Tom Pett	Unattached	Stevenage	Free
6 November 2020	(Wales) Lewis Price	Rotherham United	Unattached	Free
6 November 2020	Josh Vickers	Unattached	Rotherham United	Free
9 November 2020	Jordan Obita	Unattached	Oxford United	Free
10 November 2020	(France) Raphael Diarra	Unattached	Oldham Athletic	Free
10 November 2020	Danny Lloyd	Unattached	Tranmere Rovers	Free
11 November 2020	(Jamaica) Adrian Mariappa	Unattached	Bristol City	Free
11 November 2020	Sam Hart	Unattached	Southend United	Free
12 November 2020	Rhys Bennett	Unattached	Carlisle United	Free
17 November 2020	Andrew Surman	Unattached	MK Dons	Free
17 November 2020	Duncan Watmore	Unattached	Middlesbrough	Free
18 November 2020	Gabriel Osho	Unattached	Luton Town	Free
19 November 2020	Ben Heneghan	Unattached	AFC Wimbledon	Free
23 November 2020	(Croatia) Alen Halilovic	Unattached	Birmingham City	Free
27 November 2020	(Northern Ireland) Lee Camp	Unattached	Coventry City	Free
27 November 2020	James Clark	Unattached	Wycombe Wanderers	Free
27 November 2020	(Finland) Niki Maenpaa	Unattached	Stoke City	Free
2 December 2020	Andy Lonergan	Unattached	Stoke City	Free
11 December 2020	(Portugal) Filipe Morais	Unattached	Grimsby Town	Free
15 December 2020	Greg Halford	Unattached	Southend United	Free
26 December 2020	Louis Walsh	Unattached	Southend United	Free
30 December 2020	(France) Étienne Capoue	Watford	(Spain) Villarreal	Undisclosed
2 January 2021	(Denmark) Philip Zinckernagel	(Norway) Bodø/Glimt	Watford	Free
4 January 2021	(Turkey) Jem Karacan	Unattached	Scunthorpe United	Free
4 January 2021	Gary Roberts	(Wales) Bala Town	Accrington Stanley	Free
4 January 2021	(Denmark) Ronnie Schwartz	(Denmark) Midtjylland	Charlton Athletic	Undisclosed
5 January 2021	(Scotland) Jordan Archer	(Scotland) Motherwell	Middlesbrough	Free
5 January 2021	Liam Kitching	Forest Green Rovers	Barnsley	Undisclosed
5 January 2021	Chris Lines	Northampton Town	Stevenage	Undisclosed
5 January 2021	Luke Norris	Colchester United	Stevenage	Undisclosed
5 January 2021	(Scotland) Gavin Reilly	Carlisle United	(Scotland) Livingston	Free
6 January 2021	Carlton Morris	Norwich City	Barnsley	Undisclosed
7 January 2021	Rolando Aarons	Newcastle United	Huddersfield Town	Undisclosed
7 January 2021	Baily Cargill	MK Dons	Forest Green Rovers	Undisclosed
7 January 2021	(Ivory Coast) Amad	(Italy) Atalanta	Manchester United	£19M
7 January 2021	Kieron Freeman	Unattached	Swindon Town	Free
7 January 2021	Will Huffer	Bradford (Park Avenue)	Bradford City	Undisclosed
7 January 2021	Jay Williams	Kettering Town	Harrogate Town	Undisclosed
8 January 2021	(Wales) Jack Evans	(Wales) Swansea City	(Wales) Newport County	Free
8 January 2021	Sam Habergham	Unattached	Grimsby Town	Free
8 January 2021	(Ivory Coast) Sébastien Haller	West Ham United	(Netherlands) Ajax	£20.2M
8 January 2021	Kieran Lee	Unattached	Bolton Wanderers	Free
8 January 2021	Matt Macey	Arsenal	(Scotland) Hibernian	Free
8 January 2021	(Scotland) Robert Snodgrass	West Ham United	West Bromwich Albion	Undisclosed
8 January 2021	Josh Wright	Leyton Orient	Crawley Town	Free
8 January 2021	(Republic of the Congo) Offrande Zanzala	Unattached	Carlisle United	Free
9 January 2021	Andy Lonergan	Stoke City	West Bromwich Albion	Free
10 January 2021	(Northern Ireland) Carl Winchester	Forest Green Rovers	Sunderland	Undisclosed
11 January 2021	(Zimbabwe) Tendayi Darikwa	Nottingham Forest	Wigan Athletic	Free
11 January 2021	(Wales) Adam Roscrow	AFC Wimbledon	(Wales) The New Saints	Undisclosed
11 January 2021	Jake Taylor	Nottingham Forest	Port Vale	Undisclosed
12 January 2021	(Republic of Ireland) Niall Canavan	Plymouth Argyle	Bradford City	Undisclosed
13 January 2021	Charlie Brown	Chelsea	MK Dons	Undisclosed
13 January 2021	(Netherlands) Timothy Fosu-Mensah	Manchester United	(Germany) Bayer Leverkusen	Undisclosed
13 January 2021	Jordan Flores	(Republic of Ireland) Dundalk	Hull City	Undisclosed
13 January 2021	(Algeria) Islam Slimani	Leicester City	(France) Lyon	Free
14 January 2021	Jonathan Bond	West Bromwich Albion	(United States) LA Galaxy	Undisclosed
14 January 2021	(Iran) Saman Ghoddos	(France) Amiens	Brentford	Undisclosed
14 January 2021	Andre Green	Unattached	Sheffield Wednesday	Free
14 January 2021	(Brazil) Lucas Piazon	Chelsea	(Portugal) Braga	Undisclosed
14 January 2021	Ben Whiteman	Doncaster Rovers	Preston North End	Undisclosed
15 January 2021	David Davis	Birmingham City	Shrewsbury Town	Free
15 January 2021	Kurtis Guthrie	Bradford City	Port Vale	Undisclosed
15 January 2021	Ben Hamer	Huddersfield Town	(Wales) Swansea City	Undisclosed
15 January 2021	Dan Kemp	West Ham United	Leyton Orient	Undisclosed
15 January 2021	(Scotland) Steven Lawless	Burton Albion	(Scotland) Motherwell	Undisclosed
15 January 2021	(Antigua and Barbuda) Josh Parker	Wycombe Wanderers	Burton Albion	Free
15 January 2021	James Tilley	Grimsby Town	Crawley Town	Free
16 January 2021	Matty Foulds	Unattached	Bradford City	Free
16 January 2021	Max Watters	Crawley Town	(Wales) Cardiff City	Undisclosed
18 January 2021	Ollie Banks	Tranmere Rovers	Barrow	Undisclosed
18 January 2021	Niall Ennis	Wolverhampton Wanderers	Plymouth Argyle	Undisclosed
18 January 2021	(Republic of Ireland) Warren O'Hora	Brighton & Hove Albion	MK Dons	Undisclosed
18 January 2021	(Republic of Ireland) Simon Power	Norwich City	Harrogate Town	Undisclosed
18 January 2021	Jack Wilshere	Unattached	Bournemouth	Free
19 January 2021	(Republic of Ireland) Jamie Devitt	Blackpool	Barrow	Free
19 January 2021	Richard Keogh	MK Dons	Huddersfield Town	Undisclosed
19 January 2021	George Lapslie	Charlton Athletic	Mansfield Town	Undisclosed
19 January 2021	(Scotland) Jackson Longridge	Bradford City	(Scotland) Livingston	Free
19 January 2021	Perry Ng	Crewe Alexandra	(Wales) Cardiff City	Undisclosed
19 January 2021	(Netherlands) Mike te Wierik	Derby County	(Netherlands) Groningen	Undisclosed
20 January 2021	Morgan Feeney	Sunderland	Carlisle United	Free
20 January 2021	Tyreke Johnson	Southampton	Gillingham	Undisclosed
20 January 2021	Danny Rowe	Oldham Athletic	Bradford City	Undisclosed
20 January 2021	Cedwyn Scott	Hebburn Town	Carlisle United	Undisclosed
21 January 2021	Jacob Bancroft	Oxford City	Stevenage	Undisclosed
21 January 2021	(Cyprus) Anthony Georgiou	Tottenham Hotspur	(Cyprus) AEL Limassol	Undisclosed
21 January 2021	Sam Stubbs	Fleetwood Town	Exeter City	Free
21 January 2021	George Williams	MK Dons	Bristol Rovers	Undisclosed
22 January 2021	(Wales) Nicky Adams	Northampton Town	Oldham Athletic	Free
22 January 2021	Marcus Barnes	Unattached	Oldham Athletic	Free
22 January 2021	Zach Clough	Nottingham Forest	Wigan Athletic	Free
22 January 2021	Harry Darling	Cambridge United	MK Dons	Undisclosed
22 January 2021	Alfie Doughty	Charlton Athletic	Stoke City	Undisclosed
22 January 2021	(Spain) Tomás Mejías	Middlesbrough	(Turkey) Ankaraspor	Free
22 January 2021	(Belgium) Thibaud Verlinden	Stoke City	(Netherlands) Fortuna Sittard	Undisclosed
22 January 2021	(Republic of Ireland) Corey Whelan	Unattached	Wigan Athletic	Free
23 January 2021	Kevin Stewart	Unattached	Blackpool	Free
24 January 2021	Matt O'Riley	Fulham	MK Dons	Undisclosed
24 January 2021	(Germany) Mesut Özil	Arsenal	(Turkey) Fenerbahçe	Free
25 January 2021	John Bostock	Unattached	Doncaster Rovers	Free
25 January 2021	(United States) Duane Holmes	Derby County	Huddersfield Town	Undisclosed
25 January 2021	Sam Hutchinson	(Cyprus) Pafos	Sheffield Wednesday	Free
25 January 2021	Charlie Jolley	Wigan Athletic	Tranmere Rovers	Undisclosed
25 January 2021	(Netherlands) Maikel Kieftenbeld	Birmingham City	Millwall	Undisclosed
25 January 2021	Nathanael Ogbeta	Manchester City	Shrewsbury Town	Undisclosed
25 January 2021	Stefan Payne	Tranmere Rovers	Grimsby Town	Free
25 January 2021	(Italy) Davide Rodari	Hastings United	Crawley Town	Undisclosed
25 January 2021	Tom Scott	Manchester City	Port Vale	Undisclosed
26 January 2021	(Wales) Kyle Letheren	Chesterfield	Morecambe	Free
26 January 2021	(France) Morgan Sanson	(France) Marseille	Aston Villa	Undisclosed
28 January 2021	(Scotland) Jason Cummings	Shrewsbury Town	(Scotland) Dundee	Free
28 January 2021	(Wales) Dion Donohue	Swindon Town	Barrow	Free
28 January 2021	(Republic of Ireland) Rob Elliot	Unattached	Watford	Free
28 January 2021	(Scotland) Josh Reid	(Scotland) Ross County	Coventry City	Undisclosed
28 January 2021	Dom Telford	Plymouth Argyle	(Wales) Newport County	Undisclosed
28 January 2021	Joe Walsh	Gillingham	Queens Park Rangers	Undisclosed
29 January 2021	(Algeria) Saïd Benrahma	Brentford	West Ham United	£20M
29 January 2021	(France) Sacha Bastien	Unattached	Gillingham	Free
29 January 2021	Omar Bogle	Charlton Athletic	Doncaster Rovers	Free
29 January 2021	Priestley Farquharson	(Wales) Connah's Quay Nomads	(Wales) Newport County	Undisclosed
29 January 2021	Nathan Ferguson	Crawley Town	Southend United	Undisclosed
29 January 2021	Darnell Fisher	Preston North End	Middlesbrough	Undisclosed
29 January 2021	Tom Hamer	Oldham Athletic	Burton Albion	Undisclosed
29 January 2021	(Scotland) Ryan Hardie	Blackpool	Plymouth Argyle	Undisclosed
29 January 2021	Henri Lansbury	Aston Villa	Bristol City	Free
29 January 2021	Joe Martin	Northampton Town	Stevenage	Undisclosed
29 January 2021	(Republic of Ireland) Luke McNally	(Republic of Ireland) St Patrick's Athletic	Oxford United	Undisclosed
29 January 2021	Jordan Obita	Oxford United	Wycombe Wanderers	Undisclosed
29 January 2021	Ben Pearson	Preston North End	Bournemouth	Undisclosed
29 January 2021	Jonny Smith	Bristol City	Burton Albion	Undisclosed
30 January 2021	(Spain) Gerard Deulofeu	Watford	(Italy) Udinese	Undisclosed
30 January 2021	(Wales) Regan Poole	MK Dons	Lincoln City	Undisclosed
30 January 2021	Adam Thompson	Rotherham United	Leyton Orient	Free
31 January 2021	Corie Andrews	Kingstonian	AFC Wimbledon	Undisclosed
31 January 2021	Sam Cosgrove	(Scotland) Aberdeen	Birmingham City	Undisclosed
31 January 2021	Dan Gosling	Bournemouth	Watford	Undisclosed
31 January 2021	Demarai Gray	Leicester City	(Germany) Bayer Leverkusen	Undisclosed
31 January 2021	(Scotland) Ross Stewart	(Scotland) Ross County	Sunderland	Undisclosed
1 February 2021	Elijah Adebayo	Walsall	Lincoln City	Undisclosed
1 February 2021	Dior Angus	Barrow	(Wales) Wrexham	Free
1 February 2021	Cohen Bramall	Colchester United	Lincoln City	Undisclosed
1 February 2021	(Ecuador) Moisés Caicedo	(Ecuador) Independiente del Valle	Brighton & Hove Albion	£4m
1 February 2021	Max Clark	(Netherlands) Vitesse	Hull City	Free
1 February 2021	Ollie Crankshaw	Wigan Athletic	Bradford City	Undisclosed
1 February 2021	Ben Davies	Preston North End	Liverpool	£2m
1 February 2021	George Evans	Derby County	Millwall	Undisclosed
1 February 2021	(Wales) Kieron Freeman	Swindon Town	(Wales) Swansea City	Undisclosed
1 February 2021	(Scotland) Charlie Gilmour	Norwich City	(Scotland) St. Johnstone	Undisclosed
1 February 2021	(Republic of Ireland) Conor Grant	Sheffield Wednesday	Rochdale	Undisclosed
1 February 2021	(Spain) Miguel Ángel Guerrero	Nottingham Forest	(Spain) Rayo Vallecano	Undisclosed
1 February 2021	Diallang Jaiyesimi	Swindon Town	Charlton Athletic	Undisclosed
1 February 2021	(Scotland) Zak Jules	Walsall	MK Dons	Undisclosed
1 February 2021	(Norway) Joshua King	Bournemouth	Everton	Nominal
1 February 2021	Lenell John-Lewis	Hereford	Grimsby Town	Undisclosed
1 February 2021	Jayson Leutwiler	Fleetwood Town	Huddersfield Town	Free
1 February 2021	(Denmark) Jonas Lössl	Everton	(Denmark) Midtjylland	Undisclosed
1 February 2021	(Scotland) Calum Macdonald	Blackpool	Tranmere Rovers	Undisclosed
1 February 2021	Curtis Main	(Scotland) Aberdeen	Shrewsbury Town	Free
1 February 2021	Jacob Mellis	Gillingham	Southend United	Undisclosed
1 February 2021	Nathaniel Mendez-Laing	Unattached	Middlesbrough	Free
1 February 2021	(Republic of the Congo) Christopher Missilou	Northampton Town	Swindon Town	Undisclosed
1 February 2021	(Northern Ireland) David Morgan	Southport	Accrington Stanley	Undisclosed
1 February 2021	Glenn Murray	Brighton & Hove Albion	Nottingham Forest	Free
1 February 2021	(Germany) Shkodran Mustafi	Arsenal	(Germany) Schalke 04	Free
1 February 2021	Mikael Ndjoli	Bournemouth	Barrow	Free
1 February 2021	(Norway) Ørjan Nyland	Unattached	Norwich City	Free
1 February 2021	Harry Pickering	Crewe Alexandra	Blackburn Rovers	Undisclosed
1 February 2021	Regan Riley	Bolton Wanderers	Norwich City	Undisclosed
1 February 2021	Max Sanders	Brighton & Hove Albion	Lincoln City	Undisclosed
1 February 2021	(Republic of Ireland) Conor Shaughnessy	Leeds United	Rochdale	Free
1 February 2021	Keyendrah Simmonds	Manchester City	Birmingham City	Undisclosed
1 February 2021	Jack Simpson	Bournemouth	(Scotland) Rangers	Undisclosed
1 February 2021	George Taft	Bolton Wanderers	Scunthorpe United	Free
1 February 2021	(Portugal) Fábio Tavares	Rochdale	Coventry City	Undisclosed
1 February 2021	(Wales) Terry Taylor	Wolverhampton Wanderers	Burton Albion	Undisclosed
1 February 2021	Charles Vernam	Burton Albion	Bradford City	Undisclosed
1 February 2021	Morgan Whittaker	Derby County	(Wales) Swansea City	£700k
1 February 2021	(Wales) Jonny Williams	Charlton Athletic	(Wales) Cardiff City	Undisclosed
1 February 2021	(Wales) MJ Williams	Blackpool	Bolton Wanderers	Undisclosed
1 February 2021	Brendan Wiredu	Charlton Athletic	Colchester United	Undisclosed
1 February 2021	(United States) DeAndre Yedlin	Newcastle United	(Turkey) Galatasaray	Undisclosed
2 February 2021	(Argentina) Marcos Rojo	Manchester United	(Argentina) Boca Juniors	Undisclosed
8 February 2021	(Sweden) Joel Asoro	(Wales) Swansea City	(Sweden) Djurgården	Undisclosed
8 February 2021	(Wales) Ched Evans	Fleetwood Town	Preston North End	Undisclosed
8 February 2021	Shayon Harrison	(Netherlands) Almere City	AFC Wimbledon	Free
9 February 2021	(Ghana) Joe Dodoo	(Turkey) Ankara Keçiörengücü	Wigan Athletic	Free
9 February 2021	Michael Mancienne	(United States) New England Revolution	Burton Albion	Undisclosed
11 February 2021	Morgan Ferrier	Tranmere Rovers	(Israel) Maccabi Petah Tikva	Undisclosed
11 February 2021	(Morocco) Achraf Lazaar	Newcastle United	Watford	Free
12 February 2021	Giles Coke	Hereford	Grimsby Town	Free
13 February 2021	(Spain) Angeliño	Manchester City	(Germany) RB Leipzig	Undisclosed
13 February 2021	Danny Rowe	Unattached	Burton Albion	Free
18 February 2021	Ricky Holmes	Northampton Town	Southend United	Free
18 February 2021	Nile Ranger	Unattached	Southend United	Free
20 February 2021	(Cameroon) Mike Fondop	Free Agent	Burton Albion	Free
26 February 2021	Abraham Odoh	Unattached	Rochdale	Free
26 February 2021	Jake Wright	Unattached	Mansfield Town	Free
1 March 2021	Josh McEachran	Unattached	MK Dons	Free
4 March 2021	(Colombia) Carlos Sánchez	Unattached	Watford	Free
5 March 2021	(Republic of Ireland) Derrick Williams	Blackburn Rovers	(United States) LA Galaxy	Free

== Loans ==
Start date	End date	Name	Moving from	Moving to
7 October 2020	30 June 2021	(Switzerland) Timm Klose	Norwich City	(Switzerland) Basel
8 October 2020	30 June 2021	Kyle Bennett	Bristol Rovers	Grimsby Town
8 October 2020	5 January 2021	Tolaji Bola	Arsenal	Rochdale
8 October 2020	31 January 2021	(North Macedonia) Dejan Iliev	Arsenal	Shrewsbury Town
8 October 2020	30 June 2021	Owen Windsor	West Bromwich Albion	Grimsby Town
9 October 2020	30 June 2021	Nathan Baxter	Chelsea	Accrington Stanley
9 October 2020	5 January 2021	Hiram Boateng	MK Dons	Cambridge United
9 October 2020	5 January 2021	Mitch Clark	Leicester City	Port Vale
9 October 2020	5 January 2021	Sam Hughes	Leicester City	Burton Albion
9 October 2020	4 January 2021	Kazaiah Sterling	Tottenham Hotspur	Southend United
10 October 2020	30 June 2021	Austin Samuels	Wolverhampton Wanderers	Bradford City
12 October 2020	30 June 2021	Craig Dawson	Watford	West Ham United
12 October 2020	30 June 2021	Patrick Roberts	Manchester City	Middlesbrough
13 October 2020	30 June 2021	(Netherlands) Ian Maatsen	Chelsea	Charlton Athletic
14 October 2020	30 June 2021	Jack Young	Newcastle United	Tranmere Rovers
15 October 2020	30 June 2021	Tom Edwards	Stoke City	Fleetwood Town
15 October 2020	30 June 2021	Robbie Gotts	Leeds United	Lincoln City
15 October 2020	30 June 2021	(Netherlands) Florian Jozefzoon	Derby County	Rotherham United
15 October 2020	30 June 2021	(Republic of Ireland) Peter Kioso	Luton Town	Bolton Wanderers
15 October 2020	30 June 2021	George Lapslie	Charlton Athletic	Mansfield Town
15 October 2020	30 June 2021	(Nigeria) Victor Moses	Chelsea	(Russia) Spartak Moscow
15 October 2020	30 June 2021	Erhun Oztumer	Charlton Athletic	Bristol Rovers
15 October 2020	5 January 2021	Curtis Tilt	Rotherham United	Wigan Athletic
16 October 2020	5 January 2021	Timmy Abraham	Fulham	Plymouth Argyle
16 October 2020	5 January 2021	Odin Bailey	Birmingham City	Forest Green Rovers
16 October 2020	30 June 2021	(Croatia) Filip Benkovic	Leicester City	(Wales) Cardiff City
16 October 2020	30 June 2021	(Algeria) Said Benrahma	Brentford	West Ham United
16 October 2020	5 January 2021	Di'Shon Bernard	Manchester United	Salford City
16 October 2020	30 June 2021	(United States) Cameron Carter-Vickers	Tottenham Hotspur	Bournemouth
16 October 2020	20 January 2021	Harry Clarke	Arsenal	Oldham Athletic
16 October 2020	30 June 2021	Jake Clarke-Salter	Chelsea	Birmingham City
16 October 2020	30 June 2021	Callum Connolly	Everton	Fleetwood Town
16 October 2020	5 January 2021	(Republic of Ireland) Jamie Devitt	Blackpool	(Wales) Newport County
16 October 2020	30 June 2021	Kiernan Dewsbury-Hall	Leicester City	Luton Town
16 October 2020	30 June 2021	(Scotland) Barry Douglas	Leeds United	Blackburn Rovers
16 October 2020	30 June 2021	Harvey Elliott	Liverpool	Blackburn Rovers
16 October 2020	30 June 2021	Niall Ennis	Wolverhampton Wanderers	Burton Albion
16 October 2020	30 June 2021	Aden Flint	(Wales) Cardiff City	Sheffield Wednesday
16 October 2020	30 June 2021	Adan George	Birmingham City	Walsall
16 October 2020	30 June 2021	Virgil Gomis	Nottingham Forest	Grimsby Town
16 October 2020	30 June 2021	Angus Gunn	Southampton	Stoke City
16 October 2020	30 June 2021	Jake Hesketh	Southampton	Crawley Town
16 October 2020	5 January 2021	Matty James	Leicester City	Barnsley
16 October 2020	7 January 2021	(France) Anthony Knockaert	Fulham	Nottingham Forest
16 October 2020	2 January 2021	(Wales) Aaron Lewis	Lincoln City	(Wales) Newport County
16 October 2020	30 June 2021	Jack Marriott	Derby County	Sheffield Wednesday
16 October 2020	30 June 2021	(Scotland) Charlie Mulgrew	Blackburn Rovers	Fleetwood Town
16 October 2020	30 June 2021	Sam Nombe	MK Dons	Luton Town
16 October 2020	5 January 2021	Micah Obiero	Huddersfield Town	Carlisle United
16 October 2020	30 June 2021	Aramide Oteh	Queens Park Rangers	Stevenage
16 October 2020	30 June 2021	Kasey Palmer	Bristol City	(Wales) Swansea City
16 October 2020	4 January 2021	Matty Palmer	Swindon Town	Wigan Athletic
16 October 2020	17 January 2021	Jamie Proctor	Rotherham United	(Wales) Newport County
16 October 2020	5 January 2021	Jayden Reid	Birmingham City	Barrow
16 October 2020	30 June 2021	Dion Sanderson	Wolverhampton Wanderers	Sunderland
16 October 2020	30 June 2021	Jake Scrimshaw	Bournemouth	Walsall
16 October 2020	30 June 2021	(Scotland) Andrew Shinnie	Luton Town	Charlton Athletic
16 October 2020	30 June 2021	(Republic of Ireland) Olamide Shodipo	Queens Park Rangers	Oxford United
16 October 2020	16 January 2021	Josh Sims	Southampton	Doncaster Rovers
16 October 2020	30 June 2021	(Wales) Matt Smith	Manchester City	Doncaster Rovers
16 October 2020	7 January 2021	Sam Smith	Reading	Tranmere Rovers
16 October 2020	30 June 2021	(Northern Ireland) Paul Smyth	Queens Park Rangers	Charlton Athletic
16 October 2020	30 June 2021	(Germany) Tom Trybull	Norwich City	Blackburn Rovers
16 October 2020	30 June 2021	Stephen Walker	Middlesbrough	MK Dons
16 October 2020	30 June 2021	(Wales) Harry Wilson	Liverpool	(Wales) Cardiff City
16 October 2020	5 January 2021	(Wales) Ben Woodburn	Liverpool	Blackpool
16 October 2020	5 January 2021	(Denmark) Kenneth Zohore	West Bromwich Albion	Millwall
17 October 2020	17 January 2021	James Olayinka	Arsenal	Southend United
20 October 2020	30 June 2021	Haydon Roberts	Brighton & Hove Albion	Rochdale
25 October 2020	30 June 2021	(Egypt) Ahmed Hegazi	West Bromwich Albion	(Saudi Arabia) Al-Ittihad
27 October 2020	4 November 2020	(Iceland) Jokull Andresson	Reading	Exeter City
30 October 2020	6 November 2020	Joe Lumley	Queens Park Rangers	Gillingham
20 November 2020	27 November 2020	Joe Lumley	Queens Park Rangers	Doncaster Rovers
24 December 2020	31 December 2020	Sam Walker	Reading	Blackpool
31 December 2020	30 June 2021	Harry Chapman	Blackburn Rovers	Shrewsbury Town
31 December 2020	30 June 2021	(Bosnia and Herzegovina) Sead Kolašinac	Arsenal	(Germany) Schalke 04
31 December 2020	30 June 2021	Matthew Pennington	Everton	Shrewsbury Town
4 January 2021	30 June 2021	Joe Day	(Wales) Cardiff City	Bristol Rovers
4 January 2021	30 June 2021	Morgan Rogers	Manchester City	Lincoln City
4 January 2021	30 June 2021	Dominic Thompson	Brentford	Swindon Town
4 January 2021	30 June 2021	(France) William Saliba	Arsenal	(France) Nice
5 January 2021	30 June 2021	Josh March	Forest Green Rovers	Harrogate Town
5 January 2021	30 June 2021	(Canada) Liam Millar	Liverpool	Charlton Athletic
5 January 2021	30 June 2021	(Republic of Ireland) Jayson Molumby	Brighton & Hove Albion	Preston North End
5 January 2021	30 June 2021	(Zimbabwe) Admiral Muskwe	Leicester City	Wycombe Wanderers
5 January 2021	30 June 2021	Matty Stevens	Forest Green Rovers	Stevenage
5 January 2021	30 June 2021	(Austria) Dejan Stojanović	Middlesbrough	(Germany) FC St. Pauli
5 January 2021	30 June 2021	(Portugal) Rúben Vinagre	Wolverhampton Wanderers	(Portugal) Famalicão
5 January 2021	30 June 2021	Owen Windsor	West Bromwich Albion	(Wales) Newport County
6 January 2021	30 June 2021	Ellery Balcombe	Brentford	Doncaster Rovers
6 January 2021	30 June 2021	Hayden Carter	Blackburn Rovers	Burton Albion
6 January 2021	30 June 2021	(Wales) Ched Evans	Fleetwood Town	Preston North End
6 January 2021	30 June 2021	(Republic of Ireland) William Hondermarck	Norwich City	Harrogate Town
6 January 2021	30 June 2021	Matty James	Leicester City	Coventry City
6 January 2021	30 June 2021	(Scotland) Liam Kelly	Queens Park Rangers	(Scotland) Motherwell
6 January 2021	30 June 2021	(Northern Ireland) Brad Lyons	Blackburn Rovers	Morecambe
6 January 2021	30 June 2021	Jubril Okedina	Tottenham Hotspur	Cambridge United
6 January 2021	30 June 2021	(Portugal) Elliot Simões	Barnsley	Doncaster Rovers
6 January 2021	30 June 2021	(Republic of Ireland) Mark Travers	Bournemouth	Swindon Town
7 January 2021	30 June 2021	Reeco Hackett-Fairchild	Portsmouth	Southend United
7 January 2021	30 June 2021	(Denmark) Daniel Iversen	Leicester City	Preston North End
7 January 2021	30 June 2021	(Wales) Declan John	(Wales) Swansea City	Bolton Wanderers
7 January 2021	30 June 2021	(Wales) Rabbi Matondo	(Germany) Schalke 04	Stoke City
7 January 2021	30 June 2021	(Republic of Ireland) Corrie Ndaba	Ipswich Town	(Scotland) Ayr United
7 January 2021	30 June 2021	George Taft	Bolton Wanderers	Scunthorpe United
8 January 2021	30 June 2021	Tyreke Johnson	Southampton	Gillingham
8 January 2021	30 June 2021	Ethan Laird	Manchester United	MK Dons
8 January 2021	30 June 2021	(Scotland) Josh McPake	(Scotland) Rangers	Harrogate Town
8 January 2021	30 June 2021	Mitchell Roberts	Birmingham City	Harrogate Town
8 January 2021	30 June 2021	Jake Scrimshaw	Bournemouth	(Wales) Newport County
8 January 2021	30 June 2021	Jordan Stevens	Leeds United	Bradford City
9 January 2021	30 June 2021	Charlie Austin	West Bromwich Albion	Queens Park Rangers
11 January 2021	30 June 2022	(Denmark) Oskar Buur	Wolverhampton Wanderers	(Switzerland) Grasshopper
11 January 2021	30 June 2021	Isaac Hutchinson	Derby County	Forest Green Rovers
11 January 2021	30 June 2021	Sam Walker	Reading	AFC Wimbledon
12 January 2021	30 June 2021	(Croatia) Filip Benković	Leicester City	(Belgium) OH Leuven
12 January 2021	30 June 2021	Sean Clare	Oxford United	Burton Albion
12 January 2021	19 January 2021	Joe Hilton	Blackburn Rovers	Fleetwood Town
12 January 2021	30 June 2021	(Wales) Rhys Norrington-Davies	Sheffield United	Stoke City
13 January 2021	30 June 2021	(Germany) Marcel Hilßner	Coventry City	Oldham Athletic
13 January 2021	30 June 2021	(Republic of Ireland) Tyreik Wright	Aston Villa	Walsall
14 January 2021	30 June 2021	Jarrad Branthwaite	Everton	Blackburn Rovers
14 January 2021	30 June 2021	Rumarn Burrell	Middlesbrough	Bradford City
14 January 2021	30 June 2021	Jack Clarke	Tottenham Hotspur	Stoke City
14 January 2021	30 June 2021	(Wales) Neal Eardley	Burton Albion	Barrow
14 January 2021	30 June 2021	Ryan Edmondson	Leeds United	Northampton Town
14 January 2021	30 June 2021	Adam Lewis	Liverpool	Plymouth Argyle
14 January 2021	30 June 2021	Mikel Miller	Rotherham United	Northampton Town
14 January 2021	30 June 2021	Callum Slattery	Southampton	Gillingham
14 January 2021	30 June 2021	(Northern Ireland) Gavin Whyte	(Wales) Cardiff City	Hull City
14 January 2021	30 June 2021	(Netherlands) Jordy de Wijs	Hull City	Queens Park Rangers
15 January 2021	30 June 2021	Robbie Gotts	Leeds United	Salford City
15 January 2021	30 June 2021	(Sweden) Viktor Gyökeres	Brighton & Hove Albion	Coventry City
15 January 2021	30 June 2021	Olly Lee	(Scotland) Heart of Midlothian	Gillingham
15 January 2021	30 June 2021	(Republic of Ireland) Stephen Quinn	Burton Albion	Mansfield Town
15 January 2021	30 June 2021	Kyle Vassell	Rotherham United	Fleetwood Town
16 January 2021	30 June 2021	(Republic of Ireland) Zack Elbouzedi	Lincoln City	Bolton Wanderers
16 January 2021	30 June 2021	Ben Jackson	Huddersfield Town	Bolton Wanderers
18 January 2021	30 June 2021	Dillon Barnes	Queens Park Rangers	Burton Albion
18 January 2021	30 June 2021	(Scotland) Daniel Bramall]	Barnsley	Barrow
18 January 2021	30 June 2021	Daniel Crowley	Birmingham City	Hull City
18 January 2021	30 June 2021	Tom Davies	Bristol Rovers	Barrow
18 January 2021	30 June 2021	Danny Drinkwater	Chelsea	(Turkey) Kasımpaşa
18 January 2021	30 June 2021	Nick Freeman	Wycombe Wanderers	Leyton Orient
18 January 2021	30 June 2021	(Wales) Tom James	(Scotland) Hibernian	Salford City
18 January 2021	30 June 2021	Jordan Maguire-Drew	Leyton Orient	Crawley Town
18 January 2021	30 June 2021	(Wales) Rollin Menayese	Mansfield Town	Grimsby Town
18 January 2021	30 June 2021	Bryn Morris	Portsmouth	Northampton Town
18 January 2021	30 June 2021	Harvey White	Tottenham Hotspur	Portsmouth
19 January 2021	30 June 2021	(Brazil) Bernardo	Brighton & Hove Albion	(Austria) Red Bull Salzburg
19 January 2021	30 June 2021	Josh Davison	Charlton Athletic	Forest Green Rovers
19 January 2021	30 June 2021	(Greece) Dimitris Giannoulis	(Greece) PAOK	Norwich City
19 January 2021	30 June 2021	(Republic of Ireland) Conor Masterson	Queens Park Rangers	Swindon Town
19 January 2021	30 June 2021	Aramide Oteh	Queens Park Rangers	Colchester United
19 January 2021	30 June 2021	Jayden Reid	Birmingham City	Walsall
19 January 2021	30 June 2021	Luke Thomas	Barnsley	Ipswich Town
20 January 2021	30 June 2021	Luke Gambin	Colchester United	(Wales) Newport County
20 January 2021	30 June 2021	Josh Harrop	Preston North End	Ipswich Town
20 January 2021	30 June 2021	Ellis Simms	Everton	Blackpool
20 January 2021	30 June 2021	Frank Vincent	Bournemouth	Walsall
21 January 2021	30 June 2021	(Scotland) Paul Coutts	Fleetwood Town	Salford City
21 January 2021	30 June 2021	Rekeem Harper	West Bromwich Albion	Birmingham City
21 January 2021	30 June 2021	Jay Matete	Fleetwood Town	Grimsby Town
21 January 2021	30 June 2021	(France) Jean-Philippe Mateta	(Germany) Mainz	Crystal Palace
22 January 2021	29 January 2021	(Iceland) Jökull Andrésson	Reading	Morecambe
22 January 2021	30 June 2021	George Dobson	Sunderland	AFC Wimbledon
22 January 2021	30 June 2021	(Saint Lucia) Janoi Donacien	Ipswich Town	Fleetwood Town
22 January 2021	30 June 2021	(Scotland) George Johnston	(Netherlands) Feyenoord	Wigan Athletic
22 January 2021	30 June 2021	Billy Jones	Rotherham United	Crewe Alexandra
22 January 2021	30 June 2021	Nya Kirby	Crystal Palace	Tranmere Rovers
22 January 2021	30 June 2021	(Croatia) Filip Krovinović	(Portugal) Benfica	Nottingham Forest
22 January 2021	30 June 2021	(United States) Jordan Morris	(United States) Seattle Sounders	(Wales) Swansea City
22 January 2021	30 June 2021	(Australia) Mathew Ryan	Brighton & Hove Albion	Arsenal
22 January 2021	30 June 2021	Harry Smith	Northampton Town	(Scotland) Motherwell
22 January 2021	30 June 2021	Jayden Stockley	Preston North End	Charlton Athletic
22 January 2021	30 June 2021	Bobby Thomas	Burnley	Barrow
22 January 2021	30 June 2021	Fikayo Tomori	Chelsea	(Italy) Milan
22 January 2021	30 June 2021	Stephen Walker	Middlesbrough	Crewe Alexandra
23 January 2021	30 June 2021	(Scotland) George Byers	(Wales) Swansea City	Portsmouth
23 January 2021	30 June 2021	Antony Evans	(Germany) SC Paderborn	Crewe Alexandra
23 January 2021	30 June 2021	(Brazil) Willian José	(Spain) Real Sociedad	Wolverhampton Wanderers
25 January 2021	30 June 2021	Tyler Cordner	Bournemouth	Southend United
25 January 2021	30 June 2021	Robbie Cundy	Bristol City	Gillingham
25 January 2021	30 June 2021	(Turkey) Halil Dervişoğlu	Brentford	(Turkey) Galatasaray
25 January 2021	30 June 2021	Anthony Hartigan	AFC Wimbledon	(Wales) Newport County
25 January 2021	30 June 2021	Darnell Johnson	Leicester City	AFC Wimbledon
25 January 2021	30 June 2021	(Republic of Ireland) Peter Kioso	Luton Town	Northampton Town
25 January 2021	30 June 2021	(Belgium) Tyrese Omotoye	Norwich City	Swindon Town
25 January 2021	30 June 2021	Shilow Tracey	Tottenham Hotspur	Cambridge United
26 January 2021	30 June 2021	Ryan Giles	Wolverhampton Wanderers	Rotherham United
26 January 2021	30 June 2021	(Norway) Stefan Johansen	Fulham	Queens Park Rangers
27 January 2021	30 June 2021	Andy Cook	Mansfield Town	Bradford City
27 January 2021	31 December 2021	Tom Edwards	Stoke City	(United States) New York Red Bulls
27 January 2021	30 June 2021	Joe Hilton	Blackburn Rovers	(Scotland) Ross County
27 January 2021	30 June 2021	(Norway) Martin Ødegaard	(Spain) Real Madrid	Arsenal
27 January 2021	30 June 2021	Josh Sims	Southampton	Doncaster Rovers
28 January 2021	30 June 2021	(Democratic Republic of the Congo) Yannick Bolasie	Everton	Middlesbrough
28 January 2021	30 June 2021	(Republic of Ireland) Greg Cunningham	(Wales) Cardiff City	Preston North End
28 January 2021	30 June 2021	Malachi Fagan-Walcott	Tottenham Hotspur	(Scotland) Dundee
28 January 2021	30 June 2021	(Belgium) Funso Ojo	(Scotland) Aberdeen	Wigan Athletic
28 January 2021	30 June 2021	(Northern Ireland) Paul Smyth	Queens Park Rangers	Accrington Stanley
28 January 2021	30 June 2021	Lewis Ward	Exeter City	Portsmouth
29 January 2021	30 June 2021	Timmy Abraham	Fulham	(Scotland) Raith Rovers
29 January 2021	30 June 2021	(Senegal) Mbaye Diagne	(Turkey) Galatasaray	West Bromwich Albion
29 January 2021	30 June 2021	(Iceland) Jökull Andrésson	Reading	Exeter City
29 January 2021	30 June 2021	(Wales) Isaac Christie-Davies	Barnsley	(Slovakia) FC DAC 1904
29 January 2021	30 June 2021	(Tunisia) Idris El Mizouni	Ipswich Town	Grimsby Town
29 January 2021	30 June 2021	Isaiah Jones	Middlesbrough	(Scotland) Queen of the South
29 January 2021	30 June 2021	(Northern Ireland) Jordan Jones	(Scotland) Rangers	Sunderland
29 January 2021	30 June 2021	Jesse Lingard	Manchester United	West Ham United
29 January 2021	30 June 2021	Sam Smith	Reading	Cheltenham Town
29 January 2021	30 June 2021	(United States) Indiana Vassilev	Aston Villa	Cheltenham Town
29 January 2021	30 June 2021	Jake Vokins	Southampton	Sunderland
30 January 2021	30 June 2021	(Netherlands) Tahith Chong	Manchester United	(Belgium) Club Brugge
30 January 2021	30 June 2021	James Garner	Manchester United	Nottingham Forest
30 January 2021	30 June 2021	(Ghana) Baba Rahman	Chelsea	(Greece) PAOK
30 January 2021	30 June 2021	(Scotland) Scott Robertson	(Scotland) Celtic	Doncaster Rovers
30 January 2021	30 June 2021	(Ivory Coast) Jean Michaël Seri	Fulham	(France) Bordeaux
30 January 2021	30 June 2021	Curtis Tilt	Rotherham United	Wigan Athletic
31 January 2021	30 June 2021	(Italy) Patrick Cutrone	Wolverhampton Wanderers	(Spain) Valencia
31 January 2021	30 June 2021	(France) Frédéric Guilbert	Aston Villa	(France) Strasbourg
31 January 2021	30 June 2021	(Uruguay) Facundo Pellistri	Manchester United	(Spain) Alavés
31 January 2021	30 June 2021	Sam Woods	Crystal Palace	Plymouth Argyle
1 February 2021	30 June 2021	(Wales) Joe Adams	Brentford	Grimsby Town
1 February 2021	30 June 2021	Tristan Abrahams	(Wales) Newport County	Leyton Orient
1 February 2021	30 June 2021	Oladapo Afolayan	West Ham United	Bolton Wanderers
1 February 2021	30 June 2021	Aji Alese	West Ham United	Cambridge United
1 February 2021	30 June 2021	Josh Andrews	Birmingham City	Harrogate Town
1 February 2021	30 June 2021	(United States) Paul Arriola	(United States) D.C. United	(Wales) Swansea City
1 February 2021	30 June 2021	(Democratic Republic of the Congo) Beni Baningime	Everton	Derby County
1 February 2021	30 June 2021	Brandon Barker	(Scotland) Rangers	Oxford United
1 February 2021	30 June 2021	(Wales) Ryan Broom	Peterborough United	Burton Albion
1 February 2021	30 June 2021	(Scotland) Ali Crawford	Bolton Wanderers	Tranmere Rovers
1 February 2021	30 June 2021	Alex Denny	Salford City	Morecambe
1 February 2021	30 June 2021	(United States) Daryl Dike	(United States) Orlando City	Barnsley
1 February 2021	30 June 2021	(Northern Ireland) Josh Doherty	Crawley Town	Colchester United
1 February 2021	30 June 2021	Declan Drysdale	Coventry City	Cambridge United
1 February 2021	30 June 2021	Josh Earl	Preston North End	Burton Albion
1 February 2021	30 June 2021	Jake Eastwood	Sheffield United	Grimsby Town
1 February 2021	30 June 2021	George Edmundson	(Scotland) Rangers	Derby County
1 February 2021	30 June 2021	Elliot Embleton	Sunderland	Blackpool
1 February 2021	30 June 2021	(Spain) Miguel Fernández	Birmingham City	(Spain) Guijuelo
1 February 2021	30 June 2021	Sam Field	West Bromwich Albion	Queens Park Rangers
1 February 2021	30 June 2021	(Jamaica) Jordon Garrick	(Wales) Swansea City	Swindon Town
1 February 2021	30 June 2021	(Germany) Robert Glatzel	(Wales) Cardiff City	(Germany) Mainz 05
1 February 2021	30 June 2021	Joe Grayson	Blackburn Rovers	Oxford United
1 February 2021	30 June 2021	Lee Gregory	Stoke City	Derby County
1 February 2021	30 June 2021	Anthony Gordon	Everton	Preston North End
1 February 2021	30 June 2021	(Northern Ireland) Will Grigg	Sunderland	MK Dons
1 February 2021	30 June 2021	Taylor Harwood-Bellis	Manchester City	Blackburn Rovers
1 February 2021	30 June 2021	Jahmal Hector-Ingram	Derby County	Stevenage
1 February 2021	30 June 2021	Teddy Howe	Blackpool	Cambridge United
1 February 2021	30 June 2021	Tom Ince	Stoke City	Luton Town
1 February 2021	30 June 2021	(Denmark) Lukas Jensen	Burnley	Bolton Wanderers
1 February 2021	30 June 2021	(Turkey) Ozan Kabak	(Germany) Schalke 04	Liverpool
1 February 2021	30 June 2021	(Democratic Republic of the Congo) Neeskens Kebano	Fulham	Middlesbrough
1 February 2021	30 June 2021	Jonjoe Kenny	Everton	(Scotland) Celtic
1 February 2021	30 June 2021	(France) Maxime Le Marchand	Fulham	(Belgium) Antwerp
1 February 2021	30 June 2021	Elliot Lee	Luton Town	Oxford United
1 February 2021	30 June 2021	(Scotland) Liam Lindsay	Stoke City	Preston North End
1 February 2021	30 June 2021	(Republic of Ireland) Shane Long	Southampton	Bournemouth
1 February 2021	30 June 2021	Marcus Maddison	Charlton Athletic	Bolton Wanderers
1 February 2021	30 June 2021	Ainsley Maitland-Niles	Arsenal	West Bromwich Albion
1 February 2021	30 June 2021	(Nigeria) Josh Maja	(France) Bordeaux	Fulham
1 February 2021	30 June 2021	Luke Matheson	Wolverhampton Wanderers	Ipswich Town
1 February 2021	30 June 2021	Nicky Maynard	Mansfield Town	(Wales) Newport County
1 February 2021	30 June 2021	Zech Medley	Arsenal	(Scotland) Kilmarnock
1 February 2021	30 June 2021	Max Melbourne	Lincoln City	Walsall
1 February 2021	30 June 2021	Teden Mengi	Manchester United	Derby County
1 February 2021	30 June 2021	(Japan) Takumi Minamino	Liverpool	Southampton
1 February 2021	30 June 2021	James Morton	Bristol City	Gillingham
1 February 2021	30 June 2021	Frank Nouble	Plymouth Argyle	Colchester United
1 February 2021	30 June 2021	David Nugent	Preston North End	Tranmere Rovers
1 February 2021	30 June 2021	(Nigeria) Nnamdi Ofoborh	Bournemouth	Wycombe Wanderers
1 February 2021	30 June 2021	Mustapha Olagunju	Huddersfield Town	Port Vale
1 February 2021	30 June 2021	(France) Derick Osei	Oxford United	Walsall
1 February 2021	30 June 2021	Jamie Pardington	Wolverhampton Wanderers	Mansfield Town
1 February 2021	30 June 2021	(Republic of Ireland) Troy Parrott	Tottenham Hotspur	Ipswich Town
1 February 2021	30 June 2021	Adam Phillips	Burnley	Accrington Stanley
1 February 2021	30 June 2021	Brandon Pierrick	Crystal Palace	(Scotland) Kilmarnock
1 February 2021	30 June 2021	Jamie Proctor	Rotherham United	Wigan Athletic
1 February 2021	30 June 2021	(Portugal) Domingos Quina	Watford	(Spain) Granada
1 February 2021	30 June 2021	(New Zealand) Winston Reid	West Ham United	Brentford
1 February 2021	30 June 2021	Patrick Roberts	Manchester City	Derby County
1 February 2021	30 June 2021	(Cyprus) Jack Roles	Tottenham Hotspur	Stevenage
1 February 2021	30 June 2021	(Norway) Martin Samuelsen	Hull City	(Denmark) Aalborg BK
1 February 2021	30 June 2021	(Montenegro) Oliver Sarkic	Blackpool	Mansfield Town
1 February 2021	30 June 2021	Matt Smith	Arsenal	Charlton Athletic
1 February 2021	30 June 2021	Will Swan	Nottingham Forest	Port Vale
1 February 2021	30 June 2021	(Azerbaijan) Serhat Tasdemir	Peterborough United	Oldham Athletic
1 February 2021	30 June 2021	(Turkey) Cenk Tosun	Everton	(Turkey) Beşiktaş
1 February 2021	30 June 2021	(Wales) Jack Vale	Blackburn Rovers	Rochdale
1 February 2021	30 June 2021	(France) Yan Valery	Southampton	Birmingham City
1 February 2021	30 June 2021	(Netherlands) Sepp van den Berg	Liverpool	Preston North End
1 February 2021	30 June 2021	Robbie Willmott	(Wales) Newport County	Exeter City
1 February 2021	30 June 2021	Joe Willock	Arsenal	Newcastle United
1 February 2021	30 June 2021	Lewis Wing	Middlesbrough	Rotherham United
1 February 2021	30 June 2021	Nathan Wood	Middlesbrough	Crewe Alexandra
1 February 2021	30 June 2021	Scott Wootton	Plymouth Argyle	Wigan Athletic
1 February 2021	30 June 2021	Callum Wright	Leicester City	Cheltenham Town
1 February 2021	30 June 2021	(Turkey) Okay Yokuşlu	(Spain) Celta Vigo	West Bromwich Albion
2 February 2021	30 June 2021	Mace Goodridge	Burnley	Barrow
5 February 2021	30 June 2021	(Switzerland) Josip Drmić	Norwich City	(Croatia) Rijeka
6 February 2021	30 June 2021	(Austria) Patrick Schmidt	Barnsley	(Austria) SV Ried
12 February 2021	19 February 2021	Joe Wollacott	Bristol City	Swindon Town
15 February 2021	30 June 2021	(Wales) Dylan Levitt	Manchester United	(Croatia) Istra 1961
