= List of English football transfers summer 2020 =

The 2020 English football summer transfer window ran from 27 July to 5 October 2020 due to the effects of the COVID-19 pandemic on the football calendar. Players without a club could be signed at any time, clubs could sign players on loan dependent on their league's regulations, and clubs could sign a goalkeeper on an emergency loan if they had no registered senior goalkeeper available. This list includes transfers featuring at least one club from either the Premier League or the EFL that were completed after the end of the winter 2019–20 transfer window on 31 January and before the end of the 2020 summer window.

== Transfers ==
All players and clubs without a flag are English. Note that while Cardiff City, Swansea City and Newport County are affiliated with the Football Association of Wales and thus take the Welsh flag, they play in the Championship and League Two respectively, and so their transfers are included here.

Date	Name	Moving from	Moving to	Fee
3 February 2020	Anthony Scully	West Ham United	Lincoln City	Undisclosed
4 February 2020	Kwame Thomas	Unattached	Burton Albion	Free
6 February 2020	(Netherlands) Mike te Wierik	(Netherlands) Groningen	Derby County	Free (Note: Player will join the club at the end of the season.)
6 February 2020	(Republic of Ireland) Darron Gibson	Unattached	Salford City	Free
8 February 2020	Donovan Wilson	(Spain) Burgos	Macclesfield Town	Free
11 February 2020	Ben Tollitt	Unattached	Macclesfield Town	Free
17 February 2020	(Guadeloupe) Dimitri Cavaré	Barnsley	(Switzerland) FC Sion	Undisclosed
18 February 2020	(Wales) Robbie Burton	Arsenal	(Croatia) Dinamo Zagreb	Undisclosed
21 February 2020	Miles Welch-Hayes	Unattached	Colchester United	Free
21 February 2020	(New Zealand) Tommy Smith	Unattached	Sunderland	Free
24 February 2020	(Morocco) Hakim Ziyech	(Netherlands) Ajax	Chelsea	£40m
2 March 2020	Alan Sheehan	Unattached	Lincoln City	Free
4 March 2020	(Kenya) Victor Wanyama	Tottenham Hotspur	(Canada) Montreal Impact	Free
11 March 2020	(France) Williams Kokolo	Sunderland	Middlesbrough	Free
12 March 2020	(South Africa) Dino Visser	Unattached	Crewe Alexandra	Free
1 June 2020	Jermain Defoe	Bournemouth	(Scotland) Rangers	Free
9 June 2020	Calvin Bassey	Leicester City	(Scotland) Rangers	Free
15 June 2020	Nathan McGinley	Forest Green Rovers	(Scotland) Motherwell	Free
18 June 2020	Samuel Matthews	Bristol Rovers	Crawley Town	Free
22 June 2020	Jordan Bowery	MK Dons	Mansfield Town	Free
23 June 2020	Sam Ashford	Hemel Hempstead	Crawley Town	Free
23 June 2020	(Scotland) Jon McLaughlin	Sunderland	(Scotland) Rangers	Free
23 June 2020	(France) Morgan Schneiderlin	Everton	(France) Nice	Undisclosed
24 June 2020	(Scotland) Mark O'Hara	Peterborough United	(Scotland) Motherwell	Nominal
26 June 2020	Alex Iacovitti	Oldham Athletic	(Scotland) Ross County	Free
29 June 2020	Keshi Anderson	Swindon Town	Blackpool	Free
29 June 2020	(Czech Republic) Marek Štěch	Luton Town	Mansfield Town	Free
30 June 2020	Regan Charles-Cook	Gillingham	(Scotland) Ross County	Free
30 June 2020	(Slovenia) Jon Gorenc Stanković	Huddersfield Town	(Austria) Sturm Graz	Free
1 July 2020	Christian Burgess	Portsmouth	(Belgium) Union SG	Free
1 July 2020	Ollie Clarke	Bristol Rovers	Mansfield Town	Free
1 July 2020	(France) Pape Gueye	(France) Le Havre	Watford	Undisclosed
1 July 2020	(Scotland) Fraser Hornby	Everton	(France) Reims	Undisclosed
1 July 2020	(Spain) Pablo Marí	(Brazil) Flamengo	Arsenal	£7.2m (Note: Player was previously on loan at the club.)
1 July 2020	(Spain) Álvaro Morata	Chelsea	(Spain) Atlético Madrid	£50.4m
1 July 2020	(Brazil) Nathan	Chelsea	(Brazil) Atlético Mineiro	£2.7m
1 July 2020	(Luxembourg) Danel Sinani	(Luxembourg) F91 Dudelange	Norwich City	Undisclosed
1 July 2020	(Portugal) Cédric Soares	Southampton	Arsenal	Undisclosed
1 July 2020	(Netherlands) Maarten Stekelenburg	Everton	(Netherlands) Ajax	Free
1 July 2020	Dan Sweeney	Barnet	Forest Green Rovers	Free
1 July 2020	(Germany) Timo Werner	(Germany) RB Leipzig	Chelsea	Undisclosed
1 July 2020	(Republic of the Congo) Offrande Zanzala	Accrington Stanley	Crewe Alexandra	Free
2 July 2020	(Ghana) Festus Arthur	Stockport County	Hull City	Undisclosed
2 July 2020	(France) Pape Gueye	Watford	(France) Marseille	Undisclosed
2 July 2020	Mallik Wilks	Barnsley	Hull City	Undisclosed
3 July 2020	(Scotland) Nicky Cadden	(Scotland) Greenock Morton	Forest Green Rovers	Free
3 July 2020	Mark Gillespie	(Scotland) Motherwell	Newcastle United	Free
3 July 2020	(Netherlands) Gustavo Hamer	(Netherlands) PEC Zwolle	Coventry City	£1.5m
3 July 2020	(Germany) Leroy Sané	Manchester City	(Germany) Bayern Munich	£44.7m
5 July 2020	Mickel Miller	(Scotland) Hamilton Academical	Rotherham United	Free
6 July 2020	George Cox	Brighton & Hove Albion	(Netherlands) Fortuna Sittard	Undisclosed
6 July 2020	(France) Julien Dacosta	(France) Chamois Niortais	Coventry City	Free
7 July 2020	(Portugal) Hélder Costa	Wolverhampton Wanderers	Leeds United	£16m
7 July 2020	Jack Evans	Blackburn Rovers	Forest Green Rovers	Free
7 July 2020	Devante Rodney	Salford City	Port Vale	Free
8 July 2020	Marvin Ekpiteta	Leyton Orient	Blackpool	Free
8 July 2020	(France) Anthony Knockaert	Brighton & Hove Albion	Fulham	Undisclosed
8 July 2020	Kane Wilson	West Bromwich Albion	Forest Green Rovers	Free
8 July 2020	Mitchell Pinnock	AFC Wimbledon	(Scotland) Kilmarnock	Free
9 July 2020	(Montenegro) Oliver Sarkic	Burton Albion	Blackpool	Free
10 July 2020	(Republic of Ireland) Eoin Doyle	Swindon Town	Bolton Wanderers	Free
10 July 2020	Ross Marshall	Maidstone United	Stevenage	Free
11 July 2020	Levi Sutton	Scunthorpe United	Bradford City	Free
13 July 2020	(Scotland) Steven Lawless	(Scotland) Livingston	Burton Albion	Free
14 July 2020	Tom Clarke	Preston North End	Salford City	Free
14 July 2020	(Netherlands) Lewis Montsma	(Netherlands) FC Dordrecht	Lincoln City	Free
15 July 2020	Zac Emmerson	Oldham Athletic	Brighton & Hove Albion	Undisclosed
15 July 2020	Luke McGee	Portsmouth	Forest Green Rovers	Free
15 July 2020	Callum O'Hare	Aston Villa	Coventry City	Free
15 July 2020	Antoni Sarcevic	Plymouth Argyle	Bolton Wanderers	Free
16 July 2020	(Mali) Ousseynou Cissé	Gillingham	Leyton Orient	Free
16 July 2020	(Hong Kong) Tsun Dai	Wolverhampton Wanderers	(China) Shenzhen	Undisclosed
16 July 2020	(Germany) Marcel Hilßner	(Germany) SC Paderborn	Coventry City	Free
16 July 2020	Zak Mills	Oldham Athletic	Port Vale	Free
16 July 2020	Jake Young	Sheffield United	Forest Green Rovers	Free
17 July 2020	Billy Clarke	Grimsby Town	Bradford City	Free
17 July 2020	Wes Foderingham	(Scotland) Rangers	Sheffield United	Free
17 July 2020	Ashley Hunter	Fleetwood Town	Salford City	Undisclosed
17 July 2020	Farrend Rawson	Forest Green Rovers	Mansfield Town	Free
18 July 2020	Josh Grant	Chelsea	Bristol Rovers	Free
19 July 2020	(The Gambia) Modou Barrow	Reading	(South Korea) Jeonbuk Hyundai Motors	Undisclosed
20 July 2020	Jack Baldwin	Sunderland	Bristol Rovers	Free
20 July 2020	Tom Beadling	(Scotland) Dunfermline Athletic	Barrow	Free
20 July 2020	Jude Bellingham	Birmingham City	(Germany) Borussia Dortmund	Undisclosed
20 July 2020	Luke James	Hartlepool United	Barrow	Free
20 July 2020	Mike Jones	Carlisle United	Barrow	Free
20 July 2020	(Jamaica) Jamille Matt	(Wales) Newport County	Forest Green Rovers	Free
20 July 2020	Paul Mullin	Tranmere Rovers	Cambridge United	Free
20 July 2020	George Taft	Cambridge United	Bolton Wanderers	Free
20 July 2020	(Denmark) Jacob Sørensen	(Denmark) Esbjerg	Norwich City	Undisclosed
20 July 2020	(Republic of Ireland) Joe Shaughnessy	Southend United	(Scotland) St Mirren	Free
20 July 2020	(Poland) Max Stryjek	Eastleigh	(Scotland) Livingston	Free
21 July 2020	Zaid Al-Hussaini	Unattached	Crawley Town	Free
21 July 2020	(Montserrat) Brandon Comley	Colchester United	Bolton Wanderers	Free
21 July 2020	Paul Digby	Stevenage	Cambridge United	Free
21 July 2020	(Germany) Max Ehmer	Gillingham	Bristol Rovers	Free
21 July 2020	Nathan Ferguson	West Bromwich Albion	Crystal Palace	Free
21 July 2020	Jordan Moore-Taylor	MK Dons	Forest Green Rovers	Free
21 July 2020	Jerry Yates	Rotherham United	Blackpool	Free
22 July 2020	CJ Hamilton	Mansfield Town	Blackpool	Undisclosed
22 July 2020	Brandon Haunstrup	Portsmouth	(Scotland) Kilmarnock	Free
22 July 2020	Billy Johnson	Norwich City	Stevenage	Free
22 July 2020	Jason Lowe	Bolton Wanderers	Salford City	Free
22 July 2020	(Scotland) Sam Nicholson	(United States) Colorado Rapids	Bristol Rovers	Free
23 July 2020	Cheye Alexander	Barnet	AFC Wimbledon	Free
23 July 2020	(France) Illan Meslier	(France) Lorient	Leeds United	Undisclosed
23 July 2020	Jensen Weir	Wigan Athletic	Brighton & Hove Albion	Undisclosed
24 July 2020	(Nigeria) Leon Balogun	Wigan Athletic	(Scotland) Rangers	Free
24 July 2020	(France) Dimitri Foulquier	Watford	(Spain) Granada	Undisclosed
24 July 2020	Ethan Ross	Colchester United	Lincoln City	Free
24 July 2020	(Czech Republic) Tomáš Souček	(Czech Republic) Slavia Prague	West Ham United	£15m
24 July 2020	(France) Romain Vincelot	Shrewsbury Town	Stevenage	Free
25 July 2020	Callum Cooke	Peterborough United	Bradford City	Free
27 July 2020	(Scotland) Daniel Harvie	(Scotland) Ayr United	MK Dons	Undisclosed
27 July 2020	Diallang Jaiyesimi	Norwich City	Swindon Town	Free
27 July 2020	Adam Lallana	Liverpool	Brighton & Hove Albion	Free
27 July 2020	(Croatia) Dejan Lovren	Liverpool	(Russia) Zenit Saint Petersburg	£10.9m
27 July 2020	(Scotland) Conor McGrandles	MK Dons	Lincoln City	Free
27 July 2020	(France) Christopher Missilou	Oldham Athletic	Northampton Town	Free
27 July 2020	Bali Mumba	Sunderland	Norwich City	Undisclosed
27 July 2020	(Montenegro) Matija Sarkic	Aston Villa	Wolverhampton Wanderers	Free
27 July 2020	(Wales) George Thomas	Leicester City	Queens Park Rangers	Free
27 July 2020	(Scotland) Elliot Watt	Wolverhampton Wanderers	Bradford City	Undisclosed
28 July 2020	(Nigeria) Fisayo Dele-Bashiru	Manchester City	Sheffield Wednesday	Undisclosed
28 July 2020	(Republic of Ireland) Wes Hoolahan	(Australia) Newcastle Jets	Cambridge United	Free
28 July 2020	Josh Laurent	Shrewsbury Town	Reading	Free
28 July 2020	Luke McCormick	Swindon Town	Plymouth Argyle	Free
28 July 2020	George Maris	Cambridge United	Mansfield Town	Undisclosed
28 July 2020	(Wales) Rollin Menayese	Bristol Rovers	Mansfield Town	Undisclosed
28 July 2020	(United States) Sebastian Soto	(Germany) Hannover 96	Norwich City	Free
28 July 2020	Jordan Turnbull	Northampton Town	Salford City	Free
29 July 2020	(Kenya) Jonah Ayunga	Havant & Waterlooville	Bristol Rovers	Undisclosed
29 July 2020	Ian Henderson	Rochdale	Salford City	Free
29 July 2020	Matthew Platt	Blackburn Rovers	Barrow	Undisclosed
29 July 2020	(Netherlands) Joël Veltman	(Netherlands) Ajax	Brighton & Hove Albion	Undisclosed
29 July 2020	Andy Williams	Northampton Town	Cheltenham Town	Undisclosed
30 July 2020	Kieran Dowell	Everton	Norwich City	Undisclosed
30 July 2020	(Hungary) Dániel Gyollai	Wigan Athletic	Peterborough United	Free
30 July 2020	(Republic of Ireland) Aiden O'Brien	Millwall	Sunderland	Free
31 July 2020	Grant Hall	Queens Park Rangers	Middlesbrough	Free
31 July 2020	Ryan Jackson	Colchester United	Gillingham	Free
31 July 2020	(Wales) James Jones	Altrincham	Barrow	Free
31 July 2020	(Netherlands) Erwin Mulder	(Wales) Swansea City	(Netherlands) Heerenveen	Free
31 July 2020	Matty Taylor	Bristol City	Oxford United	Free
1 August 2020	(Northern Ireland) Callum Camps	Rochdale	Fleetwood Town	Free
1 August 2020	Tony Craig	Unattached	Crawley Town	Free
1 August 2020	Archie Davies	Brighton & Hove Albion	Crawley Town	Free
1 August 2020	Lewis Freestone	Brighton & Hove Albion	Cheltenham Town	Free
1 August 2020	Tyler Frost	Reading	Crawley Town	Free
1 August 2020	(Guyana) Liam Gordon	Dagenham & Redbridge	Bolton Wanderers	Undisclosed
1 August 2020	(Scotland) Stephen Hendrie	(Scotland) Kilmarnock	Morecambe	Free
1 August 2020	Joe Ironside	Macclesfield Town	Cambridge United	Free
1 August 2020	(France) Mikael Mandron	Gillingham	Crewe Alexandra	Free
2 August 2020	Cameron Borthwick-Jackson	Manchester United	Oldham Athletic	Free
2 August 2020	Harry Davis	Grimsby Town	Morecambe	Free
2 August 2020	Callum Gribbin	Sheffield United	Barrow	Free
2 August 2020	(Portugal) Sido Jombati	Wycombe Wanderers	Oldham Athletic	Free
2 August 2020	(Democratic Republic of the Congo) Jason Lokilo	Crystal Palace	Doncaster Rovers	Free
2 August 2020	Carl Piergianni	Salford City	Oldham Athletic	Undisclosed
2 August 2020	(Australia) Bailey Wright	Bristol City	Sunderland	Free
3 August 2020	(Australia) Cameron Burgess	Scunthorpe United	Accrington Stanley	Free
3 August 2020	(Northern Ireland) Josh Daniels	(Northern Ireland) Glenavon	Shrewsbury Town	Free
3 August 2020	Ryan Edwards	Blackpool	(Scotland) Dundee United	Free
3 August 2020	Aaron Jarvis	Sutton United	Scunthorpe United	Free
3 August 2020	Nathaniel Knight-Percival	Carlisle United	Morecambe	Free
3 August 2020	Rod McDonald	AFC Wimbledon	Carlisle United	Free
3 August 2020	Kelsey Mooney	Aston Villa	Scunthorpe United	Free
3 August 2020	Alex Newby	Chorley	Rochdale	Free
3 August 2020	Frank Nouble	Colchester United	Plymouth Argyle	Free
3 August 2020	Emmanuel Onariase	Dagenham & Redbridge	Scunthorpe United	Undisclosed
3 August 2020	Rekeil Pyke	Huddersfield Town	Shrewsbury Town	Free
3 August 2020	Sean Raggett	Norwich City	Portsmouth	Free
3 August 2020	Jordan Rossiter	(Scotland) Rangers	Fleetwood Town	Free
3 August 2020	(Portugal) Ricardo Santos	Barnet	Bolton Wanderers	Free
3 August 2020	(Scotland) Lewis Spence	(Scotland) Ross County	Scunthorpe United	Free
3 August 2020	George Tanner	Manchester United	Carlisle United	Free
3 August 2020	Zain Westbrooke	Coventry City	Bristol Rovers	Undisclosed
3 August 2020	Danny Whitehead	Salford City	Port Vale	Free
4 August 2020	(Northern Ireland) Bobby Burns	(Scotland) Heart of Midlothian	Barrow	Free
4 August 2020	(Wales) Neal Eardley	Lincoln City	Burton Albion	Free
4 August 2020	(Guyana) Reiss Greenidge	(Norway) Arendal	Bolton Wanderers	Free
4 August 2020	(Wales) Gethin Jones	Carlisle United	Bolton Wanderers	Free
4 August 2020	(Republic of Ireland) Liam McAlinden	FC Halifax Town	Morecambe	Free
4 August 2020	(Scotland) Gavin Reilly	Bristol Rovers	Carlisle United	Free
4 August 2020	Liam Sercombe	Bristol Rovers	Cheltenham Town	Free
4 August 2020	(Spain) Ferran Torres	(Spain) Valencia	Manchester City	£20.87m
5 August 2020	(Netherlands) Nathan Aké	Bournemouth	Manchester City	£41m
5 August 2020	Michael Bostwick	Lincoln City	Burton Albion	Free
5 August 2020	Jordan Clark	Accrington Stanley	Luton Town	Free
5 August 2020	(Scotland) Alex Jakubiak	Watford	(Scotland) Dundee	Free
5 August 2020	Vadaine Oliver	Northampton Town	Gillingham	Free
5 August 2020	Joe Riley	Bradford City	Carlisle United	Free
5 August 2020	Jay Spearing	Blackpool	Tranmere Rovers	Free
5 August 2020	Dru Yearwood	Brentford	(United States) New York Red Bulls	Undisclosed
6 August 2020	Jack Armer	Preston North End	Carlisle United	Free
6 August 2020	Jake Caprice	Tranmere Rovers	Exeter City	Free
6 August 2020	Sean Clare	(Scotland) Heart of Midlothian	Oxford United	Undisclosed
6 August 2020	(United States) Luca de la Torre	Fulham	(Netherlands) Heracles Almelo	Free
6 August 2020	Nathan Delfouneso	Blackpool	Bolton Wanderers	Free
6 August 2020	Danny Devine	Bradford City	Carlisle United	Free
6 August 2020	(Scotland) Matt Gilks	Fleetwood Town	Bolton Wanderers	Free
6 August 2020	Jak Hickman	Coventry City	Bolton Wanderers	Free
6 August 2020	(Northern Ireland) Rory McArdle	Scunthorpe United	Exeter City	Free
6 August 2020	Ethan Robson	Sunderland	Blackpool	Free
6 August 2020	(Chile) Alexis Sánchez	Manchester United	(Italy) Inter Milan	Free
6 August 2020	Alex Woodyard	Peterborough United	AFC Wimbledon	Free
7 August 2020	Alex Baptiste	Doncaster Rovers	Bolton Wanderers	Free
7 August 2020	(Scotland) Liam Bridcutt	Nottingham Forest	Lincoln City	Free
7 August 2020	(Guinea-Bissau) Panutche Camará	Crawley Town	Plymouth Argyle	Free
7 August 2020	Lewie Coyle	Fleetwood Town	Hull City	Undisclosed
7 August 2020	Josh Emmanuel	Bolton Wanderers	Hull City	Free
7 August 2020	(Wales) Morgan Fox	Sheffield Wednesday	Stoke City	Free
7 August 2020	(Portugal) Boubacar Hanne	Wolverhampton Wanderers	(Portugal) Gil Vicente	Undisclosed
7 August 2020	(Republic of Ireland) Richard Keogh	Unattached	MK Dons	Free
7 August 2020	Magnus Norman	Fulham	Carlisle United	Free
7 August 2020	Ollie Palmer	Crawley Town	AFC Wimbledon	Free
8 August 2020	Joseph Mills	Forest Green Rovers	Northampton Town	Free
10 August 2020	(Wales) James Chester	Aston Villa	Stoke City	Free
10 August 2020	Joe Gelhardt	Wigan Athletic	Leeds United	Undisclosed
10 August 2020	Otis Khan	Mansfield Town	Tranmere Rovers	Free
10 August 2020	Jacob Mellis	Bolton Wanderers	Gillingham	Free
10 August 2020	Ben Pringle	Gillingham	Morecambe	Free
10 August 2020	(Greece) Kostas Tsimikas	(Greece) Olympiacos	Liverpool	£11.75m
10 August 2020	Elliot Whitehouse	Grimsby Town	Forest Green Rovers	Free
11 August 2020	(Northern Ireland) Charlie Allen	(Northern Ireland) Linfield	Leeds United	Undisclosed
11 August 2020	Jack Colback	Newcastle United	Nottingham Forest	Free
11 August 2020	(Denmark) Pierre-Emile Højbjerg	Southampton	Tottenham Hotspur	£15m
11 August 2020	(Northern Ireland) Rory Holden	Bristol City	Walsall	Undisclosed
11 August 2020	Adam Jackson	(Scotland) Hibernian	Lincoln City	Undisclosed
11 August 2020	Davis Keillor-Dunn	(Wales) Wrexham	Oldham Athletic	Free
11 August 2020	Connor Kirby	Sheffield Wednesday	Harrogate Town	Free
11 August 2020	(Tunisia) Bilel Mohsni	Unattached	Grimsby Town	Free
11 August 2020	(Republic of Ireland) Kieran Sadlier	Doncaster Rovers	Rotherham United	Free
11 August 2020	Richard Smallwood	Blackburn Rovers	Hull City	Free
11 August 2020	James Vaughan	Bradford City	Tranmere Rovers	Free
11 August 2020	Kyle Walker-Peters	Tottenham Hotspur	Southampton	£12m
12 August 2020	Ethan Chislett	Aldershot Town	AFC Wimbledon	Free
12 August 2020	Jordan Graham	Wolverhampton Wanderers	Gillingham	Free
12 August 2020	Kane Hemmings	(Scotland) Dundee	Burton Albion	Free
12 August 2020	Jacob Maddox	Chelsea	(Portugal) Vitória de Guimarães	Undisclosed
12 August 2020	(Ghana) Mohammed Salisu	(Spain) Valladolid	Southampton	£10.9m
12 August 2020	Luke Varney	Cheltenham Town	Burton Albion	Free
13 August 2020	(Switzerland) Albian Ajeti	West Ham United	(Scotland) Celtic	£4.5m
13 August 2020	Brennan Dickenson	Exeter City	Carlisle United	Free
13 August 2020	Cody Drameh	Fulham	Leeds United	Undisclosed
13 August 2020	Chey Dunkley	Wigan Athletic	Sheffield Wednesday	Undisclosed
13 August 2020	Montel Gibson	Halesowen Town	Grimsby Town	Free
13 August 2020	Alex Gilbey	MK Dons	Charlton Athletic	Undisclosed
13 August 2020	(Scotland) Ethan Hamilton	Manchester United	Peterborough United	Free
13 August 2020	Kelvin Mellor	Bradford City	Morecambe	Free
13 August 2020	(Wales) Kieffer Moore	Wigan Athletic	(Wales) Cardiff City	£2m
13 August 2020	(Republic of Ireland) Corey O'Keeffe	Birmingham City	Mansfield Town	Free
13 August 2020	James Perch	Scunthorpe United	Mansfield Town	Free
13 August 2020	(Wales) Joe Walsh	MK Dons	Lincoln City	Free
13 August 2020	(Northern Ireland) Conor Washington	(Scotland) Heart of Midlothian	Charlton Athletic	Undisclosed
14 August 2020	(Scotland) Steven Fletcher	Sheffield Wednesday	Stoke City	Free
14 August 2020	Fraser Horsfall	Macclesfield Town	Northampton Town	Free
14 August 2020	(Australia) Jack Iredale	Carlisle United	Cambridge United	Free
14 August 2020	Kevin Lokko	Dover Athletic	Harrogate Town	Free
14 August 2020	(Scotland) Alex MacDonald	Mansfield Town	Gillingham	Free
14 August 2020	Jeremy Ngakia	West Ham United	Watford	Free
14 August 2020	Will Norris	Wolverhampton Wanderers	Burnley	Free
14 August 2020	(Spain) Alhagi Touray Sisay	(Wales) Aberystwyth Town	Grimsby Town	Free
14 August 2020	(Brazil) Willian	Chelsea	Arsenal	Free
15 August 2020	Tyler Blackett	Reading	Nottingham Forest	Free
15 August 2020	George Friend	Middlesbrough	Birmingham City	Free
15 August 2020	Angus MacDonald	Hull City	Rotherham United	Free
15 August 2020	(Montserrat) Lyle Taylor	Charlton Athletic	Nottingham Forest	Free
17 August 2020	Luke Amos	Tottenham Hotspur	Queens Park Rangers	Undisclosed
17 August 2020	(Wales) David Cornell	Unattached	Ipswich Town	Free
17 August 2020	Kyle Dempsey	Fleetwood Town	Gillingham	Free
17 August 2020	Paul Farman	Stevenage	Carlisle United	Free
17 August 2020	Oli Hawkins	Unattached	Ipswich Town	Free
17 August 2020	Uche Ikpeazu	(Scotland) Heart of Midlothian	Wycombe Wanderers	Undisclosed
17 August 2020	Paul Lewis	Unattached	Tranmere Rovers	Free
17 August 2020	(Nigeria) John Obi Mikel	Unattached	Stoke City	Free
17 August 2020	(Brazil) Matheus Pereira	(Portugal) Sporting CP	West Bromwich Albion	Undisclosed
17 August 2020	(Spain) David Silva	Manchester City	(Spain) Real Sociedad	Free
17 August 2020	Danny Ward	Cardiff City	Huddersfield Town	Free
17 August 2020	(Republic of Ireland) Stephen Ward	Unattached	Ipswich Town	Free
18 August 2020	Dylan Asonganyi	MK Dons	Oxford United	Free
18 August 2020	Joe Hart	Burnley	Tottenham Hotspur	Free
18 August 2020	(Greece) José Holebas	Watford	(Greece) Olympiacos	Free
18 August 2020	Conor McAleny	Fleetwood Town	Oldham Athletic	Free
18 August 2020	Akin Odimayo	Reading	Swindon Town	Free
18 August 2020	(France) Gime Touré	Hartlepool United	Carlisle United	Free
19 August 2020	Ben Chrisene	Exeter City	Aston Villa	Undisclosed
19 August 2020	(Scotland) Lyndon Dykes	(Scotland) Livingston	Queens Park Rangers	Undisclosed
19 August 2020	Charlie Goode	Northampton Town	Brentford	Undisclosed
19 August 2020	(Republic of Ireland) Aaron O'Driscoll	Southampton	Mansfield Town	Free
19 August 2020	Aaron Ramsdale	Bournemouth	Sheffield United	£18.5m
20 August 2020	(Scotland) Greg Docherty	(Scotland) Rangers	Hull City	Undisclosed
20 August 2020	(Austria) Dominik Frieser	(Austria) LASK	Barnsley	Undisclosed
20 August 2020	Wes Harding	Birmingham City	Rotherham United	Undisclosed
20 August 2020	(United States) Giles Phillips	Queens Park Rangers	Wycombe Wanderers	Free
20 August 2020	(United States) Antonee Robinson	Wigan Athletic	Fulham	£2m
20 August 2020	Joe Williams	Wigan Athletic	Bristol City	Undisclosed
21 August 2020	(Brazil) Matheus Aiás	Watford	(United States) Orlando City	Undisclosed
21 August 2020	(Republic of Ireland) Cian Bolger	Lincoln City	Northampton Town	Free
21 August 2020	Marcus Dinanga	Telford United	Stevenage	Free
21 August 2020	Morgan Feeney	Everton	Sunderland	Free
21 August 2020	(Scotland) David Marshall	Wigan Athletic	Derby County	Undisclosed
21 August 2020	Remi Matthews	Bolton Wanderers	Sunderland	Free
21 August 2020	Robbie McKenzie	Hull City	Gillingham	Free
21 August 2020	(France) Derick Osei	Unattached	Oxford United	Free
22 August 2020	(Czech Republic) Václav Hladký	(Scotland) St Mirren	Salford City	Free
22 August 2020	(Republic of Ireland) Joe Murphy	Shrewsbury Town	Tranmere Rovers	Free
24 August 2020	(Scotland) Theo Archibald	Macclesfield Town	Lincoln City	Free
24 August 2020	(Wales) Ryan Broom	Cheltenham Town	Peterborough United	Undisclosed
24 August 2020	Matt Butcher	Bournemouth	Accrington Stanley	Undisclosed
24 August 2020	Jordan Hugill	West Ham United	Norwich City	£5m
24 August 2020	Jamie Mascoll	Wycombe Wanderers	Bolton Wanderers	Free
24 August 2020	(Jamaica) Theo Robinson	Southend United	Port Vale	Free
24 August 2020	(Wales) Jordan Williams	Rochdale	Blackpool	Free
25 August 2020	(Slovakia) Alex Fojtíček	Manchester United	Blackpool	Free
25 August 2020	(Republic of Ireland) Dylan Connolly	AFC Wimbledon	(Scotland) St Mirren	Free
25 August 2020	David Fitzpatrick	Macclesfield Town	Port Vale	Free
25 August 2020	Jason McCarthy	Millwall	Wycombe Wanderers	Undisclosed
25 August 2020	(Spain) Martín Montoya	Brighton & Hove Albion	(Spain) Real Betis	Undisclosed
25 August 2020	(Spain) Pedro	Chelsea	(Italy) Roma	Free
25 August 2020	(Spain) Jon Toral	Hull City	Birmingham City	Free
26 August 2020	(Comoros) Fouad Bachirou	(Sweden) Malmö FF	Nottingham Forest	Undisclosed
26 August 2020	Ben Chilwell	Leicester City	Chelsea	£45m
26 August 2020	(Belgium) Thomas Kaminski	(Belgium) Gent	Blackburn Rovers	Undisclosed
26 August 2020	(Democratic Republic of the Congo) Christian Maghoma	(Poland) Arka Gdynia	Gillingham	Free
26 August 2020	Scott Wagstaff	AFC Wimbledon	Forest Green Rovers	Free
27 August 2020	Jonson Clarke-Harris	Bristol Rovers	Peterborough United	Undisclosed
27 August 2020	(Montserrat) Donervon Daniels	Luton Town	Crewe Alexandra	Free
27 August 2020	Rhys Healey	MK Dons	(France) Toulouse	Undisclosed
27 August 2020	Jamal Lowe	Wigan Athletic	(Wales) Swansea City	£800k
27 August 2020	(Spain) Iván Sánchez	(Spain) Elche	Birmingham City	Free
27 August 2020	(France) Malang Sarr	Unattached	Chelsea	Free
27 August 2020	(South Africa) Dino Visser	Crewe Alexandra	Port Vale	Free
27 August 2020	Ed Williams	Kidderminster Harriers	Doncaster Rovers	Free
28 August 2020	Mason Bennett	Derby County	Millwall	Undisclosed
28 August 2020	Ovie Ejaria	Liverpool	Reading	Undisclosed
28 August 2020	Eberechi Eze	Queens Park Rangers	Crystal Palace	£19.5m
28 August 2020	(South Africa) Dean Furman	(South Africa) SuperSport United	Carlisle United	Free
28 August 2020	Shamal George	Liverpool	Colchester United	Free
28 August 2020	Cameron John	Wolverhampton Wanderers	Doncaster Rovers	Undisclosed
28 August 2020	(Spain) Roberto	West Ham United	(Spain) Valladolid	Free
28 August 2020	Jonathan Leko	West Bromwich Albion	Birmingham City	Undisclosed
28 August 2020	(Germany) Toni Leistner	Queens Park Rangers	(Germany) Hamburger SV	Free
28 August 2020	(Australia) Aaron Mooy	Brighton & Hove Albion	(China) Shanghai SIPG	Undisclosed
28 August 2020	(Spain) Andrés Prieto	(Spain) Espanyol	Birmingham City	Free
28 August 2020	(Brazil) Thiago Silva	(France) Paris Saint-Germain	Chelsea	Free
28 August 2020	(Democratic Republic of the Congo) David Tutonda	Barnet	Bristol Rovers	Free
28 August 2020	Tyler Walker	Nottingham Forest	Coventry City	Undisclosed
28 August 2020	Callum Whelan	Watford	Oldham Athletic	Free
29 August 2020	Myles Hippolyte	Yeovil Town	Scunthorpe United	Undisclosed
29 August 2020	(Germany) Robin Koch	(Germany) SC Freiburg	Leeds United	Undisclosed
29 August 2020	(Spain) Rodrigo	(Spain) Valencia	Leeds United	£26m
30 August 2020	(Chile) Claudio Bravo	Manchester City	(Spain) Real Betis	Free
30 August 2020	(Republic of Ireland) Matt Doherty	Wolverhampton Wanderers	Tottenham Hotspur	Undisclosed
30 August 2020	Harrison Reed	Southampton	Fulham	Undisclosed
31 August 2020	Ryan Loft	Leicester City	Scunthorpe United	Free
31 August 2020	(Armenia) Henrikh Mkhitaryan	Arsenal	(Italy) Roma	Free
31 August 2020	Danny Rose	Swindon Town	Grimsby Town	Free
31 August 2020	Ivan Toney	Peterborough United	Brentford	Undisclosed
1 September 2020	Jordan Barnett	Barnsley	Oldham Athletic	Free
1 September 2020	James Bree	Aston Villa	Luton Town	Undisclosed
1 September 2020	Adam Clayton	Middlesbrough	Birmingham City	Free
1 September 2020	(Portugal) Félix Correia	Manchester City	(Italy) Juventus	£9.5m
1 September 2020	Rob Dickie	Oxford United	Queens Park Rangers	Undisclosed
1 September 2020	Jake Hessenthaler	Grimsby Town	Crawley Town	Free
1 September 2020	Kyle Jameson	AFC Fylde	Oldham Athletic	Free
1 September 2020	Ricky Korboa	Carshalton Athletic	Northampton Town	Undisclosed
1 September 2020	(Wales) Tom Lockyer	Charlton Athletic	Luton Town	Undisclosed
1 September 2020	(Democratic Republic of the Congo) Beryly Lubala	Crawley Town	Blackpool	Undisclosed
1 September 2020	(Brazil) Gabriel	(France) Lille	Arsenal	£27m
1 September 2020	(Guyana) Kai McKenzie-Lyle	Liverpool	Cambridge United	Free
1 September 2020	Lewis Page	Charlton Athletic	Exeter City	Free
1 September 2020	(Croatia) Mario Pašalić	Chelsea	(Italy) Atalanta	£13.4m
2 September 2020	Curtis Anderson	Unattached	Wycombe Wanderers	Free
2 September 2020	George Cooper	Peterborough United	Plymouth Argyle	Undisclosed
2 September 2020	(Republic of Ireland) Daryl Horgan	(Scotland) Hibernian	Wycombe Wanderers	Undisclosed
2 September 2020	(Sweden) Viktor Johansson	Leicester City	Rotherham United	Free
2 September 2020	(Democratic Republic of the Congo) Elias Kachunga	Huddersfield Town	Sheffield Wednesday	Free
2 September 2020	(Republic of Ireland) Sean Scannell	Blackpool	Grimsby Town	Free
2 September 2020	Tom Scully	Norwich City	Accrington Stanley	Free
2 September 2020	(Wales) Liam Shephard	Forest Green Rovers	(Wales) Newport County	Free
2 September 2020	Ryan Tafazolli	Hull City	Wycombe Wanderers	Undisclosed
2 September 2020	(Netherlands) Donny van de Beek	(Netherlands) Ajax	Manchester United	£35m
2 September 2020	Josh Windass	Wigan Athletic	Sheffield Wednesday	Undisclosed
3 September 2020	Matty Cash	Nottingham Forest	Aston Villa	£16m
3 September 2020	(Belgium) Timothy Castagne	(Italy) Atalanta	Leicester City	£25m
3 September 2020	(Germany) Kenan Dünnwald-Turan	(Germany) Bonner SC	Scunthorpe United	Free
3 September 2020	Max Harris	Unattached	Cheltenham Town	Free
3 September 2020	(Scotland) Chris Martin	Derby County	Bristol City	Free
3 September 2020	(South Africa) Kgosi Ntlhe	Scunthorpe United	Barrow	Free
3 September 2020	(Republic of Ireland) Emmanuel Osadebe	Unattached	Walsall	Free
3 September 2020	(Northern Ireland) Ben Reeves	MK Dons	Plymouth Argyle	Free
3 September 2020	Jack Rose	Southampton	Walsall	Free
3 September 2020	Andrew Tutte	Morecambe	Bolton Wanderers	Free
3 September 2020	Hayden White	Mansfield Town	Walsall	Free
4 September 2020	(Grenada) Omar Beckles	Shrewsbury Town	Crewe Alexandra	Free
4 September 2020	Tom Carroll	Unattached	Queens Park Rangers	Free
4 September 2020	Grady Diangana	West Ham United	West Bromwich Albion	£18m
4 September 2020	Mark Duffy	Sheffield United	Fleetwood Town	Free
4 September 2020	Kevin Ellison	Morecambe	(Wales) Newport County	Free
4 September 2020	Dan Gardner	Unattached	Wigan Athletic	Free
4 September 2020	(Spain) Miguel Ángel Guerrero	(Greece) Olympiacos	Nottingham Forest	Undisclosed
4 September 2020	(Germany) Kai Havertz	(Germany) Bayer Leverkusen	Chelsea	£71m
4 September 2020	Remy Howarth	(Wales) Cefn Druids	Lincoln City	Undisclosed
4 September 2020	Alfie Jones	Southampton	Hull City	Undisclosed
4 September 2020	(Ivory Coast) Cédric Kipré	Wigan Athletic	West Bromwich Albion	£900k
4 September 2020	Adam May	Portsmouth	Cambridge United	Free
4 September 2020	Demetri Mitchell	Manchester United	Blackpool	Free
4 September 2020	Luke Murphy	Bolton Wanderers	Crewe Alexandra	Free
4 September 2020	(Jersey) Brett Pitman	Portsmouth	Swindon Town	Free
4 September 2020	(Germany) Stephen Sama	Unattached	Accrington Stanley	Free
4 September 2020	Viv Solomon-Otabor	Unattached	Wigan Athletic	Free
4 September 2020	Scott Wilson	Burnley	Barrow	Free
4 September 2020	(Kosovo) Arbenit Xhemajli	(Switzerland) Neuchâtel Xamax	Sunderland	Undisclosed
5 September 2020	(Brazil) Allan	(Italy) Napoli	Everton	£21.7m
5 September 2020	David Button	Brighton & Hove Albion	West Bromwich Albion	Undisclosed
5 September 2020	Shaun Hobson	Bournemouth	Southend United	Undisclosed
5 September 2020	Shaun Miller	Crewe Alexandra	Bolton Wanderers	Free
5 September 2020	(Portugal) Fábio Silva	(Portugal) Porto	Wolverhampton Wanderers	£35m
6 September 2020	(Spain) Borja Bastón	Aston Villa	(Spain) Leganés	Free
6 September 2020	(Australia) George Blackwood	(Australia) Adelaide United	Oldham Athletic	Free
6 September 2020	(Brazil) Marçal	(France) Lyon	Wolverhampton Wanderers	£1.78m
7 September 2020	Benny Ashley-Seal	Wolverhampton Wanderers	Northampton Town	Undisclosed
7 September 2020	Jayden Bogle	Derby County	Sheffield United	Undisclosed
7 September 2020	(Northern Ireland) Chris Brunt	West Bromwich Albion	Bristol City	Free
7 September 2020	Isaac Christie-Davies	Liverpool	Barnsley	Free
7 September 2020	(Scotland) Ryan Fraser	Bournemouth	Newcastle United	Free
7 September 2020	Danny Graham	Blackburn Rovers	Sunderland	Free
7 September 2020	Callum Johnson	Accrington Stanley	Portsmouth	Undisclosed
7 September 2020	Max Lowe	Derby County	Sheffield United	Undisclosed
7 September 2020	Tom Nichols	Bristol Rovers	Crawley Town	Free
7 September 2020	(Croatia) Stipe Perica	(Italy) Udinese	Watford	Undisclosed
7 September 2020	(Spain) Pipa	(Spain) Espanyol	Huddersfield Town	Undisclosed
7 September 2020	(Colombia) James Rodríguez	(Spain) Real Madrid	Everton	£12m
7 September 2020	(Egypt) Ramadan Sobhi	Huddersfield Town	(Egypt) Pyramids	Undisclosed
7 September 2020	Callum Wilson	Bournemouth	Newcastle United	£20m
8 September 2020	Matty Blair	Doncaster Rovers	Cheltenham Town	Free
8 September 2020	(France) Abdoulaye Doucouré	Watford	Everton	£20m
8 September 2020	(Northern Ireland) Jamal Lewis	Norwich City	Newcastle United	Undisclosed
8 September 2020	(Scotland) Jack Ruddy	Unattached	Plymouth Argyle	Free
8 September 2020	Sammy Szmodics	Bristol City	Peterborough United	Undisclosed
9 September 2020	(Italy) Andrea Badan	Unattached	Oldham Athletic	Free
9 September 2020	Jacob Brown	Barnsley	Stoke City	Undisclosed
9 September 2020	(Scotland) Oliver Burke	West Bromwich Albion	Sheffield United	Part-exchange
9 September 2020	(Kosovo) Bersant Celina	(Wales) Swansea City	(France) Dijon	Undisclosed
9 September 2020	(Scotland) Scott Fraser	Burton Albion	MK Dons	Free
9 September 2020	(Poland) Michal Helik	(Poland) Cracovia	Barnsley	Undisclosed
9 September 2020	(Benin) Steve Mounié	Huddersfield Town	(France) Brest	Undisclosed
9 September 2020	(Australia) Aiden O'Neill	Burnley	(Australia) Melbourne City	Free
9 September 2020	(Republic of Ireland) Callum Robinson	Sheffield United	West Bromwich Albion	Part-exchange
9 September 2020	(Chile) Francisco Sierralta	(Italy) Udinese	Watford	Undisclosed
9 September 2020	David Stockdale	Birmingham City	Wycombe Wanderers	Free
9 September 2020	Sam Stubbs	Middlesbrough	Fleetwood Town	Undisclosed
9 September 2020	Ollie Watkins	Brentford	Aston Villa	£28m
10 September 2020	Nathan Byrne	Wigan Athletic	Derby County	Undisclosed
10 September 2020	(Portugal) Leonardo Lopes	Hull City	(Belgium) Cercle Brugge	Undisclosed
10 September 2020	Brandon Hanlan	Bristol Rovers	Gillingham	Undisclosed
10 September 2020	Joe Fryer	Unattached	Swindon Town	Free
10 September 2020	(Netherlands) Kenny Tete	(France) Lyon	Fulham	Undisclosed
11 September 2020	Andy Butler	Scunthorpe United	Doncaster Rovers	Free
11 September 2020	Josh Clarke	Brentford	Wigan Athletic	Free
11 September 2020	(Philippines) Neil Etheridge	(Wales) Cardiff City	Birmingham City	Undisclosed
11 September 2020	(Scotland) Owen Gallacher	Nottingham Forest	Burton Albion	Free
11 September 2020	(Kosovo) Florent Hoti	Rochdale	(Scotland) Dundee United	Undisclosed
11 September 2020	Stephen Humphrys	Southend United	Rochdale	Undisclosed
11 September 2020	(Canada) Jayson Leutwiler	Blackburn Rovers	Fleetwood Town	Free
11 September 2020	Harry McKirdy	Carlisle United	Port Vale	Free
11 September 2020	(Republic of Ireland) Stephen McLaughlin	Southend United	Mansfield Town	Free
11 September 2020	Melvin Minter	Salford City	Harrogate Town	Free
11 September 2020	(Egypt) Sam Morsy	Wigan Athletic	Middlesbrough	Undisclosed
11 September 2020	(Republic of Ireland) Kieran O'Hara	Manchester United	Burton Albion	Free
11 September 2020	(France) Naby Sarr	Charlton Athletic	Huddersfield Town	Free
11 September 2020	(France) Loïc Mbe Soh	(France) Paris Saint-Germain	Nottingham Forest	Undisclosed
11 September 2020	Sam Winnall	Sheffield Wednesday	Oxford United	Free
12 September 2020	Josh Lillis	Rochdale	Barrow	Free
12 September 2020	(Hungary) Dániel Csóka	Wolverhampton Wanderers	AFC Wimbledon	Free
14 September 2020	(Senegal) Abdoulaye Diallo	(Turkey) Gençlerbirliği	Nottingham Forest	Undisclosed
14 September 2020	Michael Jacobs	Wigan Athletic	Portsmouth	Free
14 September 2020	(Austria) Thomas Mayer	Austria Lustenau	Hull City	Free
14 September 2020	Kaiyne Woolery	Swindon Town	Tranmere Rovers	Free
15 September 2020	(Scotland) Charlie Adam	Reading	(Scotland) Dundee	Free
15 September 2020	(Spain) Daniel Ayala	Middlesbrough	Blackburn Rovers	Free
15 September 2020	(Serbia) Branislav Ivanović	Unattached	West Bromwich Albion	Free
16 September 2020	(Ecuador) Pervis Estupiñán	Watford	(Spain) Villarreal	£15m
16 September 2020	Scott Hogan	Aston Villa	Birmingham City	Undisclosed
16 September 2020	(Poland) Kamil Jóźwiak	(Poland) Lech Poznań	Derby County	Undisclosed
16 September 2020	(Argentina) Emiliano Martínez	Arsenal	Aston Villa	£17m
17 September 2020	(Nigeria) Simeon Akinola	Barnet	Southend United	Free
17 September 2020	Jonathan Grounds	Birmingham City	Swindon Town	Free
17 September 2020	(Republic of Ireland) Alan McCormack	Northampton Town	Southend United	Free
18 September 2020	(Spain) Thiago	(Germany) Bayern Munich	Liverpool	£20m
18 September 2020	Nathan Cameron	Macclesfield Town	Wigan Athletic	Free
18 September 2020	Sam Finley	Accrington Stanley	Fleetwood Town	Free
18 September 2020	(Jamaica) Joel Grant	Plymouth Argyle	Swindon Town	Free
18 September 2020	Jack Sowerby	Fleetwood Town	Northampton Town	Undisclosed
19 September 2020	Chuba Akpom	(Greece) PAOK	Middlesbrough	Undisclosed
19 September 2020	(Netherlands) Ki-Jana Hoever	Liverpool	Wolverhampton Wanderers	£9m
19 September 2020	(Portugal) Diogo Jota	Wolverhampton Wanderers	Liverpool	£41m
19 September 2020	(Spain) Sergio Reguilón	(Spain) Real Madrid	Tottenham Hotspur	£29m
19 September 2020	(Burkina Faso) Bertrand Traoré	(France) Lyon	Aston Villa	£17m
21 September 2020	(Iceland) Rúnar Alex Rúnarsson	(France) Dijon	Arsenal	Undisclosed
21 September 2020	Dominic Samuel	Blackburn Rovers	Gillingham	Free
21 September 2020	(Spain) Mikel San José	(Spain) Athletic Bilbao	Birmingham City	Free
22 September 2020	(Republic of Ireland) Harry Arter	Bournemouth	Nottingham Forest	Undisclosed
22 September 2020	Luke Garbutt	Everton	Blackpool	Free
22 September 2020	Liam Gibson	Newcastle United	Morecambe	Free
22 September 2020	Jordon Ibe	Bournemouth	Derby County	Free
22 September 2020	(Norway) Alexander Sørloth	Crystal Palace	(Germany) RB Leipzig	Undisclosed
23 September 2020	(Scotland) Scott McKenna	(Scotland) Aberdeen	Nottingham Forest	Undisclosed
23 September 2020	(Portugal) Nélson Semedo	(Spain) Barcelona	Wolverhampton Wanderers	£27.6m
23 September 2020	(Cameroon) Yann Songo'o	Scunthorpe United	Morecambe	Free
24 September 2020	Jake Beesley	Solihull Moors	Rochdale	Undisclosed
24 September 2020	Rhys Fenlon	Burnley	Accrington Stanley	Free
24 September 2020	(Spain) Diego Llorente	(Spain) Real Sociedad	Leeds United	Undisclosed
24 September 2020	(Senegal) Édouard Mendy	(France) Rennes	Chelsea	£22m
24 September 2020	Dale Stephens	Brighton & Hove Albion	Burnley	Undisclosed
25 September 2020	Leon Clarke	Sheffield United	Shrewsbury Town	Free
25 September 2020	Bobby Duncan	(Italy) Fiorentina	Derby County	Undisclosed
25 September 2020	Gareth Evans	Portsmouth	Bradford City	Free
25 September 2020	(Kosovo) Florent Hadergjonaj	Huddersfield Town	(Turkey) Kasımpaşa	Undisclosed
25 September 2020	(Cyprus) Nicholas Ioannou	(Cyprus) APOEL	Nottingham Forest	Undisclosed
25 September 2020	Ben Watson	Nottingham Forest	Charlton Athletic	Free
26 September 2020	Arthur Gnahoua	Macclesfield Town	Bolton Wanderers	Free
26 September 2020	(Wales) Lloyd Isgrove	Swindon Town	Bolton Wanderers	Free
28 September 2020	(Argentina) Roberto Pereyra	Watford	(Italy) Udinese	Undisclosed
29 September 2020	(Portugal) Rúben Dias	(Portugal) Benfica	Manchester City	£65m
29 September 2020	(Argentina) Nicolás Otamendi	Manchester City	(Portugal) Benfica	£13.7m
29 September 2020	(Nigeria) William Troost-Ekong	(Italy) Udinese	Watford	Undisclosed
30 September 2020	(Scotland) Callum Paterson	(Wales) Cardiff City	Sheffield Wednesday	Undisclosed
1 October 2020	(Denmark) Emil Riis Jakobsen	(Denmark) Randers	Preston North End	Undisclosed
1 October 2020	Marcus Maddison	Peterborough United	Charlton Athletic	Free
1 October 2020	(France) Yoan Zouma	Bolton Wanderers	Barrow	Free
2 October 2020	(Republic of the Congo) Dylan Bahamboula	(Bulgaria) Tsarsko Selo	Oldham Athletic	Free
2 October 2020	Dan Barlaser	Newcastle United	Rotherham United	Free
2 October 2020	Rhian Brewster	Liverpool	Sheffield United	£23.5m
2 October 2020	(Zimbabwe) Macauley Bonne	Charlton Athletic	Queens Park Rangers	Undisclosed
2 October 2020	Devante Cole	Doncaster Rovers	(Scotland) Motherwell	Free
2 October 2020	(Czech Republic) Vladimir Coufal	(Czech Republic) Slavia Prague	West Ham United	£5.4m
2 October 2020	(Sweden) Niclas Eliasson	Bristol City	(France) Nîmes	Undisclosed
2 October 2020	(France) Wesley Fofana	(France) Saint-Étienne	Leicester City	Undisclosed
2 October 2020	Danny Rose	Mansfield Town	Northampton Town	Undisclosed
2 October 2020	(Colombia) Luis Suarez	Watford	(Spain) Granada	£10m
3 October 2020	(Germany) Vitaly Janelt	(Germany) VfL Bochum	Brentford	Undisclosed
3 October 2020	(Scotland) Calvin Miller	(Scotland) Celtic	Harrogate Town	Free
3 October 2020	(Portugal) Tiago Silva	Nottingham Forest	(Greece) Olympiacos	Undisclosed
4 October 2020	(France) Rayan Aït-Nouri	(France) Angers	Wolverhampton Wanderers	Undisclosed
4 October 2020	(France) Ibrahima Diallo	(France) Brest	Southampton	Undisclosed
5 October 2020	Tosin Adarabioyo	Manchester City	Fulham	Undisclosed
5 October 2020	(Ghana) Albert Adomah	Nottingham Forest	Queens Park Rangers	Free
5 October 2020	(Scotland) Jack Aitchison	(Scotland) Celtic	Barnsley	Free
5 October 2020	(France) Sofiane Boufal	Southampton	(France) Angers	Free
5 October 2020	(Argentina) Guido Carrillo	Southampton	(Spain) Elche	Free
5 October 2020	(Uruguay) Edinson Cavani	(France) Paris Saint-Germain	Manchester United	Free
5 October 2020	(Republic of Ireland) Josh Cullen	West Ham United	(Belgium) Anderlecht	Undisclosed
5 October 2020	Ben Godfrey	Norwich City	Everton	£25m
5 October 2020	(Iceland) Daniel Gretarsson	(Norway) Aalesunds	Blackpool	Undisclosed
5 October 2020	Ashley Nathaniel-George	Crawley Town	Southend United	Undisclosed
5 October 2020	(Ghana) Thomas Partey	(Spain) Atlético Madrid	Arsenal	£45m
5 October 2020	(Uruguay) Facundo Pellistri	(Uruguay) Peñarol	Manchester United	£9m
5 October 2020	(Sweden) Kristoffer Peterson	(Wales) Swansea City	(Germany) Fortuna Düsseldorf	Undisclosed
5 October 2020	(Brazil) Raphinha	(France) Rennes	Leeds United	£17m
5 October 2020	(Spain) Sandro	Everton	(Spain) Huesca	Free
5 October 2020	Chris Smalling	Manchester United	(Italy) Roma	£13.6m
5 October 2020	Chris Taylor	Bradford City	Barrow	Free
5 October 2020	(Brazil) Alex Telles	(Portugal) Porto	Manchester United	£13.6m
5 October 2020	Chris Willock	(Portugal) Benfica	Queens Park Rangers	Undisclosed
6 October 2020	(Poland) Michał Karbownik	(Poland) Legia Warsaw	Brighton & Hove Albion	Undisclosed
6 October 2020	(Poland) Jakub Moder	(Poland) Lech Poznań	Brighton & Hove Albion	Undisclosed
6 October 2020	(Greece) Antonis Stergiakis	(Bulgaria) Slavia Sofia	Blackburn Rovers	Undisclosed

== Loans ==
Start date	End date	Name	Moving from	Moving to
1 February 2020	30 June 2021	(Netherlands) Jürgen Locadia	Brighton & Hove Albion	(United States) FC Cincinnati
30 June 2020	30 June 2021	(Norway) Mohamed Elyounoussi	Southampton	(Scotland) Celtic
1 July 2020	30 June 2021	(Belgium) Rocky Bushiri	Norwich City	(Belgium) KV Mechelen
1 July 2020	30 June 2021	(Brazil) Lucas Piazon	Chelsea	(Portugal) Rio Ave
2 July 2020	30 June 2021	Charlie Brown	Chelsea	(Belgium) Union SG
7 July 2020	30 June 2021	Nathan Sheron	Fleetwood Town	(Scotland) St Mirren
15 July 2020	30 June 2021	Zeno Ibsen Rossi	Bournemouth	(Scotland) Kilmarnock
16 July 2020	30 June 2021	(Belgium) Laurens De Bock	Leeds United	(Belgium) Zulte Waregem
16 July 2020	30 June 2021	(Greece) Konstantinos Mavropanos	Arsenal	(Germany) VfB Stuttgart
20 July 2020	30 June 2021	(Iceland) Ísak Þorvaldsson	Norwich City	(Scotland) St Mirren
21 July 2020	30 June 2021	(Northern Ireland) Ciaron Brown	(Wales) Cardiff City	(Scotland) Livingston
21 July 2020	30 June 2021	Ryan Giles	Wolverhampton Wanderers	Coventry City
24 July 2020	30 June 2021	Carlton Morris	Norwich City	MK Dons
27 July 2020	30 June 2021	Ryan Woods	Stoke City	Millwall
28 July 2020	30 June 2021	Luke Bolton	Manchester City	(Scotland) Dundee United
28 July 2020	30 June 2021	(Netherlands) Nathangelo Markelo	Everton	(Netherlands) Twente
28 July 2020	30 June 2021	Tom White	Blackburn Rovers	Bolton Wanderers
29 July 2020	30 June 2021	(Scotland) Ryan Hardie	Blackpool	Plymouth Argyle
29 July 2020	30 June 2021	Callum Lang	Wigan Athletic	(Scotland) Motherwell
30 July 2020	1 January 2021	Jake Eastwood	Sheffield United	(Scotland) Kilmarnock
31 July 2020	1 January 2021	Ryan Edmondson	Leeds United	(Scotland) Aberdeen
1 August 2020	30 June 2021	Finn Azaz	West Bromwich Albion	Cheltenham Town
1 August 2020	30 June 2021	(Republic of Ireland) Troy Parrott	Tottenham Hotspur	Millwall
3 August 2020	30 June 2021	Billy Crellin	Fleetwood Town	Bolton Wanderers
3 August 2020	30 June 2021	Scott High	Huddersfield Town	Shrewsbury Town
4 August 2020	30 June 2021	Jonathan Mitchell	Derby County	Northampton Town
4 August 2020	30 June 2021	Toby Sibbick	Barnsley	(Belgium) Oostende
4 August 2020	30 June 2021	Connal Trueman	Birmingham City	AFC Wimbledon
5 August 2020	30 June 2021	(Bulgaria) Kun Temenuzhkov	Leeds United	(Spain) Real Unión
5 August 2020	30 June 2021	Jake Turner	Newcastle United	Morecambe
6 August 2020	30 June 2021	Frank Vincent	Bournemouth	Scunthorpe United
7 August 2020	30 June 2021	Ryan Cassidy	Watford	Accrington Stanley
7 August 2020	30 June 2021	Ben Coker	Lincoln City	Stevenage
7 August 2020	30 June 2021	Robbie Cundy	Bristol City	Cambridge United
7 August 2020	30 June 2021	(Republic of Ireland) Ian Lawlor	Doncaster Rovers	Oldham Athletic
7 August 2020	30 June 2021	(Northern Ireland) Cameron McGeehan	Barnsley	(Belgium) KV Oostende
7 August 2020	30 June 2021	George Nurse	Bristol City	Walsall
10 August 2020	30 June 2021	Bobby Grant	(Wales) Wrexham	Oldham Athletic
10 August 2020	30 June 2021	Jack Harrison	Manchester City	Leeds United
10 August 2020	30 June 2021	(Northern Ireland) Lee Hodson	Gillingham	(Scotland) Hamilton Academical
10 August 2020	30 June 2021	Zech Medley	Arsenal	Gillingham
11 August 2020	30 June 2021	Ryan Cooney	Burnley	Morecambe
11 August 2020	30 June 2021	TJ Eyoma	Tottenham Hotspur	Lincoln City
12 August 2020	30 June 2021	(Wales) Morgan Boyes	Liverpool	Fleetwood Town
12 August 2020	30 June 2021	(Serbia) Danilo Pantić	Chelsea	(Serbia) Čukarički
12 August 2020	30 June 2021	Adam Phillips	Burnley	Morecambe
13 August 2020	30 June 2021	Tom Allan	Newcastle United	Accrington Stanley
13 August 2020	30 June 2021	Trae Coyle	Arsenal	Gillingham
13 August 2020	30 June 2021	Josh Griffiths	West Bromwich Albion	Cheltenham Town
13 August 2020	30 June 2021	(Finland) Jaakko Oksanen	Brentford	AFC Wimbledon
14 August 2020	30 June 2021	(Colombia) Cucho Hernández	Watford	(Spain) Getafe
15 August 2020	30 June 2021	Marcus McGuane	Nottingham Forest	Oxford United
16 August 2020	30 June 2021	(Netherlands) Tahith Chong	Manchester United	(Germany) Werder Bremen
16 August 2020	30 June 2021	Freddie Woodman	Newcastle United	(Wales) Swansea City
17 August 2020	31 May 2021	Jamie Cumming	Chelsea	Stevenage
17 August 2020	30 June 2021	(Germany) Kilian Ludewig	(Austria) Red Bull Salzburg	Barnsley
17 August 2020	30 June 2021	(Republic of Ireland) Lee O'Connor	(Scotland) Celtic	Tranmere Rovers
17 August 2020	30 June 2021	Oliver Skipp	Tottenham Hotspur	Norwich City
17 August 2020	30 June 2021	Matt Smith	Arsenal	Swindon Town
18 August 2020	30 June 2021	Trevor Chalobah	Chelsea	(France) Lorient
18 August 2020	30 June 2021	Adam Lewis	Liverpool	(France) Amiens
18 August 2020	30 June 2021	(Spain) Xavi Quintillà	(Spain) Villarreal	Norwich City
18 August 2020	30 June 2021	Louis Thompson	Norwich City	MK Dons
18 August 2020	30 June 2021	Ike Ugbo	Chelsea	(Belgium) Cercle Brugge
19 August 2020	30 June 2021	(Scotland) Calum Macdonald	Blackpool	Tranmere Rovers
20 August 2020	30 June 2021	(Guyana) Elliot Bonds	Hull City	Cheltenham Town
20 August 2020	31 May 2021	Izzy Brown	Chelsea	Sheffield Wednesday
20 August 2020	30 June 2021	Josef Bursik	Stoke City	Doncaster Rovers
20 August 2020	30 June 2021	Tyler Cordner	Bournemouth	Scunthorpe United
20 August 2020	1 January 2021	Jordan Green	Barnsley	Southend United
20 August 2020	30 June 2021	(Germany) Lukas Nmecha	Manchester City	(Belgium) Anderlecht
21 August 2020	30 June 2021	(Albania) Armando Broja	Chelsea	(Netherlands) Vitesse
21 August 2020	30 June 2021	(Republic of Ireland) Liam Kelly	(Netherlands) Feyenoord	Oxford United
21 August 2020	30 June 2021	(Republic of Ireland) Warren O'Hora	Brighton & Hove Albion	MK Dons
21 August 2020	30 June 2021	(Denmark) Luka Racic	Brentford	Northampton Town
22 August 2020	30 June 2021	(Wales) Marley Watkins	Bristol City	(Scotland) Aberdeen
23 August 2020	30 June 2021	(Azerbaijan) Renat Dadashov	Wolverhampton Wanderers	(Switzerland) Grasshopper
23 August 2020	30 June 2021	(Republic of Ireland) Connor Ronan	Wolverhampton Wanderers	(Switzerland) Grasshopper
24 August 2020	31 May 2021	Jamal Blackman	Chelsea	Rotherham United
24 August 2020	30 June 2021	Kelland Watts	Newcastle United	Plymouth Argyle
25 August 2020	30 June 2021	(Republic of Ireland) Gavin Bazunu	Manchester City	Rochdale
25 August 2020	30 June 2021	Morgan Gibbs-White	Wolverhampton Wanderers	(Wales) Swansea City
25 August 2020	30 June 2021	Jordi Osei-Tutu	Arsenal	(Wales) Cardiff City
25 August 2020	30 June 2021	Taylor Richards	Brighton & Hove Albion	Doncaster Rovers
26 August 2020	30 June 2021	Matt Clarke	Brighton & Hove Albion	Derby County
26 August 2020	31 May 2021	Marc Guehi	Chelsea	(Wales) Swansea City
26 August 2020	30 June 2021	Remeao Hutton	Birmingham City	Stevenage
26 August 2020	30 June 2021	Ryan Longman	Brighton & Hove Albion	AFC Wimbledon
27 August 2020	30 June 2021	(Norway) Leo Skiri Østigård	Brighton & Hove Albion	Coventry City
27 August 2020	30 June 2021	(Spain) Fran Villalba	Birmingham City	(Spain) Almería
27 August 2020	30 June 2021	Marcus Dewhurst	Sheffield United	Carlisle United
28 August 2020	30 June 2021	Harrison Biggins	Fleetwood Town	Barrow
28 August 2020	30 June 2021	(United States) Marlon Fossey	Fulham	Shrewsbury Town
28 August 2020	30 June 2021	Luke Freeman	Sheffield United	Nottingham Forest
28 August 2020	30 June 2021	(The Gambia) Saikou Janneh	Bristol City	(Wales) Newport County
28 August 2020	30 June 2021	(Czech Republic) Matěj Kovář	Manchester United	Swindon Town
28 August 2020	30 June 2021	Scott Malone	Derby County	Millwall
28 August 2020	30 June 2021	(Liberia) Mo Sangare	Newcastle United	Accrington Stanley
29 August 2020	30 June 2021	(Portugal) Joel Pereira	Manchester United	Huddersfield Town
29 August 2020	30 June 2021	Jonny Smith	Bristol City	Swindon Town
30 August 2020	30 June 2021	(Gabon) Mario Lemina	Southampton	Fulham
31 August 2020	30 June 2021	Joe Nuttall	Blackpool	Northampton Town
1 September 2020	30 June 2021	Glenn Murray	Brighton & Hove Albion	Watford
1 September 2020	30 June 2021	Cameron Pring	Bristol City	Portsmouth
2 September 2020	30 June 2021	(Republic of Ireland) Shane Duffy	Brighton & Hove Albion	(Scotland) Celtic
2 September 2020	30 June 2021	Ben Garrity	Blackpool	Oldham Athletic
2 September 2020	30 June 2021	Josh Ginnelly	Preston North End	(Scotland) Heart of Midlothian
2 September 2020	30 June 2021	Tom McGill	Brighton & Hove Albion	Crawley Town
2 September 2020	30 June 2021	(Montenegro) Matija Sarkic	Wolverhampton Wanderers	Shrewsbury Town
2 September 2020	30 June 2021	Jordan Thomas	Norwich City	Leyton Orient
3 September 2020	30 June 2021	(Guinea) Julian Jeanvier	Brentford	(Turkey) Kasımpaşa
3 September 2020	30 June 2021	Daniel Kemp	West Ham United	Blackpool
3 September 2020	30 June 2021	(Wales) Rhys Norrington-Davies	Sheffield United	Luton Town
3 September 2020	30 June 2021	Danny Preston	Nottingham Forest	Grimsby Town
4 September 2020	30 June 2021	(Spain) Dani Ceballos	(Spain) Real Madrid	Arsenal
4 September 2020	30 June 2021	Ben Gibson	Burnley	Norwich City
4 September 2020	30 June 2021	Callum Morton	West Bromwich Albion	Lincoln City
4 September 2020	30 June 2021	Alex Palmer	West Bromwich Albion	Lincoln City
4 September 2020	30 June 2021	Ben Sheaf	Arsenal	Coventry City
4 September 2020	30 June 2021	(Denmark) Lasse Sørensen	Stoke City	MK Dons
4 September 2020	30 June 2021	Martell Taylor-Crossdale	Fulham	Colchester United
5 September 2020	30 June 2021	Owura Edwards	Bristol City	Grimsby Town
6 September 2020	30 June 2021	Alfie Mawson	Fulham	Bristol City
7 September 2020	31 May 2021	(Wales) Ethan Ampadu	Chelsea	Sheffield United
7 September 2020	30 June 2021	(Wales) Brandon Cooper	(Wales) Swansea City	(Wales) Newport County
7 September 2020	30 June 2021	Sheyi Ojo	Liverpool	(Wales) Cardiff City
7 September 2020	30 June 2021	Steven Sessegnon	Fulham	Bristol City
7 September 2020	30 June 2021	Tariq Uwakwe	Chelsea	Accrington Stanley
7 September 2020	30 June 2021	(Ghana) Yeboah Amankwah	Manchester City	Rochdale
8 September 2020	30 June 2021	(Spain) Angeliño	Manchester City	(Germany) RB Leipzig
8 September 2020	30 June 2021	Dillon Barnes	Queen's Park Rangers	(Scotland) Hibernian
8 September 2020	30 June 2021	Tyreece John-Jules	Arsenal	Doncaster Rovers
8 September 2020	30 June 2021	(Portugal) Bruno Jordão	Wolverhampton Wanderers	(Portugal) Famalicão
8 September 2020	30 June 2021	(Brazil) Kenedy	Chelsea	(Spain) Granada
8 September 2020	30 June 2021	(Wales) Dylan Levitt	Manchester United	Charlton Athletic
8 September 2020	30 June 2021	(Wales) Terry Taylor	Wolverhampton Wanderers	Grimsby Town
9 September 2020	30 June 2021	(France) Alphonse Areola	(France) Paris Saint-Germain	Fulham
9 September 2020	30 June 2021	(Nigeria) Peter Etebo	Stoke City	(Turkey) Galatasaray
9 September 2020	30 June 2021	(Portugal) Vítor Ferreira	(Portugal) Porto	Wolverhampton Wanderers
10 September 2020	30 June 2021	(Belgium) Michy Batshuayi	Chelsea	Crystal Palace
10 September 2020	30 June 2021	Marcus Bettinelli	Fulham	Middlesbrough
10 September 2020	30 June 2021	(Scotland) Scott Robertson	(Scotland) Celtic	Gillingham
10 September 2020	30 June 2021	Arthur Read	Brentford	Stevenage
11 September 2020	30 June 2021	(Nigeria) Ola Aina	(Italy) Torino	Fulham
11 September 2020	30 June 2021	Dan Jones	Salford City	Harrogate Town
11 September 2020	30 June 2021	(Spain) Tomás Mejías	Middlesbrough	(Romania) Dinamo București
11 September 2020	30 June 2021	Rayhaan Tulloch	West Bromwich Albion	Doncaster Rovers
12 September 2020	30 June 2021	Ethan Walker	Preston North End	Carlisle United
16 September 2020	30 June 2021	(Sweden) Joel Asoro	(Wales) Swansea City	(Italy) Genoa
16 September 2020	30 June 2021	George Hirst	Leicester City	Rotherham United
16 September 2020	30 June 2021	(Ecuador) Joel Valencia	Brentford	(Poland) Legia Warsaw
17 September 2020	30 June 2021	(Democratic Republic of the Congo) Benik Afobe	Stoke City	(Turkey) Trabzonspor
17 September 2020	30 June 2021	Josh Eccles	Coventry City	Gillingham
17 September 2020	30 June 2021	Liam Feeney	Blackpool	Tranmere Rovers
17 September 2020	30 June 2021	Conor Gallagher	Chelsea	West Bromwich Albion
17 September 2020	17 January 2021	(Wales) Tom James	(Scotland) Hibernian	Wigan Athletic
17 September 2020	30 June 2021	(Cyprus) Jack Roles	Tottenham Hotspur	Burton Albion
17 September 2020	30 June 2021	(United States) Indiana Vassilev	Aston Villa	Burton Albion
18 September 2020	30 June 2021	Lewis Baker	Chelsea	(Turkey) Trabzonspor
18 September 2020	30 June 2021	(Republic of Ireland) Cyrus Christie	Fulham	Nottingham Forest
18 September 2020	30 June 2021	Shilow Tracey	Tottenham Hotspur	Shrewsbury Town
18 September 2020	30 June 2021	Bradley Webb	Bristol City	(Wales) Newport County
19 September 2020	30 June 2021	(Wales) Gareth Bale	(Spain) Real Madrid	Tottenham Hotspur
19 September 2020	30 June 2021	(Netherlands) Carel Eiting	(Netherlands) Ajax	Huddersfield Town
19 September 2020	30 June 2021	(Italy) Davide Zappacosta	Chelsea	(Italy) Genoa
20 September 2020	30 June 2021	(Turkey) Cengiz Ünder	(Italy) Roma	Leicester City
21 September 2020	30 June 2021	(Iran) Saman Ghoddos	(France) Amiens	Brentford
21 September 2020	30 June 2021	Luke McCormick	Chelsea	Bristol Rovers
21 September 2020	30 June 2021	Jordan Stevens	Leeds United	Swindon Town
22 September 2020	30 June 2022	(Brazil) Léo Bonatini	Wolverhampton Wanderers	(Switzerland) Grasshopper
22 September 2020	30 June 2021	(Tunisia) Idris El Mizouni	Ipswich Town	Cambridge United
22 September 2020	30 June 2021	Lewis Gibson	Everton	Reading
22 September 2020	30 June 2021	Mark McGuinness	Arsenal	Ipswich Town
22 September 2020	1 January 2021	Tom Sang	(Wales) Cardiff City	Cheltenham Town
23 September 2020	30 June 2021	(Denmark) Rasmus Nicolaisen	(Denmark) Midtjylland	Portsmouth
23 September 2020	30 June 2021	Jayden Richardson	Nottingham Forest	Forest Green Rovers
24 September 2020	30 June 2021	Hakeeb Adelakun	Bristol City	Hull City
24 September 2020	30 June 2021	Steve Seddon	Birmingham City	AFC Wimbledon
25 September 2020	30 June 2021	Dennis Adeniran	Everton	Wycombe Wanderers
25 September 2020	30 June 2021	Brennan Johnson	Nottingham Forest	Lincoln City
25 September 2020	30 June 2021	(Northern Ireland) Alfie McCalmont	Leeds United	Oldham Athletic
25 September 2020	30 June 2021	(Scotland) Barrie McKay	(Wales) Swansea City	Fleetwood Town
25 September 2020	30 June 2021	Jerome Opoku	Fulham	Plymouth Argyle
25 September 2020	30 June 2021	Kyle Taylor	Bournemouth	Southend United
25 September 2020	30 June 2021	(Tanzania) Mbwana Samatta	Aston Villa	(Turkey) Fenerbahçe
26 September 2020	30 June 2021	Akin Famewo	Norwich City	Charlton Athletic
28 September 2020	30 June 2021	Declan Drysdale	Coventry City	Gillingham
28 September 2020	30 June 2021	(Poland) Kamil Grabara	Liverpool	(Denmark) AGF
28 September 2020	30 June 2021	(Germany) Loris Karius	Liverpool	(Germany) Union Berlin
28 September 2020	30 June 2021	(Senegal) Badou Ndiaye	Stoke City	(Turkey) Fatih Karagümrük
29 September 2020	30 June 2021	(Portugal) João Carvalho	Nottingham Forest	(Spain) Almería
29 September 2020	30 June 2021	Bryce Hosannah	Leeds United	Bradford City
29 September 2020	30 June 2021	Darnell Johnson	Leicester City	Wigan Athletic
29 September 2020	30 June 2021	(Croatia) Filip Krovinovic	(Portugal) Benfica	West Bromwich Albion
30 September 2020	30 June 2021	Ross Barkley	Chelsea	Aston Villa
30 September 2020	30 June 2021	Ademola Lookman	(Germany) RB Leipzig	Fulham
30 September 2020	30 June 2021	James Morton	Bristol Rovers	Grimsby Town
30 September 2020	30 June 2021	Regan Slater	Sheffield United	Hull City
1 October 2020	30 June 2021	Jordan Gabriel	Nottingham Forest	Blackpool
1 October 2020	30 June 2021	(Spain) Rodrigo Riquelme	(Spain) Atlético Madrid	Bournemouth
1 October 2020	30 June 2021	Jake Taylor	Nottingham Forest	Scunthorpe United
2 October 2020	30 June 2021	Keanan Bennetts	(Germany) Borussia Mönchengladbach	Ipswich Town
2 October 2020	30 June 2021	Tyrese Fornah	Nottingham Forest	Plymouth Argyle
2 October 2020	1 January 2021	Connor Malley	Middlesbrough	Carlisle United
2 October 2020	30 June 2021	Jon Russell	Chelsea	Accrington Stanley
2 October 2020	30 June 2021	(Brazil) Carlos Vinicius	(Portugal) Benfica	Tottenham Hotspur
3 October 2020	30 June 2021	(United States) Matt Miazga	Chelsea	(Belgium) Anderlecht
4 October 2020	30 June 2021	(France) Rayan Aït-Nouri	(France) Angers	Wolverhampton Wanderers
4 October 2020	30 June 2021	(Portugal) Diogo Dalot	Manchester United	(Italy) Milan
4 October 2020	30 June 2021	(Guinea-Bissau) Alfa Semedo	(Portugal) Benfica	Reading
5 October 2020	30 June 2021	(Denmark) Joachim Andersen	(France) Lyon	Fulham
5 October 2020	30 June 2021	(France) Tiemoue Bakayoko	Chelsea	(Italy) Napoli
5 October 2020	1 January 2021	Daniel Ballard	Arsenal	Blackpool
5 October 2020	30 June 2021	(Portugal) Cafu	(Greece) Olympiacos	Nottingham Forest
5 October 2020	30 June 2021	(Cape Verde) Nuno da Costa	Nottingham Forest	(Belgium) Royal Excel Mouscron
5 October 2020	30 June 2021	(Spain) Gerard Deulofeu	Watford	(Italy) Udinese
5 October 2020	30 June 2021	(Portugal) Tomas Esteves	(Portugal) Porto	Reading
5 October 2020	30 June 2021	(Algeria) Rachid Ghezzal	Leicester City	(Turkey) Besiktas
5 October 2020	30 June 2021	(France) Matteo Guendouzi	Arsenal	(Germany) Hertha BSC
5 October 2020	30 June 2021	(Netherlands) Wesley Hoedt	Southampton	(Italy) Lazio
5 October 2020	1 January 2021	Josh Knight	Leicester City	Wycombe Wanderers
5 October 2020	30 June 2021	Charlie Lakin	Birmingham City	(Scotland) Ross County
5 October 2020	30 June 2021	Brandon Mason	Coventry City	(Scotland) St Mirren
5 October 2020	30 June 2021	(Australia) Riley McGree	(United States) Charlotte FC	Birmingham City
5 October 2020	30 June 2021	(Scotland) Marc McNulty	Reading	(Scotland) Dundee United
5 October 2020	30 June 2021	(Australia) Matt Millar	(Australia) Newcastle Jets	Shrewsbury Town
5 October 2020	30 June 2021	(Sweden) Robin Olsen	(Italy) Roma	Everton
5 October 2020	30 June 2021	(Venezuela) Adalberto Penaranda	Watford	(Bulgaria) CSKA Sofia
5 October 2020	30 June 2021	(Argentina) Ignacio Pussetto	Watford	(Italy) Udinese
5 October 2020	30 June 2021	(Austria) Marcel Ritzmaier	Barnsley	(Austria) Rapid Wien
5 October 2020	30 June 2021	(Portugal) Xande Silva	West Ham United	(Greece) Aris
5 October 2020	30 June 2021	Jerome Sinclair	Watford	(Bulgaria) CSKA Sofia
5 October 2020	30 June 2021	(Uruguay) Lucas Torreira	Arsenal	(Spain) Atlético Madrid
5 October 2020	30 June 2021	(Portugal) Ruben Vinagre	Wolverhampton Wanderers	(Greece) Olympiacos
5 October 2020	30 June 2021	Theo Walcott	Everton	Southampton
5 October 2020	1 January 2021	Gary Woods	Oldham Athletic	(Scotland) Aberdeen
5 October 2020	30 June 2021	(Czech Republic) Jan Zamburek	Brentford	Shrewsbury Town
6 October 2020	30 June 2021	(Scotland) Jack Aitchison	Barnsley	Stevenage
6 October 2020	30 June 2021	Olatunji Akinola	West Ham United	Leyton Orient
6 October 2020	30 June 2021	(Brazil) Felipe Anderson	West Ham United	(Portugal) Porto
6 October 2020	30 June 2021	(Romania) Tudor Baluta	Brighton & Hove Albion	(Ukraine) Dynamo Kyiv
6 October 2020	30 June 2021	(Netherlands) Juan Castillo	Chelsea	(Netherlands) AZ
6 October 2020	30 June 2021	(Turkey) Halil Dervisoglu	Brentford	(Netherlands) FC Twente
6 October 2020	30 June 2021	(Serbia) Marko Grujic	Liverpool	(Portugal) Porto
6 October 2020	30 June 2021	(Poland) Michal Karbownik	Brighton & Hove Albion	(Poland) Legia Warsaw
6 October 2020	30 June 2021	Ruben Loftus-Cheek	Chelsea	Fulham
6 October 2020	30 June 2021	(Netherlands) Bruno Martins Indi	Stoke City	(Netherlands) AZ
6 October 2020	30 June 2021	(Poland) Jakub Moder	Brighton & Hove Albion	(Poland) Lech Poznań
6 October 2020	30 June 2021	(France) Malang Sarr	Chelsea	(Portugal) Porto
6 October 2020	30 June 2021	(Netherlands) Marco van Ginkel	Chelsea	(Netherlands) PSV Eindhoven
