= List of Cypriot football transfers winter 2012–13 =

This is a list of Cypriot football transfers for the 2012–13 winter transfer window by club. Only transfers of clubs in the Cypriot First Division and Cypriot Second Division are included.

The winter transfer window opened on 1 January 2013, although a few transfers took place prior to that date. The window will close at midnight on 31 January 2013. Players without a club may join one at any time, either during or in between transfer windows.

== Cypriot First Division ==
=== AEK Larnaca ===
In: Note: Flags indicate national team as defined under FIFA eligibility rules; some limited exceptions apply. Players may hold more than one non-FIFA nationality.

No.	Pos.	Nation	Player
22	DF	MKD	Yani Urdinov (from (Lithuania) FK Ekranas)
88	MF	BRA	Mércio (from Olympiakos Nicosia)
9	FW	ESP	Chando (from (Spain) Real Murcia)
13	MF	ESP	Joan Tomás (from (Spain) Celta de Vigo)
37	DF	NED	Serginho Greene (on loan from (Serbia) FK Vojvodina)

Out: Note: Flags indicate national team as defined under FIFA eligibility rules; some limited exceptions apply. Players may hold more than one non-FIFA nationality.

No.	Pos.	Nation	Player
17	MF	CAN	Issey Nakajima-Farran (on loan to Alki Larnaca)
8	MF	NED	Tom Daemen (on loan to Enosis Neon Paralimni)
28	FW	CRO	Ivan Antolek (to (Croatia) HNK Gorica)
21	MF	ESP	Igor Gabilondo (released)
22	DF	MKD	Yani Urdinov (to (Bosnia and Herzegovina) Željezničar)

=== AEL Limassol ===
In: Note: Flags indicate national team as defined under FIFA eligibility rules; some limited exceptions apply. Players may hold more than one non-FIFA nationality.

No.	Pos.	Nation	Player
55	MF	ARG	Esteban Sachetti (on loan from Doxa Katokopias)
94	FW	GHA	Carlos Ohene (from Alki Larnaca)
37	DF	UKR	Maksym Ilchysh (from (Ukraine) Vorskla Poltava II)

Out: Note: Flags indicate national team as defined under FIFA eligibility rules; some limited exceptions apply. Players may hold more than one non-FIFA nationality.

No.	Pos.	Nation	Player
84	FW	GHA	Chris Dickson (to (China) Shanghai East Asia)

=== AEP Paphos ===
In: Note: Flags indicate national team as defined under FIFA eligibility rules; some limited exceptions apply. Players may hold more than one non-FIFA nationality.

No.	Pos.	Nation	Player
42	MF	POR	Edgar Marcelino (from (Morocco) KAC Marrakech)
72	FW	BUL	Kostadin Bashov (from (Bulgaria) PFC Litex Lovech)
15	GK	ALB	Dimitri Prifti (on loan from (Greece) AEL)
48	MF	CYP	Giorgos Sielis (from Anorthosis)

Out: Note: Flags indicate national team as defined under FIFA eligibility rules; some limited exceptions apply. Players may hold more than one non-FIFA nationality.

No.	Pos.	Nation	Player
22	MF	GRE	Pashalis Melissas (to (Greece) Panetolikos)
9	MF	GRE	Dimitrios Kiliaras (to (Greece) Panachaiki)
29	DF	GRE	Dimitris Petkakis (to (Greece) Olympiacos Volos)
27	FW	BRA	Andrezinho (to (Brazil) Campinense)
81	DF	CYP	Loizos Kakoyiannis (to Aris Limassol)
10	MF	POR	Silas (to Ethnikos Achna)
12	FW	BRA	Saulo (released)
11	FW	ANG	Aguinaldo (loan return to (Angola) C.R.D. Libolo)
33	GK	ESP	Manolo Reina (to (Greece) Atromitos)
44	DF	POR	Hugo Sousa (released)
50	FW	BRA	Serjão (to (Brazil) União Frederiquense)
17	DF	POR	Cris (released)
31	MF	BIH	Vladan Grujić (to (Bosnia and Herzegovina) Borac Banja Luka)
23	DF	BRA	Balú (released)

=== Alki Larnaca ===
In: Note: Flags indicate national team as defined under FIFA eligibility rules; some limited exceptions apply. Players may hold more than one non-FIFA nationality.

No.	Pos.	Nation	Player
89	MF	ANG	Stélvio (from (Angola) C.R. Caála)
84	MF	CAN	Issey Nakajima-Farran (on loan from AEK Larnaca)
30	MF	BRA	Eduardo Pincelli (from Nea Salamina)
81	DF	SRB	Marjan Marković (from (Kazakhstan) FC Kaisar)

Out: Note: Flags indicate national team as defined under FIFA eligibility rules; some limited exceptions apply. Players may hold more than one non-FIFA nationality.

No.	Pos.	Nation	Player
6	DF	ITA	Bruno Cirillo (to (France) FC Metz)
21	MF	ESP	Cristian Hidalgo (to (Bulgaria) Cherno More Varna)
11	FW	ESP	Arnal Conde (to Ethnikos Achna)
94	FW	GHA	Carlos Ohene (to AEL Limassol)
26	MF	ZIM	Noel Kaseke (to (United Arab Emirates) Al-Shaab)

=== Anorthosis ===
In: Note: Flags indicate national team as defined under FIFA eligibility rules; some limited exceptions apply. Players may hold more than one non-FIFA nationality.

No.	Pos.	Nation	Player
80	DF	POR	Rui Duarte (from (Romania) Rapid București)
30	MF	CYP	Andreas Avraam (from Omonia)
44	DF	ROU	George Galamaz (from (Romania) Petrolul Ploiești)

Out: Note: Flags indicate national team as defined under FIFA eligibility rules; some limited exceptions apply. Players may hold more than one non-FIFA nationality.

No.	Pos.	Nation	Player
22	DF	POR	Pedro Almeida (released)
1	GK	MNE	Srđan Blažić (on loan to Nea Salamina)
88	DF	BRA	William Boaventura (retired)
27	FW	ROU	Emil Jula (loan return to (Germany) MSV Duisburg)
18	MF	CYP	Giorgos Sielis (to AEP Paphos)

=== APOEL ===
In: Note: Flags indicate national team as defined under FIFA eligibility rules; some limited exceptions apply. Players may hold more than one non-FIFA nationality.

No.	Pos.	Nation	Player
90	MF	DEN	Mikkel Beckmann (from (Denmark) FC Nordsjælland)
16	FW	ISR	Dudu Biton (on loan from (Belgium) Standard Liège)

Out: Note: Flags indicate national team as defined under FIFA eligibility rules; some limited exceptions apply. Players may hold more than one non-FIFA nationality.

No.	Pos.	Nation	Player
9	FW	ARG	Esteban Solari (to Apollon Limassol)
31	MF	POR	Hélder Sousa (to (Portugal) C.D. Trofense)

=== Apollon Limassol ===
In: Note: Flags indicate national team as defined under FIFA eligibility rules; some limited exceptions apply. Players may hold more than one non-FIFA nationality.

No.	Pos.	Nation	Player
4	MF	ARG	Horacio Cardozo (from (Chile) Colo-Colo)
20	FW	ROU	Romeo Surdu (from (Romania) Rapid București)
32	FW	ARG	Esteban Solari (from APOEL)
77	MF	CYP	Dimitris Froxylias (free agent)

Out: Note: Flags indicate national team as defined under FIFA eligibility rules; some limited exceptions apply. Players may hold more than one non-FIFA nationality.

No.	Pos.	Nation	Player
14	DF	ESP	Iván Amaya (to (Spain) San Sebastián Reyes)
19	MF	ARG	Sebastián Setti (to (Greece) Asteras Tripolis)
34	DF	CYP	Ioannis Efstathiou (on loan to AEZ Zakakiou)
30	FW	CPV	Dady (to (China) Shanghai Shenhua)

=== Ayia Napa ===
In: Note: Flags indicate national team as defined under FIFA eligibility rules; some limited exceptions apply. Players may hold more than one non-FIFA nationality.

No.	Pos.	Nation	Player
55	MF	POR	Miguel Vargas (free agent)

Out: Note: Flags indicate national team as defined under FIFA eligibility rules; some limited exceptions apply. Players may hold more than one non-FIFA nationality.

No.	Pos.	Nation	Player
11	FW	POR	Riera (released)
26	MF	POR	Marquinhos (to AEK Kouklia)
22	GK	POL	Maciej Zając (to Anagennisi Dherynia)

=== Doxa Katokopias ===
In: Note: Flags indicate national team as defined under FIFA eligibility rules; some limited exceptions apply. Players may hold more than one non-FIFA nationality.

No.	Pos.	Nation	Player
77	FW	NGA	Kabiru Akinsola (on loan from (Spain) Granada CF)
2	DF	ESP	Juan Pedro Pina (from (Spain) UCAM Murcia)
18	MF	SRB	Semir Hadžibulić (from (Serbia) FK Novi Pazar)
12	GK	CYP	Michalis Morfis (from Anagennisi Dherynia)

Out: Note: Flags indicate national team as defined under FIFA eligibility rules; some limited exceptions apply. Players may hold more than one non-FIFA nationality.

No.	Pos.	Nation	Player
16	FW	FRA	Amick Ciani (released)
5	MF	ARG	Esteban Sachetti (on loan to AEL Limassol)
44	MF	CIV	Lamine N'dao (on loan to Olympiakos Nicosia)
1	GK	BRA	Felipe (to (Brazil) Paulista)

=== Enosis Neon Paralimni ===
In: Note: Flags indicate national team as defined under FIFA eligibility rules; some limited exceptions apply. Players may hold more than one non-FIFA nationality.

No.	Pos.	Nation	Player
28	MF	NED	Tom Daemen (on loan from AEK Larnaca)
15	MF	POR	Zé Vítor (from (Greece) Veria)
9	FW	SRB	Miljan Mrdaković (from (China) Jiangsu Sainty)
88	MF	MNE	Radovan Krivokapić (from (Greece) Iraklis)

Out: Note: Flags indicate national team as defined under FIFA eligibility rules; some limited exceptions apply. Players may hold more than one non-FIFA nationality.

No.	Pos.	Nation	Player
13	MF	ARG	Aldo Duscher (to (Greece) Veria)
42	MF	BRA	Leonardo (to (Ukraine) Metalurh Donetsk)
7	MF	SVN	Dejan Krljanović (to Omonia Aradippou)
10	MF	POR	Filipe da Costa (to (Greece) Panserraikos)
11	FW	CYP	Onisiforos Roushias (to Omonia)

=== Ethnikos Achna ===
In: Note: Flags indicate national team as defined under FIFA eligibility rules; some limited exceptions apply. Players may hold more than one non-FIFA nationality.

No.	Pos.	Nation	Player
53	DF	CRO	Ernad Skulić (from (Croatia) NK Lučko)
24	FW	ESP	Arnal Conde (from Alki Larnaca)
25	DF	CRO	Vinko Buden (from (Croatia) NK Lučko)
20	MF	POR	Silas (from AEP Paphos)

Out: Note: Flags indicate national team as defined under FIFA eligibility rules; some limited exceptions apply. Players may hold more than one non-FIFA nationality.

No.	Pos.	Nation	Player
5	DF	BRA	Allyson (released)
8	MF	POR	Oliveira (to (Angola) Bravos do Marquis)
4	MF	MAR	Abdelkarim Kissi (to (Morocco) Widad Fez)
32	DF	GRE	Nikos Arabatzis (to (Greece) Panetolikos)
88	MF	GLP	Matthieu Bemba (to (France) UJA Maccabi)
39	FW	CYP	Andreas Pittaras (to Ermis Aradippou)
13	MF	NGA	Waheed Oseni (to (Saudi Arabia) Al-Taawon)

=== Nea Salamina ===
In: Note: Flags indicate national team as defined under FIFA eligibility rules; some limited exceptions apply. Players may hold more than one non-FIFA nationality.

No.	Pos.	Nation	Player
16	MF	MKD	Armend Alimi (from (Sweden) Örebro SK)
77	MF	SVN	Enes Rujović (from (Slovenia) NK Krka)
32	GK	MNE	Srđan Blažić (on loan from Anorthosis)
82	FW	SRB	Vuk Sotirović (from (Serbia) FK BSK Borča)

Out: Note: Flags indicate national team as defined under FIFA eligibility rules; some limited exceptions apply. Players may hold more than one non-FIFA nationality.

No.	Pos.	Nation	Player
4	DF	BRA	Rodrigo Ribeiro (released)
1	GK	POL	Maciej Czyzniewski (to Akritas Chlorakas)
29	GK	HUN	Zoltán Kovács (released)
9	FW	CPV	José Semedo (released)
25	FW	CPV	Pedro Moreira (to (Portugal) Naval 1º de Maio)
23	MF	CYP	Michalis Demetriou (released)
8	MF	GRE	Christos Chatzipantelidis (to (Greece) Olympiacos Volos)
2	MF	BRA	Eduardo Pincelli (to Alki Larnaca)
21	DF	CYP	Periklis Moustakas (to (Australia) Sutherland Sharks)

=== Olympiakos Nicosia ===
In: Note: Flags indicate national team as defined under FIFA eligibility rules; some limited exceptions apply. Players may hold more than one non-FIFA nationality.

No.	Pos.	Nation	Player
35	DF	NGA	Jamiu Alimi (from (Ukraine) Tavriya Simferopol)
73	FW	ITA	Gaetano Monachello (from (Ukraine) Metalurh Donetsk)
24	MF	CIV	Lamine N'Dao (on loan from Doxa Katokopias)
2	DF	ESP	Manolo Gaspar (free agent)

Out: Note: Flags indicate national team as defined under FIFA eligibility rules; some limited exceptions apply. Players may hold more than one non-FIFA nationality.

No.	Pos.	Nation	Player
22	GK	SVN	Gregor Šmajd (released)
14	MF	SVN	Luka Pavlin (released)
12	FW	BRA	Cesinha (released)
5	DF	CGO	Lucien Aubey (released)
78	MF	NGA	Sani Kaita (released)
70	MF	ESP	Mario Martínez (to (Azerbaijan) FC Baku)
8	MF	BRA	Mércio (to AEK Larnaca)
15	FW	NGA	Chidi Onyemah (to (Greece) Platanias)
17	DF	POR	Tiago Costa (to (Israel) Hapoel Tel Aviv)

=== Omonia ===
In: Note: Flags indicate national team as defined under FIFA eligibility rules; some limited exceptions apply. Players may hold more than one non-FIFA nationality.

No.	Pos.	Nation	Player
8	FW	CYP	Onisiforos Roushias (from Enosis Neon Paralimni)
31	GK	POR	José Moreira (free agent)

Out: Note: Flags indicate national team as defined under FIFA eligibility rules; some limited exceptions apply. Players may hold more than one non-FIFA nationality.

No.	Pos.	Nation	Player
4	DF	MNE	Savo Pavićević (to (Israel) Hapoel Tel Aviv)
11	MF	CYP	Andreas Avraam (to Anorthosis Famagusta)
1	GK	SUI	Johnny Leoni (on loan to (Azerbaijan) Neftchi Baku)

== Cypriot Second Division ==
=== AEK Kouklia ===
In: Note: Flags indicate national team as defined under FIFA eligibility rules; some limited exceptions apply. Players may hold more than one non-FIFA nationality.

No.	Pos.	Nation	Player
26	MF	POR	Marquinhos (from Ayia Napa)
40	FW	POR	Ângelo (from Chalkanoras Idaliou)

Out: Note: Flags indicate national team as defined under FIFA eligibility rules; some limited exceptions apply. Players may hold more than one non-FIFA nationality.

No.	Pos.	Nation	Player
17	MF	CPV	Bruno Spencer (to PAEEK FC)
21	FW	POR	Hardy Pinto (to Omonia Aradippou)

=== AEZ Zakakiou ===
In: Note: Flags indicate national team as defined under FIFA eligibility rules; some limited exceptions apply. Players may hold more than one non-FIFA nationality.

No.	Pos.	Nation	Player
—	DF	CYP	Ioannis Efstathiou (on loan from Apollon Limassol)
—	MF	NGA	Temitope Adeniji (from Akritas Chlorakas)

Out: Note: Flags indicate national team as defined under FIFA eligibility rules; some limited exceptions apply. Players may hold more than one non-FIFA nationality.

No.	Pos.	Nation	Player

=== Akritas Chloraka ===
In: Note: Flags indicate national team as defined under FIFA eligibility rules; some limited exceptions apply. Players may hold more than one non-FIFA nationality.

No.	Pos.	Nation	Player
—	GK	POL	Maciej Czyzniewski (from Nea Salamina)

Out: Note: Flags indicate national team as defined under FIFA eligibility rules; some limited exceptions apply. Players may hold more than one non-FIFA nationality.

No.	Pos.	Nation	Player
40	MF	SWE	Nino Osmanagić (to Anagennisi Dherynia)
17	MF	NED	Luciano Dompig (to Aris Limassol)
5	DF	GRE	Theodoros Galanis (to ENAD Polis Chrysochous)
14	MF	NGA	Temitope Adeniji (to AEZ Zakakiou)

=== Anagennisi Dherynia ===
In: Note: Flags indicate national team as defined under FIFA eligibility rules; some limited exceptions apply. Players may hold more than one non-FIFA nationality.

No.	Pos.	Nation	Player
15	MF	SWE	Nino Osmanagić (from Akritas Chlorakas)
78	GK	POL	Maciej Zając (from Ayia Napa)

Out: Note: Flags indicate national team as defined under FIFA eligibility rules; some limited exceptions apply. Players may hold more than one non-FIFA nationality.

No.	Pos.	Nation	Player
1	GK	CYP	Michalis Morfis (to Doxa Katokopias)
9	FW	POR	Bonifácio (to (North Macedonia) FK Vardar)

=== APEP Pitsilia ===
In: Note: Flags indicate national team as defined under FIFA eligibility rules; some limited exceptions apply. Players may hold more than one non-FIFA nationality.

No.	Pos.	Nation	Player
—	MF	ESP	Juanjo (from Aris Limassol)

Out: Note: Flags indicate national team as defined under FIFA eligibility rules; some limited exceptions apply. Players may hold more than one non-FIFA nationality.

No.	Pos.	Nation	Player

=== Aris Limassol ===
In: Note: Flags indicate national team as defined under FIFA eligibility rules; some limited exceptions apply. Players may hold more than one non-FIFA nationality.

No.	Pos.	Nation	Player
81	DF	CYP	Loizos Kakoyiannis (from AEP Paphos)
21	MF	NED	Luciano Dompig (from Akritas Chlorakas)

Out: Note: Flags indicate national team as defined under FIFA eligibility rules; some limited exceptions apply. Players may hold more than one non-FIFA nationality.

No.	Pos.	Nation	Player
19	DF	CYP	Kyriakos Pelendritis (released)
10	MF	ESP	Juanjo (to APEP)

=== Chalkanoras Idaliou ===
In: Note: Flags indicate national team as defined under FIFA eligibility rules; some limited exceptions apply. Players may hold more than one non-FIFA nationality.

No.	Pos.	Nation	Player
33	MF	CYP	Panayiotis Efthymiades (from Ethnikos Assia)

Out: Note: Flags indicate national team as defined under FIFA eligibility rules; some limited exceptions apply. Players may hold more than one non-FIFA nationality.

No.	Pos.	Nation	Player
10	FW	CYP	Kyriacos Chailis (released)
22	FW	POR	Ângelo (to AEK Kouklia)
20	MF	CYP	Christos Panayiotou (to Othellos Athienou)
22	MF	CYP	Feidias Panayiotou (to Ethnikos Assia)

=== Ermis Aradippou ===
In: Note: Flags indicate national team as defined under FIFA eligibility rules; some limited exceptions apply. Players may hold more than one non-FIFA nationality.

No.	Pos.	Nation	Player
2	MF	CYP	Stelios Demetriou (from (Bulgaria) Lokomotiv Plovdiv)
19	FW	CYP	Andreas Pittaras (from Ethnikos Achna)

Out: Note: Flags indicate national team as defined under FIFA eligibility rules; some limited exceptions apply. Players may hold more than one non-FIFA nationality.

No.	Pos.	Nation	Player

=== Ethnikos Assia ===
In: Note: Flags indicate national team as defined under FIFA eligibility rules; some limited exceptions apply. Players may hold more than one non-FIFA nationality.

No.	Pos.	Nation	Player
—	MF	CYP	Feidias Panayiotou (from Chalkanoras Idaliou)

Out: Note: Flags indicate national team as defined under FIFA eligibility rules; some limited exceptions apply. Players may hold more than one non-FIFA nationality.

No.	Pos.	Nation	Player
1	GK	CYP	Nikolas Asprogenis (released)
10	MF	CYP	Panayiotis Efthymiades (to Chalkanoras Idaliou)
20	DF	GRE	Nikos Koliokostas (to Kissos FC Kissonergas)

=== Nikos & Sokratis Erimis ===
In: Note: Flags indicate national team as defined under FIFA eligibility rules; some limited exceptions apply. Players may hold more than one non-FIFA nationality.

No.	Pos.	Nation	Player

Out: Note: Flags indicate national team as defined under FIFA eligibility rules; some limited exceptions apply. Players may hold more than one non-FIFA nationality.

No.	Pos.	Nation	Player

=== Omonia Aradippou ===
In: Note: Flags indicate national team as defined under FIFA eligibility rules; some limited exceptions apply. Players may hold more than one non-FIFA nationality.

No.	Pos.	Nation	Player
—	MF	SVN	Dejan Krljanović (from Enosis Neon Paralimni)
—	FW	POR	Hardy Pinto (from AEK Kouklia)

Out: Note: Flags indicate national team as defined under FIFA eligibility rules; some limited exceptions apply. Players may hold more than one non-FIFA nationality.

No.	Pos.	Nation	Player
44	MF	EST	Deniss Malov (to ASPIS Pylas)
7	MF	POR	Ludgero Silveira (to Onisilos Sotira)

=== Onisilos Sotira ===
In: Note: Flags indicate national team as defined under FIFA eligibility rules; some limited exceptions apply. Players may hold more than one non-FIFA nationality.

No.	Pos.	Nation	Player
77	MF	POR	Ludgero Silveira (from Omonia Aradippou)

Out: Note: Flags indicate national team as defined under FIFA eligibility rules; some limited exceptions apply. Players may hold more than one non-FIFA nationality.

No.	Pos.	Nation	Player
—	DF	CYP	Michalis Michael (to AEN Ayiou Georgiou)
33	DF	CYP	Vasilis Papageorgiou (to Frenaros FC)

=== Othellos Athienou ===
In: Note: Flags indicate national team as defined under FIFA eligibility rules; some limited exceptions apply. Players may hold more than one non-FIFA nationality.

No.	Pos.	Nation	Player
—	MF	CYP	Christos Panayiotou (from Chalkanoras Idaliou)
8	FW	POR	Milton (free agent)

Out: Note: Flags indicate national team as defined under FIFA eligibility rules; some limited exceptions apply. Players may hold more than one non-FIFA nationality.

No.	Pos.	Nation	Player
19	FW	CYP	Tziovannis Siepis (to Frenaros FC)

=== PAEEK FC ===
In: Note: Flags indicate national team as defined under FIFA eligibility rules; some limited exceptions apply. Players may hold more than one non-FIFA nationality.

No.	Pos.	Nation	Player
99	FW	ITA	Harley Bernardi (free agent)
46	MF	CPV	Bruno Spencer (from AEK Kouklia)

Out: Note: Flags indicate national team as defined under FIFA eligibility rules; some limited exceptions apply. Players may hold more than one non-FIFA nationality.

No.	Pos.	Nation	Player
8	MF	GRE	Dimitrios Toskas (to (Greece) Panionios)
11	FW	MAR	Hicham Chirouf (to (France) US Sarre-Union)

== See also ==
- (Bulgaria) List of Bulgarian football transfers winter 2012–13
- (Netherlands) List of Dutch football transfers winter 2012–13
- (England) List of English football transfers winter 2012–13
- (Malta) List of Maltese football transfers winter 2012–13
- (Germany) List of German football transfers winter 2012–13
- (Greece) List of Greek football transfers winter 2012–13
- (Portugal) List of Portuguese football transfers winter 2012–13
- (Spain) List of Spanish football transfers winter 2012–13
- (Latvia) List of Latvian football transfers winter 2012-13
- (Serbia) List of Serbian football transfers winter 2012-13
