= Kevin Ruiz =

Kevin Ruiz may refer to:

- Kevin Ruiz (footballer, born 1991), German footballer
- Kevin Ruiz (footballer, born 1995), Guatemalan footballer
