= List of German football transfers winter 2012–13 =

This is a list of German football transfers in the winter 2012–13 transfer window by club. Only transfers of the Bundesliga, and 2. Bundesliga are included.

== Bundesliga ==
Note: Flags indicate national team as has been defined under FIFA eligibility rules. Players may hold more than one non-FIFA nationality.

=== Borussia Dortmund ===
In:

Out:

No.	Pos.	Nation	Player
18	MF	TUR	Nuri Şahin (on loan from Real Madrid)

No.	Pos.	Nation	Player
14	FW	CRO	Ivan Perišić (to VfL Wolfsburg)
24	DF	GER	Chris Löwe (to 1. FC Kaiserslautern)

=== FC Bayern Munich ===
In:

No.	Pos.	Nation	Player

Out:

No.	Pos.	Nation	Player
23	MF	GER	Mitchell Weiser (on loan to 1. FC Kaiserslautern)

=== FC Schalke 04 ===
In:

No.	Pos.	Nation	Player
9	MF	BRA	Michel Bastos (on loan from Olympique Lyonnais)
16	FW	BRA	Edu (loan return from SpVgg Greuther Fürth)
18	FW	BRA	Raffael (on loan from Dynamo Kyiv)
30	MF	GER	René Klingenburg (from FC Schalke II)

Out:

No.	Pos.	Nation	Player
3	DF	ESP	Sergio Escudero (on loan to Getafe CF)
10	MF	GER	Lewis Holtby (to Tottenham Hotspur F.C.)

=== Borussia Mönchengladbach ===
In:

No.	Pos.	Nation	Player
--	FW	GER	Sven Michel (from Sportfreunde Siegen)

Out:

No.	Pos.	Nation	Player
2	DF	GER	Matthias Zimmermann (on loan to SpVgg Greuther Fürth)
--	FW	GER	Elias Kachunga (on loan to SC Paderborn 07, previously on loan at Hertha BSC)

=== Bayer 04 Leverkusen ===
In:

No.	Pos.	Nation	Player
16	FW	POL	Arkadiusz Milik (from Górnik Zabrze)

Out:

No.	Pos.	Nation	Player
10	MF	BRA	Renato Augusto (to Corinthians)
23	DF	BRA	Carlinhos (on loan to Jahn Regensburg)
--	MF	CRO	Zvonko Pamić (to Dinamo Zagreb, previously on loan at MSV Duisburg)

=== VfB Stuttgart ===
In:

No.	Pos.	Nation	Player
3	DF	BRA	Felipe Lopes (on loan from VfL Wolfsburg)
14	FW	ITA	Federico Macheda (on loan from Manchester United)
44	MF	ROU	Alexandru Maxim (from CS Pandurii Târgu Jiu)
--	GK	SRB	Rastko Suljagić (from Red Star Belgrade youth)

Out:

No.	Pos.	Nation	Player
8	MF	SRB	Zdravko Kuzmanović (to Inter Milan)
14	DF	MEX	Francisco Javier Rodríguez (to Club América)

=== Hannover 96 ===
In:

No.	Pos.	Nation	Player
--	MF	GER	Andre Hoffmann (from MSV Duisburg)
--	DF	SUI	Johan Djourou (on loan from Arsenal F.C.)
--	MF	BRA	França (from Noroeste, previously on loan at Criciúma)

Out:

No.	Pos.	Nation	Player
--	MF	NOR	Henning Hauger (to IF Elfsborg, previously on loan Lillestrøm SK)

=== VfL Wolfsburg ===
In:

No.	Pos.	Nation	Player
9	FW	CRO	Ivan Perišić (from Borussia Dortmund)
--	FW	FRA	Giovanni Sio (loan return from FC Augsburg)

Out:

No.	Pos.	Nation	Player
3	DF	BRA	Felipe Lopes (on loan to VfB Stuttgart)
22	MF	POL	Mateusz Klich (on loan to PEC Zwolle)
23	DF	GER	Marco Russ (on loan to Eintracht Frankfurt)

=== Werder Bremen ===
In:

No.	Pos.	Nation	Player
--	DF	CRO	Mateo Pavlović (from NK Zagreb)

Out:

No.	Pos.	Nation	Player
3	DF	SUI	François Affolter (loan return to BSC Young Boys)
25	MF	GER	Florian Trinks (to SpVgg Greuther Fürth)

=== 1. FC Nürnberg ===
In:

No.	Pos.	Nation	Player
28	MF	JPN	Mu Kanazaki (form Nagoya Grampus)
--	DF	GER	Berkay Dabanlı (from Kayserispor)
20	MF	AUT	Muhammed Ildiz (from Rapid Wien)

Out:

No.	Pos.	Nation	Player
35	MF	GER	Philipp Klement (on loan to Hansa Rostock)

=== TSG 1899 Hoffenheim ===
In:

No.	Pos.	Nation	Player
25	DF	PER	Luis Advincula (from SC Tavriya Simferopol)
34	GK	BRA	Heurelho Gomes (on loan from Tottenham Hotspur F.C.)
--	DF	ARG	David Abraham (from Getafe CF)
--	MF	POL	Eugen Polanski (from 1. FSV Mainz 05)
--	MF	GHA	Afriyie Acquah (from U.S. Palermo, previously on loan at Parma F.C.)

Out:

No.	Pos.	Nation	Player
--	DF	GER	Marvin Compper (to Fiorentina)
34	MF	GER	Denis Streker (on loan to Dynamo Dresden)

=== SC Freiburg ===
In:

No.	Pos.	Nation	Player
--	FW	GER	Hendrick Zuck (from 1. FC Kaiserslautern)

Out:

No.	Pos.	Nation	Player

=== 1. FSV Mainz 05 ===
In:

No.	Pos.	Nation	Player
35	FW	CRO	Petar Slišković (loan return from Dynamo Dresden)
--	MF	DEN	Niki Zimling (from Club Brugge K.V.)

Out:

No.	Pos.	Nation	Player
7	MF	POL	Eugen Polanski (to 1899 Hoffenheim)
--	DF	GER	Malik Fathi (to TSV 1860 München, previously on loan at Kayserispor)

=== FC Augsburg ===
In:

No.	Pos.	Nation	Player
22	MF	CMR	Somen Tchoyi (from West Bromwich Albion F.C.)
24	DF	USA	Michael Parkhurst (from FC Nordsjælland)
27	FW	KOR	Ji Dong-Won (on loan from Sunderland A.F.C.)
28	MF	GER	André Hahn (from Kickers Offenbach)

Out:

No.	Pos.	Nation	Player
22	FW	FRA	Giovanni Sio (loan return to VfL Wolfsburg)

=== Hamburger SV ===
In:

No.	Pos.	Nation	Player

Out:

No.	Pos.	Nation	Player
12	GK	GER	Tom Mickel (to SpVgg Greuther Fürth)
13	MF	GER	Robert Tesche (on loan to Fortuna Düsseldorf)
20	DF	AUT	Paul Scharner (on loan to Wigan Athletic F.C.)

=== SpVgg Greuther Fürth ===
In:

No.	Pos.	Nation	Player
27	MF	GER	Florian Trinks (from Werder Bremen)
--	FW	SRB	Nikola Đurđić (from FK Haugesund, previously on loan at Helsingborgs IF)
--	FW	NGA	Kingsley Onuegbu (loan return from SV Sandhausen)
--	DF	GER	Matthias Zimmermann (on loan from Borussia Mönchengladbach)
--	GK	GER	Tom Mickel (from Hamburger SV)
--	FW	KOR	Park Jung-Bin (on loan from VfL Wolfsburg II)
--	MF	HUN	József Varga (on loan from Debreceni VSC)

Out:

No.	Pos.	Nation	Player
4	DF	GER	Kevin Kraus (on loan to 1. FC Heidenheim)
16	FW	BRA	Edu (loan return to FC Schalke 04)
27	FW	DEN	Tobias Mikkelsen (to Rosenborg BK)
34	MF	GER	Tayfun Pektürk (to İstanbul BB)

=== Eintracht Frankfurt ===
In:

No.	Pos.	Nation	Player
4	DF	GER	Marco Russ (on loan from VfL Wolfsburg)

Out:

No.	Pos.	Nation	Player
4	DF	NOR	Vadim Demidov (on loan to Celta de Vigo)
7	MF	GER	Benjamin Köhler (to 1. FC Kaiserslautern)
10	FW	AUT	Erwin Hoffer (loan return to S.S.C. Napoli)
19	FW	CMR	Dorge Kouemaha (loan return to Club Brugge)
29	FW	CAN	Rob Friend (to TSV 1860 München)

=== Fortuna Düsseldorf ===
In:

No.	Pos.	Nation	Player
2	DF	CZE	Martin Latka (from Slavia Prague)
8	MF	GER	Robert Tesche (on loan from Hamburger SV)
35	MF	NOR	Mathis Bolly (from Lillestrøm SK)
39	FW	JPN	Genki Omae (from Shimizu S-Pulse)
--	DF	ECU	Cristian Ramírez (from Independiente José Terán)

Out:

No.	Pos.	Nation	Player
8	MF	GER	André Fomitschow (on loan to Energie Cottbus)
28	FW	FIN	Timo Furuholm (on loan to Hallescher FC)

== 2. Bundesliga ==
=== Hertha BSC ===
In:

No.	Pos.	Nation	Player

Out:

No.	Pos.	Nation	Player
7	MF	AUT	Daniel Beichler (on loan to SV Sandhausen)
15	FW	GER	Elias Kachunga (loan return to Borussia Mönchengladbach)

=== 1. FC Köln ===
In:

No.	Pos.	Nation	Player
--	FW	SVN	Milivoje Novaković (loan return from Omiya Ardija)
--	FW	AUT	Stefan Maierhofer (from Red Bull Salzburg)

Out:

No.	Pos.	Nation	Player
9	FW	PRK	Jong Tae-Se (to Suwon Bluewings)
--	DF	JPN	Tomoaki Makino (to Urawa Red Diamonds, previously on loan)

=== 1. FC Kaiserslautern ===
In:

No.	Pos.	Nation	Player
20	MF	GER	Mitchell Weiser (on loan from Bayern Munich)
30	MF	AUT	Christopher Drazan (from Rapid Wien)
--	DF	GER	Chris Löwe (from Borussia Dortmund)
--	MF	GER	Benjamin Köhler (from Eintracht Frankfurt)
--	MF	GER	Markus Karl (from 1. FC Union Berlin)
--	FW	AUT	Erwin Hoffer (on loan from S.S.C. Napoli, previously on loan at Eintracht Frankfurt)

Out:

No.	Pos.	Nation	Player
3	DF	DEN	Leon Jessen (on loan to FC Ingolstadt 04)
11	FW	BUL	Iliyan Mitsanski (on loan to FC Ingolstadt 04)
25	DF	ALG	Antar Yahia (to Espérance de Tunis)
39	FW	GER	Hendrick Zuck (to SC Freiburg)

=== FC St. Pauli ===
In:

No.	Pos.	Nation	Player

Out:

No.	Pos.	Nation	Player
19	FW	TUR	Mahir Sağlık (to SC Paderborn 07)

=== SC Paderborn 07 ===
In:

No.	Pos.	Nation	Player
--	FW	GER	Elias Kachunga (on loan from Borussia Mönchengladbach, previously on loan at Hertha BSC)
--	FW	TUR	Mahir Sağlık (from FC St. Pauli)

Out:

No.	Pos.	Nation	Player
27	MF	GER	Tobias Kempe (to Dynamo Dresden)

=== TSV 1860 Munich ===
In:

No.	Pos.	Nation	Player
--	FW	NOR	Ola Kamara (from Strømsgodset IF)
--	FW	CAN	Rob Friend (from Eintracht Frankfurt)
--	DF	GER	Malik Fathi (from 1. FSV Mainz 05, previously on loan at Kayserispor)

Out:

No.	Pos.	Nation	Player
18	FW	ARG	Ismael Blanco (released)
21	MF	GER	Sandro Kaiser (to FSV Frankfurt)

=== 1. FC Union Berlin ===
In:

No.	Pos.	Nation	Player

Out:

No.	Pos.	Nation	Player
8	MF	GER	Markus Karl (to 1. FC Kaiserslautern)
18	DF	GER	Maurice Trapp (on loan to Hansa Rostock)
21	MF	TUN	Tijani Belaid (released)

=== Eintracht Braunschweig ===
In:

No.	Pos.	Nation	Player
--	MF	NOR	Omar Elabdellaoui (on loan from Manchester City F.C., previously on loan at Feyenoord)

Out:

No.	Pos.	Nation	Player
14	MF	GER	Jan Washausen (on loan to Kickers Offenbach)

=== Dynamo Dresden ===
In:

No.	Pos.	Nation	Player
18	MF	GER	Tobias Kempe (from SC Paderborn 07)
23	MF	GER	Denis Streker (on loan from 1899 Hoffenheim)
30	FW	BLR	Dmitri Khlebosolov (on loan from Spartak Moscow)

Out:

No.	Pos.	Nation	Player
14	MF	MNE	Hasan Pepic (to Juventus)
20	DF	TUR	Cüneyt Köz (on loan to Preußen Münster)
31	FW	CRO	Petar Slišković (loan return to FSV Mainz 05)
37	DF	GER	Toni Leistner (on loan to Hallescher FC)

=== MSV Duisburg ===
In:

No.	Pos.	Nation	Player
19	DF	AUT	Andreas Ibertsberger (free agent)
21	MF	GER	Sascha Dum (free agent)

Out:

No.	Pos.	Nation	Player
19	FW	NOR	Flamur Kastrati (to FC Erzgebirge Aue)
21	MF	GER	Andre Hoffmann (to Hannover 96)
33	MF	CRO	Zvonko Pamić (loan return to Bayer 04 Leverkusen)

=== VfL Bochum ===
In:

No.	Pos.	Nation	Player
30	DF	DEN	Michael Lumb (from Zenit Saint Petersburg)

Out:

No.	Pos.	Nation	Player
30	FW	GER	Daniel Engelbrecht (on loan to Stuttgarter Kickers)

=== FC Ingolstadt 04 ===
In:

No.	Pos.	Nation	Player
22	FW	BUL	Iliyan Mitsanski (on loan from 1. FC Kaiserslautern)
--	DF	DEN	Leon Jessen (on loan from 1. FC Kaiserslautern)

Out:

No.	Pos.	Nation	Player
22	FW	TUN	Ahmed Akaïchi (to Espérance de Tunis)

=== FSV Frankfurt ===
In:

No.	Pos.	Nation	Player
--	MF	GER	Sandro Kaiser (from TSV 1860 München)
--	DF	GER	Felicio Brown Forbes (from 1. FC Nürnberg II)

Out:

No.	Pos.	Nation	Player
17	FW	KOR	Yun Ju-Tae (on loan to SV Sandhausen)

=== Energie Cottbus ===
In:

No.	Pos.	Nation	Player
--	MF	GER	Christian Bickel (from SC Freiburg II)
--	MF	GER	André Fomitschow (on loan from Fortuna Düsseldorf)

Out:

No.	Pos.	Nation	Player
17	MF	GER	Daniel Ziebig (on loan to Hallescher FC)
22	FW	CZE	Martin Fenin (to Slavia Prague)
28	MF	GER	Clemens Fandrich (to RB Leipzig)

=== FC Erzgebirge Aue ===
In:

No.	Pos.	Nation	Player
9	FW	NOR	Flamur Kastrati (from MSV Duisburg)
31	MF	GER	Kevin Pezzoni (free agent)

Out:

No.	Pos.	Nation	Player

=== SV Sandhausen ===
In:

No.	Pos.	Nation	Player
--	FW	KOR	Yun Ju-Tae (on loan from FSV Frankfurt)
--	MF	AUT	Daniel Beichler (on loan from Hertha BSC)

Out:

No.	Pos.	Nation	Player
12	FW	NGA	Kingsley Onuegbu (loan return to SpVgg Greuther Fürth)

=== VfR Aalen ===
In:

No.	Pos.	Nation	Player
--	MF	JPN	Takuma Abe (from Tokyo Verdy)

Out:

No.	Pos.	Nation	Player
25	MF	GER	Kevin Ruiz (on loan to FC Memmingen)
28	MF	GER	Fabian Weiß (on loan to SG Sonnenhof Großaspach)

=== Jahn Regensburg ===
In:

No.	Pos.	Nation	Player
10	FW	ESP	Koke (from FC Baku)
30	MF	CAN	Julian de Guzman (from FC Dallas)
--	DF	BRA	Carlinhos (on loan from Bayer 04 Leverkusen)
--	GK	AUT	Bernhard Hendl (from VfB Stuttgart II)

Out:

No.	Pos.	Nation	Player

== See also ==
- 2012–13 Bundesliga
- 2012–13 2. Bundesliga
