= Sérgio Duarte =

Portuguese-American footballer

Personal information
- Full name: Sérgio Daniel Duarte
- Date of birth: January 11, 1993 (age 33)
- Place of birth: Long Branch, New Jersey, United States
- Height: 1.82 m (5 ft 11 1/2 in)
- Position: Midfielder

Team information
- Current team: Pevidém

Youth career
- 2009–2012: Nacional

Senior career*
Years	Team	Apps	(Gls)
2012–2016	Nacional	1	(0)
2013	→ Académico de Viseu (loan)	10	(0)
2013–2014	→ Mirandela (loan)	27	(2)
2014–2015	→ Lusitano FCV (loan)	29	(1)
2015–2016	→ Oriental (loan)	17	(0)
2016–2017	Salgueiros	29	(1)
2017–2018	União de Leiria	17	(0)
2018–2019	Felgueiras 1932	28	(1)
2019–2020	Merelinense	23	(2)
2020–	Pevidém	24	(1)
- * Club domestic league appearances and goals as of 5 September 2021

Sérgio Daniel Duarte (born 11 January 1993) is a Portuguese-American footballer from Long Branch, New Jersey, who plays for Pevidém as a midfielder.

He is eligible to represent Portugal or the USA internationally but has stated that he would prefer to play for the United States.
