= List of Portuguese football transfers winter 2012–13 =

This is a list of Portuguese winter football transfers for the 2012–13 season. The winter transfer window opened on 1 January 2013 and closed on 31 January 2013. Players could be bought before the transfer window opened, but were not permitted to join their new clubs until 1 January. Additionally, players without a club could join at any time and clubs were able to sign a goalkeeper on an emergency loan if they had no registered goalkeeper available. Only moves involving Primeira Liga clubs are listed; included are clubs that completed transfers after the end of the summer 2012 transfer window and before the end of the 2012–13 winter window.

== Transfers ==
Date	Name	Moving from	Moving to	Fee
3 September 2012	(Brazil) Luís Alberto	(Portugal) Braga	(Romania) Cluj	Loan
3 September 2012	(Brazil) Hulk	(Portugal) Porto	(Russia) Zenit	€40,000,000
3 September 2012	(Belgium) Axel Witsel	(Portugal) Benfica	(Russia) Zenit	€40,000,000
3 September 2012	(Brazil) Bruno Teles	(Portugal) Vitória de Guimarães	(Russia) Krylia Sovetov Samara	€300,000
5 September 2012	(France) Florent Sinama Pongolle	(Portugal) Sporting CP	(Russia) Rostov	Free
14 September 2012	(Montenegro) Žarko Tomašević	(Portugal) Nacional	(Serbia) Partizan	Free
16 October 2012	(Paraguay) Mauro Caballero	(Paraguay) Libertad	(Portugal) FC Porto	€4,000,000
11 November 2012	(Portugal) Nuno Silva	(Portugal) Olhanense	(Angola) Libolo	Free
13 November 2012	(Argentina) Andrés Madrid	(Portugal) Nacional	(Angola) Libolo	Free
16 November 2012	(Mexico) Édson Rivera	(Portugal) Braga	(Mexico) Atlas	Free
11 December 2012	(France) Frédéric Mendy	(Singapore) Home United	(Portugal) Estoril	Free
11 December 2012	(Portugal) João Vilela	(Iran) Tractor Sazi	(Portugal) Gil Vicente	Free
11 December 2012	(Angola) Valdinho	(Portugal) Desportivo das Aves	(Portugal) Gil Vicente	Free
21 December 2012	(Switzerland) Gelson Fernandes	(Portugal) Sporting CP	(Switzerland) Sion	Loan
22 December 2012	(Brazil) Marcelo Toscano	(Portugal) Vitória de Guimarães	(Brazil) Figueirense	Free
24 December 2012	(Chile) Luis Figueroa	(Portugal) Olhanense	(Chile) O'Higgins	Free
24 December 2012	(Brazil) Renato Neto	(Portugal) Sporting CP	(Belgium) Gent	Loan
26 December 2012	(Portugal) Bébé	(England) Manchester United	(Portugal) Rio Ave	Loan
27 December 2012	(Argentina) José Luis Fernández	(Portugal) Benfica	(Argentina) Godoy Cruz	Loan
28 December 2012	(Brazil) Sassá	(Portugal) Vitória de Setúbal	(Brazil) Volta Redonda	Free
28 December 2012	(Egypt) Ali Ghazal	(Egypt) Wadi Degla	(Portugal) Nacional	Undisclosed
31 December 2012	(Portugal) Daniel Carriço	(Portugal) Sporting CP	(England) Reading	€750,000
1 January 2013	(Brazil) Djalmir	Unattached	(Portugal) Olhanense	Free
1 January 2013	(Portugal) Artur	(Ukraine) Chornomorets Odesa	(Portugal) Marítimo	Loan
3 January 2013	(Portugal) Vítor Vinha	(Portugal) Olhanense	(Portugal) Gil Vicente	Free
3 January 2013	(Portugal) João Tomás	(Portugal) Rio Ave	(Angola) Libolo	Undisclosed
4 January 2013	(Portugal) Tomé	(Portugal) Nacional	(Portugal) Tondela	Free
6 January 2013	(Portugal) Miguel Lopes	(Portugal) FC Porto	(Portugal) Sporting CP	Undisclosed
7 January 2013	(Portugal) Tonel	(Croatia) Dinamo Zagreb	(Portugal) Beira-Mar	Free
7 January 2013	(Brazil) Souza	(Portugal) FC Porto	(Brazil) Grêmio	€3,000,000
7 January 2013	(Russia) Marat Izmailov	(Portugal) Sporting CP	(Portugal) FC Porto	Undisclosed
7 January 2013	(Portugal) Emídio Rafael	(Portugal) FC Porto	(Portugal) Braga	Free
8 January 2013	(Portugal) Hugo Ventura	(Portugal) FC Porto	(Portugal) Sporting CP	Undisclosed
8 January 2013	(Brazil) Paulo César	(Portugal) Braga	(Portugal) Santa Cruz	Free
9 January 2013	(Portugal) João Pedro	(Portugal) Naval	(Portugal) Braga	Undisclosed
9 January 2013	(Portugal) Luís Martins	(Portugal) Benfica	(Portugal) Gil Vicente	Undisclosed
9 January 2013	(Brazil) Rodrigo Defendi	(Portugal) Vitória de Guimarães	(Brazil) Botafogo	Free
10 January 2013	(Portugal) Sérgio Duarte	(Portugal) Nacional	(Portugal) Académico de Viseu	Loan
10 January 2013	(Brazil) Elias	(Portugal) Sporting CP	(Brazil) Flamengo	Loan
10 January 2013	(Portugal) Rui Sampaio	(Italy) Cagliari	(Portugal) Olhanense	Loan
12 January 2013	(Spain) Jona	(Spain) Granada	(Portugal) Vitória de Guimarães	Loan
13 January 2013	(Portugal) Tiago Pinto	(Portugal) Rio Ave	(Spain) Racing de Santander	Loan
14 January 2013	(Cameroon) Albert Meyong	(Portugal) Vitória Setúbal	(Angola) Kabuscorp	Undisclosed
15 January 2013	(France) Florent Hanin	(Portugal) Braga	(Portugal) Moreirense	Loan
15 January 2013	(Brazil) Ezequiel	(Brazil) Criciúma	(Portugal) Braga	Loan
16 January 2013	(Portugal) Gonçalo Reyes	(Portugal) Vitória Setúbal	(Portugal) Casa Pia	Loan
16 January 2013	(Ivory Coast) Judikael Magique	(Portugal) Académica Coimbra	(Portugal) Trofense	Loan
17 January 2013	(Portugal) Ariza Makukula	(Turkey) Karşıyaka	(Portugal) Vitória Setúbal	Free
17 January 2013	(Brazil) Luís Alberto	(Portugal) Braga	(Brazil) Vitória	Loan
13 January 2013	(Portugal) Bruno Pinheiro	(Portugal) Gil Vicente	(Israel) Maccabi Netanya	Free
25 January 2013	(Denmark) Seejou King	(Denmark) Nordsjælland	(Portugal) Sporting CP	Loan
18 January 2013	(Brazil) Isael	(Portugal) Nacional	(Russia) Kuban Krasnodar	Loan
18 January 2013	(Portugal) Paulo Jorge	(Saudi Arabia) Ittihad	(Portugal) Gil Vicente	Free
18 January 2013	(Portugal) Tiago Terroso	(Ukraine) Chornomorets Odesa	(Portugal) Olhanense	Free
18 January 2013	(Portugal) Jorge Chula	(Portugal) Sporting CP	(Portugal) Moreirense	Loan
18 January 2013	(Argentina) Gabriel Rodríguez	(Chile) Ñublense	(Portugal) Gil Vicente	Free
21 January 2013	(Portugal) Joãozinho	(Portugal) Beira-Mar	(Portugal) Sporting CP	Loan
21 January 2013	(Brazil) Bruno César	(Portugal) Benfica	(Saudi Arabia) Al-Ahli	€5,500,000
21 January 2013	(Ecuador) Vinicio Angulo	(Portugal) Paços de Ferreira	(Ecuador) Emelec	Free
22 January 2013	(Portugal) Cuco	(Cyprus) Doxa	(Portugal) Olhanense	Free
22 January 2013	(Portugal) Esmaël Gonçalves	(Portugal) Rio Ave	(Scotland) St Mirren	Loan
22 January 2013	(Portugal) Yazalde	(Portugal) Braga	(Portugal) Beira-Mar	Loan
22 January 2013	(Croatia) Danijel Pranjić	(Portugal) Sporting CP	(Spain) Celta de Vigo	Loan
22 January 2013	(South Korea) Suk Hyun-Jun	(Netherlands) Groningen	(Portugal) Marítimo	Free
22 January 2013	(Portugal) Hugo Vieira	(Portugal) Benfica	(Portugal) Gil Vicente	Loan
22 January 2013	(France) Vincent Sasso	(Portugal) Beira-Mar	(Portugal) Braga	Undisclosed
22 January 2013	(Brazil) Pio	(Portugal) Gil Vicente	(Brazil) Monte Azul	Free
22 January 2013	(Tunisia) Tijani Belaid	(Germany) Union Berlin	(Portugal) Moreirense	Free
23 January 2013	(Brazil) Júlio César	(Portugal) Moreirense	(Portugal) Feirense	Free
23 January 2013	(Brazil) Uillian Correia	(Portugal) Paços de Ferreira	(Portugal) Feirense	Loan
24 January 2013	(Portugal) Liédson	(Brazil) Flamengo	(Portugal) FC Porto	Loan
25 January 2013	(Brazil) Diogo	(Brazil) São Paulo	(Portugal) Braga	Undisclosed
25 January 2013	(Argentina) Emiliano Insúa	(Portugal) Sporting CP	(Spain) Atlético Madrid	€3,500,000
26 January 2013	(Bulgaria) Valeri Bojinov	(Portugal) Sporting CP	(Italy) Vicenza	Loan
26 January 2013	(Democratic Republic of the Congo) Christian Kinkela	(France) Sedan	(Portugal) Moreirense	Free
28 January 2013	(Portugal) Rui Fonte	(Spain) Espanyol	(Portugal) Benfica	Free
13 January 2013	(Portugal) Miguel Fidalgo	(Portugal) Vitória de Setúbal	(Portugal) União da Madeira	Free
29 January 2013	(Spain) Nolito	(Portugal) Benfica	(Spain) Granada	Loan
29 January 2013	(Russia) Stanislav Kritsyuk	(Russia) Akademiya Tolyatti	(Portugal) Braga	Undisclosed
29 January 2013	(Portugal) Tozé Marreco	(Portugal) Naval	(Portugal) Beira-Mar	Free
29 January 2013	(Spain) Daniel Abalo	(Spain) Celta de Vigo	(Portugal) Beira-Mar	Loan
29 January 2013	(Portugal) Beto	(Portugal) Braga	(Spain) Sevilla	Loan
29 January 2013	(Brazil) Bruno Nascimento	(Portugal) Estoril	(Germany) 1. FC Köln	Loan
29 January 2013	(Portugal) Yohan Tavares	(Belgium) Standard Liège	(Portugal) Estoril	Free
30 January 2013	(Portugal) Daniel Martins	(Portugal) Benfica	(Portugal) Belenenses	Free
30 January 2013	(Benin) Djiman Koukou	(Portugal) Beira-Mar	(France) Chamois Niortais	Free
30 January 2013	(Japan) Shōki Yamazaki	(Japan) Kawasaki Frontale	(Portugal) Olhanense	Free
30 January 2013	(Portugal) Bruno Pereirinha	(Portugal) Sporting CP	(Italy) Lazio	Free
30 January 2013	(Portugal) Rabiola	(Portugal) Desportivo das Aves	(Portugal) Braga	Undisclosed
30 January 2013	(Portugal) Pedro Pereira	(Portugal) Gil Vicente	(Portugal) Desportivo das Aves	Free
30 January 2013	(Ivory Coast) Bassalia Ouattara	(Portugal) Académica de Coimbra	(Portugal) Tocha	Loan
30 January 2013	(Portugal) João Patrão	(Portugal) Leixões	(Portugal) Braga	Undisclosed
30 January 2013	(Brazil) Perdigão	(Portugal) Tourizense	(Portugal) Braga	Undisclosed
30 January 2013	(Russia) Maksim Zhestkov	(Russia) Mordovia	(Portugal) Braga	Undisclosed
30 January 2013	(Portugal) Ricardo Batista	Unattached	(Portugal) Nacional	Free
31 January 2013	(Portugal) Vítor Gomes	(Portugal) Rio Ave	(Hungary) Videoton	Loan
31 January 2013	(Brazil) Thalles	(Brazil) Palmeiras	(Portugal) Olhanense	Free
31 January 2013	(Brazil) Lucas	(Brazil) Paraná	(Portugal) Olhanense	Free
31 January 2013	(Venezuela) Darwin Machís	(Spain) Granada	(Portugal) Vitória de Guimarães	Loan
31 January 2013	(Portugal) Duarte Duarte	(Portugal) Benfica	(Portugal) Paços de Ferreira	Free
31 January 2013	(Portugal) Diogo Rosado	(England) Blackburn Rovers	(Portugal) Benfica	Loan
31 January 2013	(Portugal) Tiago Cintra	(Portugal) Beira-Mar	(Portugal) Desportivo das Aves	Loan
31 January 2013	(Portugal) Rolando	(Portugal) Porto	(Italy) Napoli	Loan
31 January 2013	(Brazil) Pedro Henrique	(Portugal) Estoril	(Portugal) Sporting da Covilhã	Loan
31 January 2013	(Brazil) Zé Roberto	(Brazil) Santos	(Portugal) Benfica	Loan
31 January 2013	(Brazil) Pepe	(Brazil) Canoas	(Portugal) Olhanense	Free
31 January 2013	(Portugal) Aníbal Capela	(Portugal) Braga	(Portugal) Moreirense	Loan
31 January 2013	(Brazil) Bryan Garcia	(Brazil) América	(Portugal) Benfica	Loan
31 January 2013	(Portugal) Vitorino Antunes	(Portugal) Paços de Ferreira	(Spain) Málaga	Loan
31 January 2013	(Portugal) Luís Sousa	(Portugal) Fátima	(Portugal) Paços de Ferreira	Undisclosed
1 February 2013	(Malaysia) Nazmi Faiz	(Portugal) Beira-Mar	(Malaysia) PKNS	Loan
5 February 2013	(El Salvador) Arturo Alvarez	(Portugal) Paços de Ferreira	(Hungary) Videoton	Loan
7 February 2013	(Brazil) Kléber	(Portugal) Porto	(Brazil) Palmeiras	Loan
8 February 2013	(Slovenia) Rene Mihelič	(Portugal) Nacional	(Bulgaria) Levski Sofia	Loan
12 February 2013	(Paraguay) Derlis González	(Portugal) Benfica	(Brazil) Guaraní	Loan
12 February 2013	(Brazil) Luan	(Portugal) Gil Vicente	(Brazil) Audax São Paulo	Loan
12 February 2013	(India) Sunil Chhetri	(Portugal) Sporting CP	(India) Churchill Brothers	Loan
13 February 2013	(Brazil) Ismaily	(Portugal) Braga	(Ukraine) Shakhtar Donetsk	€4,500,000

- ^1 Some players may have been bought after the end of the 2012 summer transfer window in Portugal but before the end of that country's transfer window closed.
