= Kevin Ruiz (footballer, born 1991) =

German footballer (born 1991)

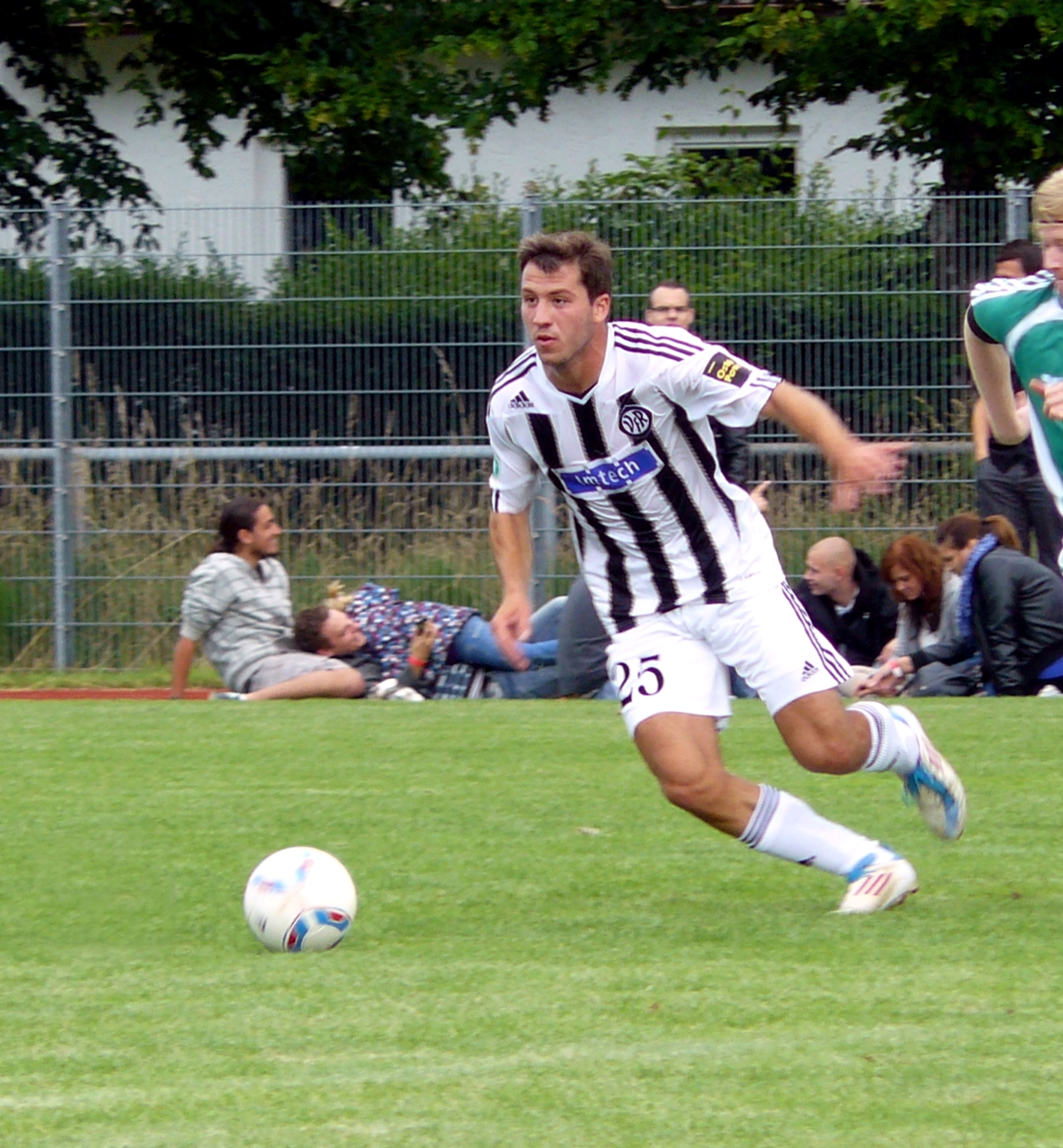
- Ruiz with VfR Aalen

Personal information
- Full name: Kevin Ruiz Castellanos
- Date of birth: 29 June 1991 (age 35)
- Place of birth: Ulm, Germany
- Height: 1.80 m (5 ft 11 in)
- Position: Midfielder

Youth career
- TSV Herrlingen
- TSV Blaustein
- SSV Ulm
- –2009: 1. FC Heidenheim
- 2009–2011: VfR Aalen

Senior career*
Years	Team	Apps	(Gls)
2011–2014	VfR Aalen	8	(0)
2013	→ FC Memmingen (loan)	16	(6)
2014	FC Nöttingen	4	(0)
2014–2015	FC Memmingen	29	(3)
2016	TSV Neu-Ulm		
- * Club domestic league appearances and goals

Kevin Ruiz Castellanos (born 29 June 1991) is a German former professional footballer who played as a midfielder. He played in the 3. Liga for VfR Aalen. He later worked as a coach.
