= List of English football transfers winter 2012–13 =

The 2012–13 winter transfer window for English football transfers opened on 1 January and closed on 31 January 2013. Additionally, players without a club could join at any time, clubs below Premier League level could sign players on loan at any time, and clubs could sign a goalkeeper on an emergency loan if they had no registered goalkeeper available. This list includes transfers featuring at least one Premier League or Championship club which were completed after the end of the summer 2012 transfer window and before the end of the 2012–13 winter window.

== Transfers ==
All players and clubs without a flag are English. Note that while Cardiff City and Swansea City are associated with the Welsh flag, they play in the Championship and the Premier League (of England) respectively, and so transfers related to them and another non-English club are included.

Date	Name	Moving from	Moving to	Fee
3 September 2012	(Portugal) Raul Meireles	Chelsea	(Turkey) Fenerbahçe	£8m
4 September 2012	Michael Owen	Unattached	Stoke City	Free
5 September 2012	(Scotland) Kirk Broadfoot	Unattached	Blackpool	Free
5 September 2012	(Chile) Ángelo Henríquez	Universidad de Chile	Manchester United	Undisclosed
5 September 2012	(Poland) Stefan Galinski	Derby County	Corby Town	Loan
5 September 2012	(Peru) Pier Larrauri	Leicester City	(Mexico) Pachuca	Loan
6 September 2012	David Bentley	Tottenham Hotspur	(Russia) FC Rostov	Loan
6 September 2012	Leroy Lita	(Wales) Swansea City	Birmingham City	Loan
7 September 2012	Chuks Aneke	Arsenal	Crewe Alexandra	Loan
8 September 2012	Craig Lynch	Sunderland	Hartlepool United	Loan
10 September 2012	(Netherlands) Dwight Tiendalli	Unattached	(Wales) Swansea City	Free
11 September 2012	(Cameroon) André Bikey	Unattached	Middlesbrough	Free
11 September 2012	(Greece) Giorgos Karagounis	Unattached	Fulham	Free
12 September 2012	Chris Atkinson	Huddersfield Town	Chesterfield	Loan
12 September 2012	Ben Wilson	Sunderland	Chesterfield	Loan
12 September 2012	David Wright	Crystal Palace	Gillingham	Loan
13 September 2012	Kwesi Appiah	Crystal Palace	Aldershot Town	Loan
13 September 2012	(Scotland) Paul Gallagher	Leicester City	Sheffield United	Loan
13 September 2012	Michael Tonge	Stoke City	Leeds United	Loan
14 September 2012	Ross Barkley	Everton	Sheffield Wednesday	Loan
14 September 2012	Matt Derbyshire	Nottingham Forest	Oldham Athletic	Loan
14 September 2012	Tom Hopper	Leicester City	Bury	Loan
14 September 2012	(France) Cheick Kourouma	(Italy) Genoa	Ipswich Town	Undisclosed
15 September 2012	Reece Wabara	Manchester City	Oldham Athletic	Loan
17 September 2012	Piero Mingoia	Watford	Accrington Stanley	Loan
17 September 2012	Matthew Whichelow	Watford	Accrington Stanley	Loan
17 September 2012	(New Zealand) Chris Wood	West Bromwich Albion	Millwall	Loan
18 September 2012	Joe Garner	Watford	Carlisle United	Loan
18 September 2012	Elliot Parish	(Wales) Cardiff City	Wycombe Wanderers	Loan
19 September 2012	(Nigeria) Godwin Abadaki	Rochdale	Huddersfield Town	Loan
19 September 2012	(Wales) Danny Gabbidon	Unattached	Crystal Palace	Free
19 September 2012	James Pearson	Unattached	Leicester City	Free
20 September 2012	Karl Darlow	Nottingham Forest	Walsall	Loan
20 September 2012	Ross Jenkins	Watford	Plymouth Argyle	Loan
21 September 2012	Joe Edwards	Bristol City	Yeovil Town	Loan
21 September 2012	(Wales) Robert Earnshaw	(Wales) Cardiff City	(Israel) Maccabi Tel Aviv	Loan
21 September 2012	(United States) Robbie Findley	Nottingham Forest	Gillingham	Loan
21 September 2012	Conor Henderson	Arsenal	Coventry City	Loan
21 September 2012	Kallum Higginbotham	Huddersfield Town	Carlisle United	Loan
21 September 2012	Tom Kennedy	Unattached	Barnsley	Free
21 September 2012	Jamie Reckord	Wolverhampton Wanderers	Coventry City	Loan
22 September 2012	(Poland) Artur Boruc	Unattached	Southampton	Free
22 September 2012	Danny Higginbotham	Stoke City	Ipswich Town	Loan
25 September 2012	Paul Robinson	Unattached	Birmingham City	Free
26 September 2012	Jordan Archer	Tottenham Hotspur	Wycombe Wanderers	Loan
26 September 2012	(Cameroon) George Elokobi	Wolverhampton Wanderers	Bristol City	Loan
27 September 2012	Craig Eastmond	Arsenal	Colchester United	Loan
27 September 2012	Tom Eaves	Bolton Wanderers	Bristol Rovers	Loan
27 September 2012	Micah Evans	Blackburn Rovers	Chesterfield	Loan
27 September 2012	(Scotland) Bob Harris	Blackpool	Rotherham United	Loan
27 September 2012	Kemar Roofe	West Bromwich Albion	Northampton Town	Loan
27 September 2012	Sanchez Watt	Arsenal	Colchester United	Loan
28 September 2012	Lee Collins	Barnsley	Shrewsbury Town	Loan
28 September 2012	Jermaine Jenas	Tottenham Hotspur	Nottingham Forest	Loan
28 September 2012	(Republic of Ireland) Rob Kiernan	Wigan Athletic	Burton Albion	Loan
28 September 2012	Sam Winnall	Wolverhampton Wanderers	Shrewsbury Town	Loan
29 September 2012	(Scotland) Scott Allan	West Bromwich Albion	Milton Keynes Dons	Loan
1 October 2012	Saido Berahino	West Bromwich Albion	Peterborough United	Loan
1 October 2012	Rob Hulse	Queens Park Rangers	Charlton Athletic	Loan
1 October 2012	James Hurst	West Bromwich Albion	Birmingham City	Loan
1 October 2012	Yado Mambo	Charlton Athletic	AFC Wimbledon	Loan
4 October 2012	(Republic of Ireland) Matt Doherty	Wolverhampton Wanderers	Bury	Loan
4 October 2012	(Republic of Ireland) Daniel Kearns	Peterborough United	York City	Loan
4 October 2012	Richie Wellens	Leicester City	Ipswich Town	Loan
5 October 2012	Mark Beevers	Sheffield Wednesday	Millwall	Loan
5 October 2012	DJ Campbell	Queens Park Rangers	Ipswich Town	Loan
5 October 2012	(France) Bilel Mohsni	Southend United	Ipswich Town	Loan
5 October 2012	Ryan Noble	Sunderland	Hartlepool United	Loan
5 October 2012	(Senegal) Mickaël Tavares	Unattached	Fulham	Free
6 October 2012	Ashley Eastham	Blackpool	Notts County	Loan
8 October 2012	Jordan Mustoe	Wigan Athletic	Morecambe	Loan
9 October 2012	(Senegal) Papa Bouba Diop	Unattached	Birmingham City	Free
9 October 2012	Scott Griffiths	Peterborough United	Plymouth Argyle	Loan
9 October 2012	Billy Knott	Sunderland	Woking	Loan
9 October 2012	Charlie Wyke	Middlesbrough	Hartlepool United	Loan
9 October 2012	(Portugal) Bruno Andrade	Queens Park Rangers	Wycombe Wanderers	Loan
10 October 2012	(Wales) Rob Edwards	Barnsley	Fleetwood Town	Loan
10 October 2012	(Wales) Emyr Huws	Manchester City	Northampton Town	Loan
11 October 2012	Jack Sampson	Bolton Wanderers	Accrington Stanley	Loan
12 October 2012	Jermaine Pennant	Stoke City	Wolverhampton Wanderers	Loan
12 October 2012	Scott Wagstaff	Charlton Athletic	Leyton Orient	Loan
13 October 2012	Nigel Reo-Coker	Unattached	Ipswich Town	Free
15 October 2012	Zac Thompson	Leeds United	Bury	Loan
15 October 2012	Dominic Poleon	Leeds United	Bury	Loan
16 October 2012	(Republic of Ireland) Stephen Henderson	West Ham United	Ipswich Town	Loan
17 October 2012	(Scotland) Stephen McManus	Middlesbrough	Bristol City	Loan
18 October 2012	Ryan Hall	Southend United	Leeds United	Loan
19 October 2012	Jack Munns	Tottenham Hotspur	Aldershot Town	Loan
19 October 2012	(Republic of Ireland) Lee Frecklington	Peterborough United	Rotherham United	Loan
19 October 2012	(Scotland) Craig Forsyth	Watford	Bradford City	Loan
19 October 2012	(Germany) Thomas Hitzlsperger	Unattached	Everton	Free
20 October 2012	Jake Jervis	Birmingham City	Tranmere Rovers	Loan
22 October 2012	Troy Hewitt	Queens Park Rangers	Bury	Loan
22 October 2012	Carl Dickinson	Watford	Portsmouth	Loan
23 October 2012	Daniel Johnson	Aston Villa	Yeovil Town	Loan
23 October 2012	Adam Davies	Unattached	Sheffield Wednesday	Free
23 October 2012	(Colombia) Angelo Balanta	Queens Park Rangers	Milton Keynes Dons	Loan
25 October 2012	Curtis Obeng	(Wales) Swansea City	Fleetwood Town	Loan
25 October 2012	Josh Morris	Blackburn Rovers	Rotherham United	Loan
25 October 2012	(France) Jérémy Hélan	Manchester City	Shrewsbury Town	Loan
25 October 2012	Nathan Eccleston	Blackpool	Tranmere Rovers	Loan
25 October 2012	Lawson D'Ath	Reading	Cheltenham Town	Loan
26 October 2012	Elliott Ward	Norwich City	Nottingham Forest	Loan
26 October 2012	(France) Romain Vincelot	Brighton & Hove Albion	Gillingham	Loan
26 October 2012	Jamie Proctor	(Wales) Swansea City	Shrewsbury Town	Loan
26 October 2012	Mark Oxley	Hull City	Burton Albion	Loan
26 October 2012	Osayamen Osawe	Blackburn Rovers	Accrington Stanley	Loan
26 October 2012	(Scotland) James McFadden	Unattached	Sunderland	Free
26 October 2012	(Turkey) Kerim Frei	Fulham	(Wales) Cardiff City	Loan
26 October 2012	Matthew Briggs	Fulham	Bristol City	Loan
29 October 2012	(Scotland) Scott Allan	West Bromwich Albion	Portsmouth	Loan
1 November 2012	(Republic of Ireland) Jamie Devitt	Hull City	Rotherham United	Loan
1 November 2012	(Scotland) Liam Cooper	Hull City	Chesterfield	Loan
1 November 2012	Adam Smith	Tottenham Hotspur	Millwall	Loan
2 November 2012	Tamika Mkandawire	Millwall	Southend United	Loan
2 November 2012	(Scotland) Barry Ferguson	Blackpool	Fleetwood Town	Loan
2 November 2012	Julian Bennett	Sheffield Wednesday	Shrewsbury Town	Loan
2 November 2012	(Scotland) Jordan Archer	Tottenham Hotspur	Wycombe Wanderers	Loan
5 November 2012	Steve Mildenhall	Millwall	Scunthorpe United	Loan
5 November 2012	(Republic of Ireland) John Egan	Sunderland	Bradford City	Loan
5 November 2012	(Finland) Lauri Dalla Valle	Fulham	Crewe Alexandra	Loan
6 November 2012	Lee Nicholls	Wigan Athletic	Northampton Town	Loan
6 November 2012	(Republic of Ireland) Sean McGinty	Manchester United	Carlisle United	Loan
6 November 2012	Michael Keane	Manchester United	Leicester City	Loan
6 November 2012	Jesse Lingard	Manchester United	Leicester City	Loan
6 November 2012	(Republic of Ireland) Robbie Brady	Manchester United	Hull City	Loan
7 November 2012	Ibra Sekajja	Crystal Palace	Milton Keynes Dons	Loan
8 November 2012	(Republic of Ireland) David Meyler	Sunderland	Hull City	Loan
8 November 2012	Brennan Dickenson	Brighton & Hove Albion	Chesterfield	Loan
8 November 2012	(Wales) Simon Church	Reading	Huddersfield Town	Loan
8 November 2012	Jacob Butterfield	Norwich City	Bolton Wanderers	Loan
9 November 2012	John Sullivan	Charlton Athletic	Colchester United	Loan
9 November 2012	Danny Seaborne	Southampton	Charlton Athletic	Loan
9 November 2012	Sam Mantom	West Bromwich Albion	Walsall	Loan
9 November 2012	(Iceland) Eggert Jónsson	Wolverhampton Wanderers	Charlton Athletic	Loan
9 November 2012	Ethan Ebanks-Landell	Wolverhampton Wanderers	Bury	Loan
10 November 2012	(Portugal) Alberto Seidi	Southampton	Aldershot Town	Loan
12 November 2012	(France) Christopher Dilo	Blackburn Rovers	Hyde	Loan
13 November 2012	Jake Caprice	Blackpool	Dagenham & Redbridge	Loan
13 November 2012	(Central African Republic) Kelly Youga	Unattached	Ipswich Town	Free
14 November 2012	Marcus Tudgay	Nottingham Forest	Barnsley	Loan
14 November 2012	Bradley Orr	Blackburn Rovers	Ipswich Town	Loan
14 November 2012	Neil Danns	Leicester City	Bristol City	Loan
15 November 2012	Nathaniel Mendez-Laing	Peterborough United	Portsmouth	Loan
15 November 2012	Chris Martin	Norwich City	Swindon Town	Loan
15 November 2012	(Republic of Ireland) Rob Kiernan	Wigan Athletic	Brentford	Loan
15 November 2012	Danny Hollands	Charlton Athletic	Swindon Town	Loan
16 November 2012	Courtney Cameron	Aston Villa	Rotherham United	Loan
16 November 2012	Nathan Ellington	Ipswich Town	Scunthorpe United	Loan
16 November 2012	(Republic of Ireland) Aaron McCarey	Wolverhampton Wanderers	Walsall	Loan
16 November 2012	Tom Naylor	Derby County	Bradford City	Loan
17 November 2012	Blair Adams	Sunderland	Coventry City	Loan
17 November 2012	Matthew Bates	Unattached	Bristol City	Free
19 November 2012	Emmanuel Frimpong	Arsenal	Charlton Athletic	Loan
19 November 2012	Tyrone Barnett	Peterborough United	Ipswich Town	Loan
20 November 2012	Jacob Blyth	Leicester City	Burton Albion	Loan
20 November 2012	Emile Sinclair	Peterborough United	Barnsley	Loan
20 November 2012	Conor Townsend	Hull City	Chesterfield	Loan
20 November 2012	(Jersey) Brett Pitman	Bristol City	Bournemouth	Loan
20 November 2012	Dwight Gayle	Dagenham & Redbridge	Peterborough United	Loan
20 November 2012	(Wales) Nathaniel Jarvis	(Wales) Cardiff City	Forest Green Rovers	Loan
21 November 2012	(Hungary) Ákos Buzsáky	Portsmouth	Barnsley	Loan
21 November 2012	Jonathan Greening	Nottingham Forest	Barnsley	Loan
21 November 2012	(Scotland) Simon Lappin	Norwich City	(Wales) Cardiff City	Loan
21 November 2012	George Thorne	West Bromwich Albion	Peterborough United	Loan
22 November 2012	Ade Azeez	Charlton Athletic	Wycombe Wanderers	Loan
22 November 2012	Patrick Bamford	Chelsea	Milton Keynes Dons	Loan
22 November 2012	George Barker	Brighton & Hove Albion	Barnet	Loan
22 November 2012	Dale Bennett	Watford	Yeovil Town	Loan
22 November 2012	(Republic of Ireland) Conor Clifford	Chelsea	Crawley Town	Loan
22 November 2012	Donervon Daniels	West Bromwich Albion	Tranmere Rovers	Loan
22 November 2012	(Denmark) Adda Djeziri	Blackpool	Scunthorpe United	Loan
22 November 2012	(Antigua and Barbuda) Cameron Gayle	West Bromwich Albion	Shrewsbury Town	Loan
22 November 2012	(Switzerland) Valentin Gjokaj	Derby County	Carlisle United	Loan
22 November 2012	(Australia) Curtis Good	Newcastle United	Bradford City	Loan
22 November 2012	Robert Hall	West Ham United	Birmingham City	Loan
22 November 2012	Michael Hector	Reading	Aldershot Town	Loan
22 November 2012	(France) Jérémy Hélan	Manchester City	Sheffield Wednesday	Loan
22 November 2012	(Northern Ireland) Lee Hodson	Watford	Brentford	Loan
22 November 2012	(Scotland) Alan Hutton	Aston Villa	Nottingham Forest	Loan
22 November 2012	(Scotland) Bradden Inman	Newcastle United	Crewe Alexandra	Loan
22 November 2012	Jake Jervis	Birmingham City	Portsmouth	Loan
22 November 2012	Zeli Ismail	Wolverhampton Wanderers	Milton Keynes Dons	Loan
22 November 2012	(Scotland) Chris Iwelumo	Watford	Notts County	Loan
22 November 2012	Todd Kane	Chelsea	Preston North End	Loan
22 November 2012	(Norway) Joshua King	Manchester United	Blackburn Rovers	Loan
22 November 2012	Angus MacDonald	Reading	Torquay United	Loan
22 November 2012	Paul McCallum	West Ham United	AFC Wimbledon	Loan
22 November 2012	Jack O'Connell	Blackburn Rovers	Rotherham United	Loan
22 November 2012	(Scotland) Michael O'Halloran	Bolton Wanderers	Tranmere Rovers	Loan
22 November 2012	Daniel Potts	West Ham United	Colchester United	Loan
22 November 2012	Liam Ridehalgh	Huddersfield Town	Rotherham United	Loan
22 November 2012	(Mali) Mamady Sidibé	Stoke City	Sheffield Wednesday	Loan
22 November 2012	Alex Smith	Fulham	Leyton Orient	Loan
22 November 2012	David Stockdale	Fulham	Hull City	Loan
22 November 2012	Alan Tate	(Wales) Swansea City	Leeds United	Loan
22 November 2012	(Wales) Jake Taylor	Reading	Cheltenham Town	Loan
22 November 2012	Jerome Thomas	West Bromwich Albion	Leeds United	Loan
22 November 2012	Wes Thomas	Bournemouth	Blackpool	Loan
22 November 2012	(Italy) Marcello Trotta	Fulham	Brentford	Loan
22 November 2012	Blair Turgott	West Ham United	Bradford City	Loan
22 November 2012	(Scotland) Danny Wilson	Liverpool	Bristol City	Loan
22 November 2012	(Scotland) Gregg Wylde	Bolton Wanderers	Bury	Loan
27 November 2012	(New Zealand) Rhys Jordan	Guernsey	Bristol City	Undisclosed
1 December 2012	Paul Rachubka	Leeds United	Accrington Stanley	Loan
4 December 2012 (Note: Player will officially join his club on 1 January 2013.)	(Brazil) Wallace	(Brazil) Fluminense	Chelsea	Undisclosed
6 December 2012	Mark Beevers	Sheffield Wednesday	Millwall	Undisclosed
13 December 2012	Tyrone Mings	Chippenham Town	Ipswich Town	Undisclosed
27 December 2012	(Portugal) Bébé	Manchester United	(Portugal) Rio Ave	Loan
31 December 2012	(Portugal) Daniel Carriço	(Portugal) Sporting CP	Reading	£609k
31 December 2012	(Italy) Carlo Cudicini	Tottenham Hotspur	(United States) LA Galaxy	Free
31 December 2012	Ryan Harley	Brighton & Hove Albion	Milton Keynes Dons	Loan
31 December 2012	Tom Hitchcock	Queens Park Rangers	Bristol Rovers	Loan
31 December 2012	Yado Mambo	Charlton Athletic	Shrewsbury Town	Loan
31 December 2012	Steve Mildenhall	Millwall	Bristol Rovers	Loan
31 December 2012	George Porter	Burnley	Colchester United	Loan
1 January 2013	Leon Clarke	Charlton Athletic	Coventry City	Loan
1 January 2013	Karl Darlow	Nottingham Forest	Walsall	Loan
1 January 2013	(Republic of Ireland) Michael Harriman	Queens Park Rangers	Wycombe Wanderers	Loan
1 January 2013	Danny Higginbotham	Stoke City	Sheffield United	Free
1 January 2013	(South Korea) Ji Dong-Won	Sunderland	(Germany) FC Augsburg	Loan
1 January 2013	David Lucas	Birmingham City	Fleetwood Town	Undisclosed
1 January 2013	Conor Newton	Newcastle United	(Scotland) St Mirren	Loan
1 January 2013	(New Zealand) Chris Wood	West Bromwich Albion	Leicester City	Undisclosed
2 January 2013	(Chile) Ángelo Henríquez	Manchester United	Wigan Athletic	Loan
2 January 2013	Daniel Sturridge	Chelsea	Liverpool	£12m
2 January 2013	(Norway) Joshua King	Manchester United	Blackburn Rovers	Undisclosed
2 January 2013	(Republic of Ireland) Lee Frecklington	Peterborough United	Rotherham United	Undisclosed
3 January 2013	Zeki Fryers	(Belgium) Standard Liège	Tottenham Hotspur	£3m
3 January 2013	Sam Hoskins	Southampton	Stevenage	Loan
3 January 2013	(Australia) Patrick Kisnorbo	Leeds United	Ipswich Town	Loan
3 January 2013	(Republic of Ireland) Sean Maguire	(Republic of Ireland) Waterford United	West Ham United	Undisclosed
3 January 2013	(Republic of Ireland) Stephen McLaughlin	(Republic of Ireland) Derry City	Nottingham Forest	Undisclosed
3 January 2013	Adam Morgan	Liverpool	Rotherham United	Loan
3 January 2013	(Jersey) Brett Pitman	Bristol City	Bournemouth	Undisclosed
3 January 2013	Dominic Samuel	Reading	Colchester United	Loan
4 January 2013	(Senegal) Demba Ba	Newcastle United	Chelsea	Undisclosed
4 January 2013	(Israel) Tal Ben Haim	Unattached	Queens Park Rangers	Free
4 January 2013	(Morocco) Marouane Chamakh	Arsenal	West Ham United	Loan
4 January 2013	Joe Cole	Liverpool	West Ham United	Free
4 January 2013	(Netherlands) Chris David	(Netherlands) Twente	Fulham	Undisclosed
4 January 2013	(France) Mathieu Debuchy	(France) Lille	Newcastle United	Undisclosed
4 January 2013	Matthew Dolan	Middlesbrough	Yeovil Town	Loan
4 January 2013	(Republic of Ireland) Jamie Devitt	Hull City	Grimsby Town	Loan
4 January 2013	(Honduras) Roger Espinoza	(United States) Sporting Kansas City	Wigan Athletic	Free
4 January 2013	(Cameroon) Steve Leo Beleck	Watford	Stevenage	Re-loan (Note: Leo Beleck is in turn at Watford on loan from Italian side Udinese.)
4 January 2013	(Scotland) Stephen McGinn	Watford	Shrewsbury Town	Loan
4 January 2013	David McGoldrick	Nottingham Forest	Ipswich Town	Loan
4 January 2013	Aaron McLean	Hull City	Ipswich Town	Loan
4 January 2013	(New Zealand) James Musa	Fulham	Hereford United	Loan
4 January 2013	(Northern Ireland) Adam Thompson	Watford	Barnet	Loan
4 January 2013	Darren Ward	Millwall	Swindon Town	Free
5 January 2013	(Scotland) Liam Cooper	Hull City	Chesterfield	Undisclosed
5 January 2013	(Switzerland) Johan Djourou	Arsenal	(Germany) Hannover 96	Loan
5 January 2013	(Latvia) Vitālijs Maksimenko	(Latvia) Skonto Riga	Brighton & Hove Albion	Undisclosed
5 January 2013	Emile Sinclair	Peterborough United	Doncaster Rovers	Loan
7 January 2013	Myles Anderson	Blackburn Rovers	Exeter City	Free
7 January 2013	Leon Clarke	Charlton Athletic	Coventry City	Free
8 January 2013	Hope Akpan	Crawley Town	Reading	Undisclosed
8 January 2013	(Republic of Ireland) Robbie Brady	Manchester United	Hull City	Undisclosed
8 January 2013	Neil Danns	Leicester City	Huddersfield Town	Loan
8 January 2013	Joe Garner	Watford	Preston North End	Free
8 January 2013	(Republic of Ireland) David Meyler	Sunderland	Hull City	Undisclosed
8 January 2013	Frank Nouble	Wolverhampton Wanderers	Ipswich Town	Undisclosed
9 January 2013	Kallum Higginbotham	Huddersfield Town	(Scotland) Motherwell	Loan
9 January 2013	(France) Alfred N'Diaye	(Turkey) Bursaspor	Sunderland	Undisclosed
9 January 2013	(Wales) Craig Davies	Barnsley	Bolton Wanderers	Undisclosed
9 January 2013	(Scotland) Andy Gray	Leeds United	Bradford City	Free
9 January 2013	Todd Kane	Chelsea	Blackburn Rovers	Loan
9 January 2013	(Republic of Ireland) Daniel Kearns	Peterborough United	Rotherham United	Loan
9 January 2013	(Italy) Davide Petrucci	Manchester United	Peterborough United	Loan
9 January 2013	Martyn Woolford	Bristol City	Millwall	Undisclosed
9 January 2013	Scott Wootton	Manchester United	Peterborough United	Loan
10 January 2013	Ethan Ebanks-Landell	Wolverhampton Wanderers	Bury	Loan
10 January 2013	(Chile) Gonzalo Jara	West Bromwich Albion	Nottingham Forest	Loan
10 January 2013	(Republic of Ireland) Ronan Murray	Ipswich Town	Plymouth Argyle	Loan
10 January 2013	Alex Nimely	Manchester City	Crystal Palace	Loan
10 January 2013	Ibra Sekajja	Crystal Palace	Barnet	Loan
10 January 2013	Matt Sparrow	Brighton & Hove Albion	Crawley Town	Free
10 January 2013	Michael Tonge	Stoke City	Leeds United	Undisclosed
10 January 2013	Elliott Ward	Norwich City	Nottingham Forest	Loan
11 January 2013	Ross Barkley	Everton	Leeds United	Loan
11 January 2013	Billy Clifford	Chelsea	Colchester United	Loan
11 January 2013	Ryan Dickson	Southampton	Bradford City	Loan
11 January 2013	(Scotland) Liam Kelly	(Scotland) Kilmarnock	Bristol City	Undisclosed
11 January 2013	(Republic of Ireland) Stephen Kelly	Fulham	Reading	Undisclosed
11 January 2013	(Republic of Ireland) Rob Kiernan	Wigan Athletic	Brentford	Loan
11 January 2013	Sam Mantom	West Bromwich Albion	Walsall	Free
11 January 2013	(Brazil) Wellington Paulista	(Brazil) Cruzeiro	West Ham United	Loan
14 January 2013	(Bulgaria) Martin Petrov	Bolton Wanderers	(Spain) Espanyol	Undisclosed
14 January 2013	Sam Walker	Chelsea	Colchester United	Loan
14 January 2013	(Senegal) Abdou Kader Mangane	(Saudi Arabia) Al-Hilal	Sunderland	Loan
14 January 2013	(Italy) Fernando Forestieri	(Italy) Udinese	Watford	Undisclosed
14 January 2013	(Belgium) Roland Lamah	(Spain) Osasuna	(Wales) Swansea City	Loan
15 January 2013	Paul Connolly	Leeds United	Preston North End	Loan
15 January 2013	(Republic of Ireland) Frankie Sutherland	Queens Park Rangers	Portsmouth	Loan
16 January 2013	Jacob Butterfield	Norwich City	Crystal Palace	Loan
16 January 2013	Jake Jervis	Birmingham City	(Turkey) Elazığspor	Undisclosed
16 January 2013	(Brazil) Lucas Piazón	Chelsea	(Spain) Málaga	Loan
16 January 2013	(France) Loïc Rémy	(France) Marseille	Queens Park Rangers	£8m
16 January 2013	Jamie Proctor	(Wales) Swansea City	Crawley Town	Undisclosed
16 January 2013	(Argentina) Leonardo Ulloa	(Spain) Almería	Brighton & Hove Albion	Undisclosed
17 January 2013	Blair Adams	Sunderland	Coventry City	Undisclosed
17 January 2013	(United States) Maurice Edu	Stoke City	(Turkey) Bursaspor	Loan
17 January 2013	Joe Edwards	Bristol City	Yeovil Town	Undisclosed
17 January 2013	(Spain) Joel Robles	(Spain) Atlético Madrid	Wigan Athletic	Loan
17 January 2013	Danny Seaborne	Southampton	Bournemouth	Loan
17 January 2013	Gozie Ugwu	Reading	Plymouth Argyle	Loan
18 January 2013	Ade Azeez	Charlton Athletic	Leyton Orient	Loan
18 January 2013	(Norway) Vegard Forren	(Norway) Molde	Southampton	Undisclosed
18 January 2013	Daniel Jones	Sheffield Wednesday	Port Vale	Free
18 January 2013	David Stockdale	Fulham	Hull City	Loan
18 January 2013	(Scotland) Danny Wilson	Liverpool	(Scotland) Hearts	Loan
20 January 2013	(France) Djibril Cissé	Queens Park Rangers	(Qatar) Al-Gharafa	Loan
21 January 2013	Fraizer Campbell	Sunderland	(Wales) Cardiff City	Undisclosed
21 January 2013	Ashley Eastham	Blackpool	Bury	Loan
22 January 2013	Chris Lines	Sheffield Wednesday	Milton Keynes Dons	Loan
22 January 2013	(France) Mapou Yanga-Mbiwa	(France) Montpellier	Newcastle United	Undisclosed
23 January 2013	Nicky Ajose	Peterborough United	Bury	Loan
23 January 2013	Ryan Brunt	Stoke City	Bristol Rovers	Undisclosed
23 January 2013	(Spain) Iago Falqué	Tottenham Hotspur	(Spain) Almería	Loan
23 January 2013	(France) Yoan Gouffran	(France) Bordeaux	Newcastle United	Undisclosed
24 January 2013	Craig Dawson	West Bromwich Albion	Bolton Wanderers	Loan
24 January 2013	(Argentina) Mauro Formica	Blackburn Rovers	(Italy) Palermo	Loan
24 January 2013	(France) Massadio Haïdara	(France) Nancy	Newcastle United	Undisclosed
24 January 2013	Darius Henderson	Millwall	Nottingham Forest	Undisclosed
24 January 2013	(Italy) Federico Macheda	Manchester United	(Germany) VfB Stuttgart	Loan
24 January 2013	Jack O'Connell	Blackburn Rovers	York City	Loan
25 January 2013	(Ivory Coast) Souleymane Coulibaly	Tottenham Hotspur	(Italy) Grosseto	Loan
25 January 2013	Matt Derbyshire	Nottingham Forest	Blackpool	Loan
25 January 2013	(Ghana) Emmanuel Frimpong	Arsenal	Fulham	Loan
25 January 2013	(Slovakia) Ján Greguš	(Czech Republic) Baník Ostrava	Bolton Wanderers	Loan
25 January 2013	(Northern Ireland) Caolan Lavery	Sheffield Wednesday	Southend United	Loan
25 January 2013	Leroy Lita	(Wales) Swansea City	Sheffield Wednesday	Loan
25 January 2013	(Northern Ireland) Luke McCullough	Manchester United	Cheltenham Town	Loan
25 January 2013	Paul McKenna	Hull City	Fleetwood Town	Loan
25 January 2013	(Republic of Ireland) Brendan Moloney	Nottingham Forest	Bristol City	Free
25 January 2013	Michael Ngoo	Liverpool	(Scotland) Hearts	Loan
25 January 2013	Danny Pugh	Leeds United	Sheffield Wednesday	Loan
25 January 2013	(Wales) Ashley Richards	(Wales) Swansea City	Crystal Palace	Loan
25 January 2013	(France) Moussa Sissoko	(France) Toulouse	Newcastle United	Undisclosed
25 January 2013	Charlie Taylor	Leeds United	(Scotland) Inverness Caledonian Thistle	Loan
25 January 2013	David Wright	Crystal Palace	Colchester United	Free
25 January 2013	Wilfried Zaha	Crystal Palace	Manchester United	£10m + £5m add-ons
25 January 2013	Wilfried Zaha	Manchester United	Crystal Palace	Loan
26 January 2013	(Argentina) Mauro Boselli	Wigan Athletic	(Italy) Palermo	Loan
26 January 2013	Jack Payne	Gillingham	Peterborough United	Loan
28 January 2013	Kwesi Appiah	Crystal Palace	Yeovil Town	Loan
28 January 2013	(Germany) Lewis Holtby	(Germany) Schalke 04	Tottenham Hotspur	£1.5m
28 January 2013	(Austria) Emanuel Pogatetz	(Germany) VfL Wolfsburg	West Ham United	Loan
28 January 2013	(Scotland) Scott Robertson	Blackpool	(Scotland) Hibernian	Free
28 January 2013	(Trinidad and Tobago) Jason Scotland	Ipswich Town	Barnsley	Free
29 January 2013	(Iceland) Emil Asmundssen	(Iceland) Fylkir	Brighton & Hove Albion	Undisclosed
29 January 2013	(Wales) Michael Doughty	Queens Park Rangers	(Scotland) St Johnstone	Loan
29 January 2013	Anton Ferdinand	Queens Park Rangers	(Turkey) Bursaspor	Loan
29 January 2013	Jordan Gibbons	Queens Park Rangers	(Scotland) Inverness Caledonian Thistle	Loan
29 January 2013	(France) Jérémy Hélan	Manchester City	Sheffield Wednesday	Loan
29 January 2013	Rob Hulse	Queens Park Rangers	Millwall	Loan
29 January 2013	(Scotland) Alan Hutton	Aston Villa	(Spain) Mallorca	Loan
29 January 2013	(Scotland) Simon Lappin	Unattached	(Wales) Cardiff City	Free
29 January 2013	Jonathan Maddison	Sunderland	Crawley Town	Loan
29 January 2013	Curtis Obeng	(Wales) Swansea City	York City	Loan
29 January 2013	Richard Peniket	Fulham	Telford United	Loan
29 January 2013	Declan Rudd	Norwich City	Preston North End	Loan
29 January 2013	Richard Stearman	Wolverhampton Wanderers	Ipswich Town	Loan
30 January 2013	(Kuwait) Khalid Al-Rashidi	(Kuwait) Al-Arabi	Nottingham Forest	Free
30 January 2013	Nick Blackman	Sheffield United	Reading	Undisclosed
30 January 2013	(Brazil) Philippe Coutinho	(Italy) Inter Milan	Liverpool	£8.5m
30 January 2013	(Belgium) Yassine El Ghanassy	West Bromwich Albion	(Netherlands) Heerenveen	Loan (Note: El Ghanassy is in turn at West Bromwich Albion on loan from Belgian side K.A.A. Gent.)
30 January 2013	Anton Forrester	Everton	Blackburn Rovers	Free
30 January 2013	Michael Hector	Reading	Cheltenham Town	Loan
30 January 2013	Reece Wabara	Manchester City	Blackpool	Loan
30 January 2013	Anthony Wordsworth	Colchester United	Ipswich Town	Undisclosed
30 January 2013	(South Korea) Yun Suk-Young	(South Korea) Jeonnam Dragons	Queens Park Rangers	Undisclosed
31 January 2013	(Algeria) Mehdi Abeid	Newcastle United	(Scotland) St Johnstone	Loan
31 January 2013	Chuks Aneke	Arsenal	Crewe Alexandra	Loan
31 January 2013	(Italy) Mario Balotelli	Manchester City	(Italy) Milan	£19m
31 January 2013	Jason Banton	Crystal Palace	Plymouth Argyle	Loan
31 January 2013	Lee Barnard	Southampton	Oldham Athletic	Loan
31 January 2013	Shaun Batt	Millwall	Leyton Orient	Loan
31 January 2013	(Argentina) Luciano Becchio	Leeds United	Norwich City	Undisclosed (Note: Luciano Becchio was swapped for Steve Morison, with Norwich paying an additional undisclosed fee to Leeds.)
31 January 2013	(Republic of Ireland) Cian Bolger	Leicester City	Bolton Wanderers	Undisclosed
31 January 2013	Jack Butland	Birmingham City	Stoke City	£3.5m
31 January 2013	Jack Butland	Stoke City	Birmingham City	Loan
31 January 2013	Simon Dawkins	Tottenham Hotspur	Aston Villa	Loan
31 January 2013	(Belgium) Steve De Ridder	Southampton	Bolton Wanderers	Loan
31 January 2013	(Republic of Ireland) Rory Delap	Stoke City	Barnsley	Loan
31 January 2013	(France) Alou Diarra	West Ham United	(France) Rennes	Loan
31 January 2013	(Scotland) Stephen Dobbie	Brighton & Hove Albion	Crystal Palace	Loan
31 January 2013	(Brazil) Doni	Liverpool	(Brazil) Botafogo-SP	Free
31 January 2013	(Ghana) Godsway Donyoh	Unattached	Manchester City	Free
31 January 2013	(Ghana) Godsway Donyoh	Manchester City	(Sweden) Djurgården	Loan
31 January 2013	Kieron Dyer	Unattached	Middlesbrough	Free
31 January 2013	(Wales) Gwion Edwards	(Wales) Swansea City	(Scotland) St Johnstone	Loan
31 January 2013	(Wales) Rob Edwards	Barnsley	Shrewsbury Town	Loan
31 January 2013	(Egypt) Ahmed Elmohamady	Sunderland	Hull City	Loan
31 January 2013	(Netherlands) Urby Emanuelson	(Italy) Milan	Fulham	Loan
31 January 2013	(Cameroon) Eyong Enoh	(Netherlands) Ajax	Fulham	Loan
31 January 2013	(Wales) Lee Evans	Newport County	Wolverhampton Wanderers	Undisclosed
31 January 2013	(Egypt) Ahmed Fathy	(Egypt) Al Ahly	Hull City	Loan
31 January 2013	(Argentina) Alejandro Faurlín	Queens Park Rangers	(Italy) Palermo	Loan
31 January 2013	(Barbados) Jonathan Forte	Southampton	Sheffield United	Loan
31 January 2013	(Egypt) Gedo	(Egypt) Al Ahly	Hull City	Loan
31 January 2013	(Brazil) Heurelho Gomes	Tottenham Hotspur	(Germany) 1899 Hoffenheim	Loan
31 January 2013	Danny Graham	(Wales) Swansea City	Sunderland	£5m
31 January 2013	(Senegal) Magaye Gueye	Everton	(France) Brest	Loan
31 January 2013	(Central African Republic) Habib Habibou	(Belgium) Zulte Waregem	Leeds United	Loan
31 January 2013	(Republic of Ireland) Stephen Henderson	West Ham United	Ipswich Town	Loan
31 January 2013	(Scotland) Chris Iwelumo	Watford	Oldham Athletic	Loan
31 January 2013	Jermaine Jenas	Tottenham Hotspur	Queens Park Rangers	Undisclosed
31 January 2013	(Sierra Leone) Mohamed Kamara	(Serbia) Partizan	Bolton Wanderers	Undisclosed
31 January 2013	(Scotland) Alex MacDonald	Burnley	Burton Albion	Loan
31 January 2013	(Bulgaria) Stanislav Manolev	(Netherlands) PSV	Fulham	Loan
31 January 2013	Ryan Mason	Tottenham Hotspur	(France) Lorient	Loan
31 January 2013	(Switzerland) Kevin Mbabu	(Switzerland) Servette	Newcastle United	Undisclosed
31 January 2013	(Spain) Nacho Monreal	(Spain) Málaga	Arsenal	Undisclosed
31 January 2013	(Wales) Steve Morison	Norwich City	Leeds United	Swap
31 January 2013	Jordan Obita	Reading	Oldham Athletic	Loan
31 January 2013	Chris O'Grady	Sheffield Wednesday	Barnsley	Loan
31 January 2013	(Spain) Daniel Pacheco	Liverpool	(Spain) Huesca	Loan
31 January 2013	Kevin Phillips	Blackpool	Crystal Palace	Loan
31 January 2013	Alex Pritchard	Tottenham Hotspur	Peterborough United	Loan
31 January 2013	Paul Rachubka	Leeds United	Accrington Stanley	Loan
31 January 2013	Ben Reeves	Southampton	Southend United	Loan
31 January 2013	Anton Robinson	Huddersfield Town	Gillingham	Loan
31 January 2013	(Spain) Rubén Rochina	Blackburn Rovers	(Spain) Real Zaragoza	Loan
31 January 2013	(Portugal) Diogo Rosado	Blackburn Rovers	(Portugal) Benfica B	Loan
31 January 2013	(France) Kevin Sainte-Luce	(Wales) Cardiff City	AFC Wimbledon	Free
31 January 2013	(Republic of the Congo) Christopher Samba	(Russia) Anzhi Makhachkala	Queens Park Rangers	£12.5m
31 January 2013	(Austria) Paul Scharner	(Germany) Hamburger SV	Wigan Athletic	Loan
31 January 2013	(United States) Brek Shea	(United States) FC Dallas	Stoke City	£2.5m
31 January 2013	Jordan Slew	Blackburn Rovers	Rotherham United	Loan
31 January 2013	John Stones	Barnsley	Everton	£3m
31 January 2013	(France) Yacouba Sylla	(France) Clermont Foot	Aston Villa	£2m
31 January 2013	Andros Townsend	Tottenham Hotspur	Queens Park Rangers	Loan
31 January 2013	Matthew Upson	Stoke City	Brighton & Hove Albion	Loan
31 January 2013	Stephen Warnock	Aston Villa	Leeds United	Free
31 January 2013	(Spain) Xisco	Newcastle United	(Spain) Córdoba	Free
