= List of Dutch football transfers winter 2012–13 =

This is a list of transfers in Dutch football for the 2012-13 Winter transfer window. Only moves featuring an Eredivisie team are listed.

The winter transfer window will open on January 1, 2013, and will close on January 31. Deals may be signed at any given moment in the season, but the actual transfer may only take place during the transfer window. Unattached players may sign at any moment.

Date	Name	Moving from	Moving to	Fee
5 November 2012^{1}	(Sweden) Karl-Johan Johnsson	(Sweden) Halmstads BK	(Netherlands) NEC Nijmegen	Free
30 November 2012^{1}	(Sweden) Rasmus Lindgren	Unattached	(Netherlands) FC Groningen	Free
22 December 2012^{1}	(Georgia (country)) Giorgi Chanturia	(Netherlands) Vitesse Arnhem	(Russia) Alania Vladikavkaz	Loan
21 December 2012^{1}	(Czech Republic) Jaroslav Navratil	(Czech Republic) Viktoria Zizkov	(Netherlands) Heracles Almelo	Loan
21 December 2012^{1}	(Belgium) Matthias Schamp	(Belgium) KSV Oudenaarde	(Netherlands) Heracles Almelo	Free
27 December 2012^{1}	(Netherlands) Tom Hiariej	(Netherlands) FC Groningen	(Netherlands) FC Emmen	Loan
27 December 2012^{1}	(Belgium) Jonas Ivens	(Netherlands) FC Groningen	(Belgium) Waasland-Beveren	Loan
31 December 2012^{1}	(Netherlands) Joshua Smits	(Netherlands) NEC Nijmegen	(Netherlands) FC Oss	Loan
2 January 2013	(Netherlands) Roly Bonevacia	(Netherlands) AFC Ajax	(Netherlands) Roda JC	Loan
4 January 2013	(Netherlands) Roy Heesen	(Netherlands) VVV-Venlo	(Netherlands) Helmond Sport	Loan
4 January 2013	(Sweden) Oscar Hiljemark	(Sweden) IF Elfsborg	(Netherlands) PSV Eindhoven	€2.2M
8 January 2013	(Belgium) Dedryck Boyata	(Netherlands) FC Twente	(England) Manchester City	Loan return
12 January 2013	(Serbia) Aleksandar Stevanovic	(Germany) Werder Bremen	(Netherlands) PEC Zwolle	Loan
13 January 2013	(Netherlands) Lorenzo Ebecilio	(Netherlands) AFC Ajax	(Ukraine) Metallurg Donetsk	€100K
13 January 2013	(Uruguay) Matías Jones	(Netherlands) FC Groningen	(Netherlands) FC Emmen	Loan
14 January 2013	(Norway) Omar Elabdellaoui	(Netherlands) Feyenoord	(England) Manchester City	Loan return
17 January 2013	(Netherlands) Santi Kolk	Unattached	(Netherlands) ADO Den Haag	Free
19 January 2013	(Netherlands) Michael Brouwer	(Netherlands) AGOVV	(Netherlands) Heracles Almelo	Non-contract
19 January 2013	(Sweden) Samuel Armenteros	(Netherlands) Heracles Almelo	(Belgium) RSC Anderlecht	€500K
22 January 2013	(South Korea) Hyun-Jun Suk	(Netherlands) FC Groningen	(Portugal) C.S. Marítimo	€50K
23 January 2013	(Serbia) Dejan Meleg	(Serbia) Vojvodina Novi Sad	(Netherlands) AFC Ajax	€650K
24 January 2013	(Cameroon) Willie Overtoom	(Netherlands) Heracles Almelo	(Netherlands) AZ Alkmaar	€300K
24 January 2013	(Germany) Dennis Lemke	(Germany) SV Babelsberg 03	(Netherlands) RKC Waalwijk	Undisclosed
25 January 2013	(Netherlands) Tim Cornelisse	(Netherlands) FC Twente	(Netherlands) Willem II Tilburg	Loan
26 January 2013	(Belgium) Jonas Heymans	(Belgium) Lierse SK	(Netherlands) AZ Alkmaar	Free
27 January 2013	(Netherlands) Erik Falkenburg	(Netherlands) AZ Alkmaar	(Netherlands) NEC Nijmegen	Loan
27 January 2013	(Netherlands) Ruud Boymans	(Netherlands) AZ Alkmaar	(Netherlands) NEC Nijmegen	Loan
27 January 2013	(Netherlands) Stef Nijland	(Netherlands) PSV Eindhoven	(Australia) Brisbane Roar	Loan
28 January 2013	(Netherlands) Giovanni Hiwat	(Netherlands) PEC Zwolle	(Netherlands) SC Cambuur	Loan
28 January 2013	(Netherlands) Frank Demouge	(England) AFC Bournemouth	(Netherlands) Roda JC	Loan
29 January 2013	(Iceland) Aron Jóhannsson	(Denmark) AGF Aarhus	(Netherlands) AZ Alkmaar	€1.6M
29 January 2013	(Netherlands) Kaj Ramsteijn	(Netherlands) Feyenoord	(Netherlands) VVV-Venlo	Loan
29 January 2013	(Netherlands) Joey van den Berg	(Netherlands) PEC Zwolle	(Netherlands) SC Heerenveen	€300K
30 January 2013	(Netherlands) Maikel van der Werff	(Netherlands) FC Volendam	(Netherlands) PEC Zwolle	Undisclosed
30 January 2013	(Netherlands) Arsenio Valpoort	(Netherlands) SC Heerenveen	(Netherlands) PEC Zwolle	Loan
30 January 2013	(North Macedonia) Samir Fazli	(Netherlands) SC Heerenveen	(Netherlands) Helmond Sport	Loan
30 January 2013	(Belgium) Yassine El Ghanassy	(Belgium) AA Gent	(Netherlands) SC Heerenveen	Loan
30 January 2013	(Netherlands) Nicky Hofs	(Netherlands) Vitesse Arnhem	(Netherlands) Willem II Tilburg	Loan
31 January 2013	(Netherlands) Jens Toornstra	(Netherlands) ADO Den Haag	(Netherlands) FC Utrecht	€950K
31 January 2013	(Netherlands) Dico Koppers	(Netherlands) AFC Ajax	(Netherlands) ADO Den Haag	Loan
31 January 2013	(Poland) Mateusz Klich	(Germany) VfL Wolfsburg	(Netherlands) PEC Zwolle	Loan
31 January 2013	(Iceland) Rúnar Már Sigurjónsson	(Iceland) Valur	(Netherlands) PEC Zwolle	Undisclosed
31 January 2013	(Netherlands) Luis Pedro	(Netherlands) Heracles Almelo	(Bulgaria) Botev Plovdiv	€75K
31 January 2013	(Netherlands) Nicky Kuiper	(Netherlands) FC Twente	(Greece) Panathinaikos F.C.	Loan
31 January 2013	(Netherlands) Daan Bovenberg	(Netherlands) FC Utrecht	(Netherlands) NEC Nijmegen	Undisclosed
31 January 2013	(Hungary) Tamás Kádár	(Netherlands) Roda JC	(Hungary) Diósgyőri VTK	Loan
31 January 2013	(Sweden) Alexander Gerndt	(Netherlands) FC Utrecht	(Switzerland) BSC Young Boys	€2M
31 January 2013	(Bulgaria) Stanislav Manolev	(Netherlands) PSV Eindhoven	(England) Fulham FC	Loan
31 January 2013	(Cameroon) Eyong Enoh	(Netherlands) AFC Ajax	(England) Fulham FC	Loan
31 January 2013	(Netherlands) Kevin Tano	(Netherlands) ADO Den Haag	(Netherlands) FC Dordrecht	Loan
31 January 2013	(Spain) Isaac Cuenca	(Spain) FC Barcelona	(Netherlands) AFC Ajax	Loan
1 February 2013	(Philippines) Paul Mulders	(Netherlands) ADO Den Haag	(Thailand) Chiangrai United	Free
9 February 2013	(Cape Verde) Garry Mendes Rodrigues	(Netherlands) ADO Den Haag	(Bulgaria) Levski Sofia	€300K
9 February 2013	(Netherlands) Quenten Martinus	(Netherlands) SC Heerenveen	(Hungary) Ferencváros Budapest	Undisclosed
25 February 2013	(Estonia) Marko Meerits	(Netherlands) Vitesse Arnhem	(Estonia) FC Flora	Loan
10 March 2013	(Netherlands) Nick Hengelman	Unattached	(Netherlands) Vitesse Arnhem	Free
21 March 2013	(Sweden) Amin Affane	(Netherlands) Roda JC	(England) FC Chelsea	Loan return

== Notes ==
1. Transfer will take place on 1 January 2013.
