= List of English football transfers winter 2019–20 =

This list includes transfers featuring at least one club from either the Premier League or the EFL Championship that were completed after the end of the summer 2019 transfer window on 8 August and before the closure of the 2020 winter transfer window on 31 January 2020. Players without a club could be signed at any time, clubs could sign players on loan dependent on their league's regulations, and clubs could sign a goalkeeper on an emergency loan if they had no registered senior goalkeeper available.

== Transfers ==
All players and clubs without a flag are English. Note that while Cardiff City and Swansea City are affiliated with the Football Association of Wales and thus take the Welsh flag, they play in the English Championship, and so their transfers are included here.

Date	Name	Moving from	Moving to	Fee
9 August 2019	Brandon Barker	Manchester City	(Scotland) Rangers	Undisclosed
9 August 2019	(France) Loïc Damour	(Wales) Cardiff City	(Scotland) Heart of Midlothian	Free (Note: Player was released by initial club prior to the end of relevant summer transfer window.)
9 August 2019	(Turkey) Halil Dervişoğlu	(Netherlands) Sparta Rotterdam	Brentford	Undisclosed (Note: Deal to go through in January transfer window.)
9 August 2019	(Scotland) Kyle McAllister	Derby County	(Scotland) St Mirren	Undisclosed
10 August 2019	Dan Agyei	Burnley	Oxford United	Undisclosed
10 August 2019	(Denmark) Mathias Jørgensen	Huddersfield Town	(Turkey) Fenerbahçe	Undisclosed
10 August 2019	(Wales) Aaron Lewis	(Wales) Swansea City	Lincoln City	Free
12 August 2019	Fraizer Campbell	Hull City	Huddersfield Town	Free
14 August 2019	(Nigeria) Kenneth Omeruo	Chelsea	(Spain) Leganés	£3.8m
14 August 2019	(Republic of Ireland) Glenn Whelan	Aston Villa	(Scotland) Heart of Midlothian	Free
16 August 2019	(Germany) Sean Goss	Queens Park Rangers	Shrewsbury Town	Undisclosed
16 August 2019	Erhun Oztumer	Bolton Wanderers	Charlton Athletic	Free
19 August 2019	(Israel) Tomer Hemed	Brighton & Hove Albion	Charlton Athletic	Free
21 August 2019	(Portugal) Rui Fonte	Fulham	(Portugal) Braga	Undisclosed
21 August 2019	Daniel Sturridge	Liverpool	(Turkey) Trabzonspor	Free
22 August 2019	(Greece) Nikos Karelis	(Belgium) Genk	Brentford	Free
26 August 2019	(Wales) Joel Lynch	Queens Park Rangers	Sunderland	Free
27 August 2019	(Scotland) Calum Macdonald	Derby County	Blackpool	Free
29 August 2019	(Oman) Ali Al-Habsi	(Saudi Arabia) Al-Hilal	West Bromwich Albion	Free
29 August 2019	(Republic of Ireland) Samir Carruthers	Sheffield United	Cambridge United	Free
29 August 2019	(Nigeria) Chiedozie Ogbene	Brentford	Rotherham United	Undisclosed
29 August 2019	(Democratic Republic of the Congo) Aaron Tshibola	Aston Villa	(Belgium) Waasland-Beveren	Undisclosed
30 August 2019	(Belgium) Kevin Mirallas	Everton	(Belgium) Antwerp	Free
31 August 2019	(Spain) Nacho Monreal	Arsenal	(Spain) Real Sociedad	Undisclosed
31 August 2019	(Netherlands) Rajiv van La Parra	Huddersfield Town	(Serbia) Red Star Belgrade	Undisclosed
1 September 2019	(United States) Gboly Ariyibi	Nottingham Forest	(Greece) Panetolikos	Undisclosed
2 September 2019	Arvin Appiah	Nottingham Forest	(Spain) Almería	£8m
2 September 2019	(Togo) Floyd Ayité	Fulham	(Turkey) Gençlerbirliği	Undisclosed
2 September 2019	(Scotland) Jason Cummings	Nottingham Forest	Shrewsbury Town	Undisclosed
2 September 2019	(Montserrat) Donervon Daniels	Blackpool	Luton Town	Free
2 September 2019	(Italy) Matteo Darmian	Manchester United	(Italy) Parma	Undisclosed
2 September 2019	(Belgium) Steven Defour	Burnley	(Belgium) Antwerp	Free
2 September 2019	Bobby Duncan	Liverpool	(Italy) Fiorentina	£1.8m
2 September 2019	Marcus Edwards	Tottenham Hotspur	(Portugal) Vitória de Guimarães	Undisclosed
2 September 2019	(Netherlands) Jeremie Frimpong	Manchester City	(Scotland) Celtic	Undisclosed
2 September 2019	(Switzerland) Lorenzo González	Manchester City	(Spain) Málaga	Undisclosed
2 September 2019	(Mexico) Javier Hernández	West Ham United	(Spain) Sevilla	Undisclosed
2 September 2019	Ryan Kent	Liverpool	(Scotland) Rangers	£7m
2 September 2019	(Spain) Fernando Llorente	Tottenham Hotspur	(Italy) Napoli	Free
2 September 2019	(Republic of Ireland) Daryl Murphy	Nottingham Forest	Bolton Wanderers	Free
2 September 2019	(Nigeria) Kelechi Nwakali	Arsenal	(Spain) Huesca	Undisclosed
2 September 2019	(Republic of Ireland) Lee O'Connor	Manchester United	(Scotland) Celtic	Undisclosed
2 September 2019	(Italy) Stefano Okaka	Watford	(Italy) Udinese	Undisclosed
2 September 2019	(China) Bernard Sun	(Spain) Estudiantes de Murcia	Birmingham City	Free
4 September 2019	Ben Pringle	Preston North End	Gillingham	Free
5 September 2019	(Guyana) Callum Harriott	Reading	Colchester United	Free
5 September 2019	(Jamaica) Michael Hector	Chelsea	Fulham	Undisclosed
5 September 2019	(Wales) Adam Matthews	Sunderland	Charlton Athletic	Free
14 September 2019	(Hungary) Norbert Balogh	(Italy) Palermo	Hull City	Free
19 September 2019	(Germany) Lewis Holtby	(Germany) Hamburger SV	Blackburn Rovers	Free
21 September 2019	Saul Shotton	Bury	West Bromwich Albion	Free
25 September 2019	(Northern Ireland) Jamie Ward	Nottingham Forest	Scunthorpe United	Free
27 September 2019	Josh McEachran	Brentford	Birmingham City	Free
27 September 2019	Danny Simpson	Leicester City	Huddersfield Town	Free
10 October 2019	(Republic of Ireland) Paul McShane	Reading	Rochdale	Free
16 October 2019	(Spain) Rodri	(Spain) Granada	Bristol City	Free
4 November 2019	Gareth Barry	West Bromwich Albion	West Bromwich Albion	Free (Note: Gareth Barry was released at the end of the 2018–19 season, but re-signed for West Bromwich Albion following the resolution of a clause from his prior transfer to the club from Everton)
6 November 2019	(Angola) Jérémie Bela	(Spain) Albacete	Birmingham City	Free
8 November 2019	(Senegal) Armand Traoré	(Turkey) Çaykur Rizespor	(Wales) Cardiff City	Free
29 November 2019	David Jones	Sheffield Wednesday	Oldham Athletic	Free
6 December 2019	(Scotland) Jordan Archer	Millwall	Oxford United	Free
6 December 2019	(Wales) Joe Ledley	Derby County	Charlton Athletic	Free
9 December 2019	(United States) Emerson Hyndman	Bournemouth	(United States) Atlanta United	Undisclosed
19 December 2019	(Japan) Takumi Minamino	(Austria) Red Bull Salzburg	Liverpool	£7.25m
1 January 2020	Wayne Rooney	(United States) D.C. United	Derby County	Undisclosed
1 January 2020	Jordan Thorniley	Sheffield Wednesday	Blackpool	Undisclosed
17 January 2020	Ashley Young	Manchester United	(Italy) Inter Milan	Undisclosed (Note: Fee reported as £1.28 million)
20 January 2020	(Tanzania) Mbwana Samatta	(Belgium) Genk	Aston Villa	Undisclosed
30 January 2020	(Netherlands) Steven Bergwijn	(Netherlands) PSV Eindhoven	Tottenham Hotspur	£26.7m
30 January 2020	(Portugal) Bruno Fernandes	(Portugal) Sporting Lisbon	Manchester United	Undisclosed (Note: Fee reported as £47 million, rising to £67.7 million)

== Loans ==
Start date	End date	Name	Moving from	Moving to
9 August 2019	30 June 2020	Courtney Baker-Richardson	(Wales) Swansea City	Accrington Stanley
9 August 2019	30 June 2020	(Austria) Kevin Danso	(Germany) FC Augsburg	Southampton
9 August 2019	30 June 2020	(France) Virgil Gomis	Nottingham Forest	Macclesfield Town
9 August 2019	30 June 2020	Connor Kirby	Sheffield Wednesday	Macclesfield Town
9 August 2019	30 June 2020	(Ecuador) Jefferson Montero	(Wales) Swansea City	Birmingham City
9 August 2019	30 June 2020	(Scotland) Charlie Mulgrew	Blackburn Rovers	Wigan Athletic
9 August 2019	30 June 2020	(Republic of Ireland) Corey O'Keeffe	Birmingham City	Macclesfield Town
9 August 2019	1 January 2020	Kane Wilson	West Bromwich Albion	Tranmere Rovers
10 August 2019	30 June 2020	Sam Sherring	Bournemouth	Weymouth
12 August 2019	30 June 2020	George Tanner	Manchester United	Morecambe
13 August 2019	30 June 2020	(The Gambia) Modou Barrow	Reading	(Turkey) Denizlispor
13 August 2019	30 June 2020	(Portugal) Joel Pereira	Manchester United	(Scotland) Heart of Midlothian
15 August 2019	30 June 2020	(Wales) Andy King	Leicester City	(Scotland) Rangers
16 August 2019	30 June 2020	(Scotland) Ethan Hamilton	Manchester United	Southend United
16 August 2019	30 June 2020	(Romania) Adrian Popa	Reading	(Romania) FCSB
16 August 2019	30 June 2020	Jayden Richardson	Nottingham Forest	Exeter City
16 August 2019	30 June 2020	(Denmark) Elias Sørensen	Newcastle United	Carlisle United
16 August 2019	30 June 2020	Kazaiah Sterling	Tottenham Hotspur	Doncaster Rovers
16 August 2019	30 June 2020	(Wales) Louis Thompson	Norwich City	Shrewsbury Town
16 August 2019	30 June 2020	Kelland Watts	Newcastle United	Stevenage
19 August 2019	1 January 2020	(Cyprus) Anthony Georgiou	Tottenham Hotspur	Ipswich Town
19 August 2019	1 January 2020	George Marsh	Tottenham Hotspur	Leyton Orient
19 August 2019	30 June 2020	Matty Taylor	Bristol City	Oxford United
19 August 2019	1 January 2020	George Thorne	Derby County	Oxford United
20 August 2019	30 June 2020	(Finland) Niko Hämäläinen	Queens Park Rangers	(Scotland) Kilmarnock
20 August 2019	1 January 2020	Jack Stobbs	Sheffield Wednesday	(Scotland) Livingston
21 August 2019	30 June 2020	(Sweden) Paweł Cibicki	Leeds United	(Netherlands) ADO Den Haag
21 August 2019	30 June 2020	(Algeria) Islam Slimani	Leicester City	(France) Monaco
21 August 2019	1 January 2020	(Italy) Davide Zappacosta	Chelsea	(Italy) Roma
22 August 2019	30 June 2020	Fraser Forster	Southampton	(Scotland) Celtic
22 August 2019	30 June 2020	Charlie Lakin	Birmingham City	Stevenage
22 August 2019	30 June 2020	George Miller	Barnsley	Scunthorpe United
22 August 2019	30 June 2020	Callum O'Hare	Aston Villa	Coventry City
22 August 2019	30 June 2020	Matt Penney	Sheffield Wednesday	(Germany) St. Pauli
22 August 2019	30 June 2020	(Sweden) Ken Sema	Watford	(Italy) Udinese
23 August 2019	30 June 2020	(Denmark) Anders Dreyer	Brighton & Hove Albion	(Netherlands) Heerenveen
23 August 2019	1 January 2020	Andy Fisher	Blackburn Rovers	Northampton Town
27 August 2019	30 June 2020	(Wales) Cian Harries	(Wales) Swansea City	(Netherlands) Fortuna Sittard
28 August 2019	30 June 2020	(Austria) Moritz Bauer	Stoke City	(Scotland) Celtic
28 August 2019	1 January 2020	Freddie Hinds	Bristol City	Colchester United
29 August 2019	1 January 2020	Oladapo Afolayan	West Ham United	Mansfield Town
29 August 2019	30 June 2020	Callum Connolly	Everton	Lincoln City
29 August 2019	30 June 2020	(Netherlands) Jürgen Locadia	Brighton & Hove Albion	(Germany) 1899 Hoffenheim
29 August 2019	1 January 2020	(Republic of Ireland) Thomas O'Connor	Southampton	Gillingham
29 August 2019	30 June 2020	(Chile) Alexis Sánchez	Manchester United	(Italy) Inter Milan
30 August 2019	30 June 2020	(Scotland) Oliver Burke	West Bromwich Albion	(Spain) Alavés
30 August 2019	30 June 2020	(Norway) Mohamed Elyounoussi	Southampton	(Scotland) Celtic
30 August 2019	30 June 2020	(Japan) Ryotaro Meshino	Manchester City	(Scotland) Heart of Midlothian
30 August 2019	1 January 2020	Jake Taylor	Nottingham Forest	Port Vale
30 August 2019	30 June 2020	Kyle Taylor	Bournemouth	Forest Green Rovers
30 August 2019	2 January 2020	Tennai Watson	Reading	Coventry City
31 August 2019	30 June 2020	(France) Tiémoué Bakayoko	Chelsea	(France) Monaco
31 August 2019	30 June 2020	(Egypt) Mohamed Elneny	Arsenal	(Turkey) Beşiktaş
31 August 2019	30 June 2020	(Democratic Republic of the Congo) Giannelli Imbula	Stoke City	(Italy) Lecce
31 August 2019	30 June 2020	(Austria) Kevin Wimmer	Stoke City	(Belgium) Royal Excel Mouscron
1 September 2019	30 June 2020	(Netherlands) Soufyan Ahannach	Brighton & Hove Albion	(Belgium) Union SG
1 September 2019	30 June 2020	(Argentina) Guido Carrillo	Southampton	(Spain) Leganés
1 September 2019	30 June 2020	(Serbia) Danilo Pantić	Chelsea	(Hungary) Fehérvár
2 September 2019	13 January 2020	Rolando Aarons	Newcastle United	Wycombe Wanderers
2 September 2019	1 January 2020	Aji Alese	West Ham United	Accrington Stanley
2 September 2019	30 June 2020	(Romania) Florin Andone	Brighton & Hove Albion	(Turkey) Galatasaray
2 September 2019	30 June 2020	Ellery Balcombe	Brentford	(Denmark) Viborg FF
2 September 2019	1 January 2020	(Bosnia and Herzegovina) Asmir Begović	Bournemouth	(Azerbaijan) Qarabağ
2 September 2019	30 June 2020	(Germany) Steven Benda	(Wales) Swansea City	Swindon Town
2 September 2019	30 June 2020	(Democratic Republic of the Congo) Yannick Bolasie	Everton	(Portugal) Sporting CP
2 September 2019	30 June 2020	Cameron Borthwick-Jackson	Manchester United	Tranmere Rovers
2 September 2019	1 January 2020	(Scotland) Liam Bridcutt	Nottingham Forest	Bolton Wanderers
2 September 2019	1 January 2020	Tyler Cordner	Bournemouth	Ebbsfleet United
2 September 2019	30 June 2020	George Cox	Brighton & Hove Albion	(Netherlands) Fortuna Sittard
2 September 2019	1 January 2020	(Montserrat) Donervon Daniels	Luton Town	Doncaster Rovers
2 September 2019	30 June 2020	(Belgium) Laurens De Bock	Leeds United	Sunderland
2 September 2019	30 June 2020	(Mali) Nouha Dicko	Hull City	(Netherlands) Vitesse
2 September 2019	30 June 2020	(Republic of Ireland) Jimmy Dunne	Burnley	Fleetwood Town
2 September 2019	30 June 2020	(Spain) Fabri	Fulham	(Spain) Mallorca
2 September 2019	30 June 2020	(Finland) Marcus Forss	Brentford	AFC Wimbledon
2 September 2019	30 June 2020	(Spain) Aleix García	Manchester City	(Belgium) Royal Excel Mouscron
2 September 2019	30 June 2020	(Algeria) Rachid Ghezzal	Leicester City	(Italy) Fiorentina
2 September 2019	30 June 2020	(France) Claudio Gomes	Manchester City	(Netherlands) PSV Eindhoven
2 September 2019	30 June 2020	Jake Hesketh	Southampton	Lincoln City
2 September 2019	30 June 2020	(Netherlands) Wesley Hoedt	Southampton	(Belgium) Antwerp
2 September 2019	30 June 2020	Tom Holmes	Reading	(Belgium) KSV Roeselare
2 September 2019	30 June 2020	Sam Hughes	Leicester City	Salford City
2 September 2019	30 June 2020	Jake Jervis	Luton Town	Salford City
2 September 2019	30 June 2020	Connor Johnson	Wolverhampton Wanderers	(Scotland) Kilmarnock
2 September 2019	30 June 2020	(Brazil) Kenedy	Chelsea	(Spain) Getafe
2 September 2019	30 June 2020	Callum Lang	Wigan Athletic	Shrewsbury Town
2 September 2019	30 June 2020	Joel Latibeaudiere	Manchester City	(Netherlands) Twente
2 September 2019	30 June 2020	(Morocco) Achraf Lazaar	Newcastle United	(Italy) Cosenza
2 September 2019	30 June 2020	(Gabon) Mario Lemina	Southampton	(Turkey) Galatasaray
2 September 2019	31 December 2019	(Denmark) Emiliano Marcondes	Brentford	(Denmark) Midtjylland
2 September 2019	6 January 2020	Max Melbourne	West Bromwich Albion	Lincoln City
2 September 2019	30 June 2020	(Armenia) Henrikh Mkhitaryan	Arsenal	(Italy) Roma
2 September 2019	30 June 2020	(Nigeria) Nnamdi Ofoborh	Bournemouth	Wycombe Wanderers
2 September 2019	1 January 2020	Jerome Opoku	Fulham	Accrington Stanley
2 September 2019	30 June 2020	Aramide Oteh	Queens Park Rangers	Bradford City
2 September 2019	30 June 2020	(Venezuela) Adalberto Peñaranda	Watford	(Belgium) Eupen
2 September 2019	30 June 2020	(Brazil) Lucas Piazon	Chelsea	(Portugal) Rio Ave
2 September 2019	30 June 2020	(Ghana) Baba Rahman	Chelsea	(Spain) Mallorca
2 September 2019	30 June 2020	Max Sanders	Brighton & Hove Albion	AFC Wimbledon
2 September 2019	1 January 2020	Brendan Sarpong-Wiredu	Charlton Athletic	Colchester United
2 September 2019	1 January 2020	Charlie Seaman	Bournemouth	Eastleigh
2 September 2019	30 June 2020	(Republic of Ireland) Conor Shaughnessy	Leeds United	Mansfield Town
2 September 2019	30 June 2020	Connor Simpson	Preston North End	Accrington Stanley
2 September 2019	30 June 2020	Jonny Smith	Bristol City	Oldham Athletic
2 September 2019	30 June 2020	James Tilley	Brighton & Hove Albion	Yeovil Town
2 September 2019	1 January 2020	(Belgium) Thibaud Verlinden	Stoke City	Bolton Wanderers
2 September 2019	30 June 2020	Liam Walsh	Bristol City	Coventry City
2 September 2019	30 June 2020	Jake Wright	Sheffield United	Bolton Wanderers
3 September 2019	30 June 2020	Jamal Blackman	Chelsea	(Netherlands) Vitesse
3 September 2019	30 June 2020	Shaun Hobson	Bournemouth	Weymouth
6 September 2019	1 January 2020	Sadou Diallo	Wolverhampton Wanderers	Accrington Stanley
26 October 2019	1 November 2020	Sam French	Derby County	Stevenage
1 January 2020	30 June 2020	(Scotland) Elliot Watt	Wolverhampton Wanderers	Carlisle United
6 January 2020	30 June 2020	Callum Connolly	Everton	Fleetwood Town
6 January 2020	30 June 2020	(Scotland) Ethan Hamilton	Manchester United	Bolton Wanderers
