= List of English football transfers summer 2019 =

The 2019 English football summer transfer window ran from 16 May to 8 August 2019. Players without a club could be signed at any time, clubs could sign players on loan dependent on their league's regulations, and clubs could sign a goalkeeper on an emergency loan if they had no registered senior goalkeeper available. This list includes transfers featuring at least one club from either the Premier League or the EFL Championship that were completed after the end of the winter 2018–19 transfer window on 31 January and before the end of the 2019 summer window.

== Transfers ==
All players and clubs without a flag are English. Note that while Cardiff City and Swansea City are affiliated with the Football Association of Wales and thus take the Welsh flag, they play in the Championship, and so their transfers are included here.

Date	Name	Moving from	Moving to	Fee
1 February 2019	(Belgium) Marouane Fellaini	Manchester United	(China) Shandong Luneng Taishan	Undisclosed
1 February 2019	(Northern Ireland) Will Grigg	Wigan Athletic	Sunderland	£4m
1 February 2019	(Serbia) Lazar Marković	Liverpool	Fulham	Free
1 February 2019	Ibrahim Meite	(Wales) Cardiff City	Crawley Town	Free (Note: Player was released by initial club prior to the end of England's January transfer window.)
1 February 2019	(Sweden) Alexander Milošević	(Sweden) AIK	Nottingham Forest	Free
1 February 2019	(Sweden) Jonas Olsson	(Sweden) Djurgårdens IF	Wigan Athletic	Free
1 February 2019	Nico Yennaris	Brentford	(China) Beijing Sinobo Guoan	Undisclosed
4 February 2019	(Curaçao) Liandro Martis	Leicester City	Macclesfield Town	Free
9 February 2019	(Wales) Aaron Collins	Wolverhampton Wanderers	Morecambe	Free
15 February 2019	(Nigeria) Efe Ambrose	(Scotland) Hibernian	Derby County	Free
20 February 2019	Tyias Browning	Everton	(China) Guangzhou Evergrande	Undisclosed
7 March 2019	(New Zealand) Stefan Marinovic	(Canada) Vancouver Whitecaps	Bristol City	Free
4 April 2019	(Mexico) Raúl Jiménez	(Portugal) Benfica	Wolverhampton Wanderers	£30m
5 May 2019	(Belgium) Kylian Hazard	Chelsea	(Belgium) Cercle Brugge	Undisclosed
21 May 2019	(Germany) Mike-Steven Bähre	(Germany) Hannover 96	Barnsley	Undisclosed
24 May 2019	(Czech Republic) Tomáš Holý	Gillingham	Ipswich Town	Free
24 May 2019	(Germany) Chris Löwe	Huddersfield Town	(Germany) Dynamo Dresden	Undisclosed
29 May 2019	Ethan Ebanks-Landell	Wolverhampton Wanderers	Shrewsbury Town	Undisclosed
31 May 2019	Adam Crookes	Nottingham Forest	Port Vale	Free
31 May 2019	(Republic of Ireland) Richie Towell	Brighton & Hove Albion	Salford City	Free
1 June 2019	(Sudan) Mohamed Eisa	Bristol City	Peterborough United	Undisclosed
3 June 2019	(Switzerland) Edimilson Fernandes	West Ham United	(Germany) Mainz 05	Undisclosed
3 June 2019	(Wales) Shaun MacDonald	Wigan Athletic	Rotherham United	Free
3 June 2019	David Martin	Millwall	West Ham United	Free
3 June 2019	(Spain) Lucas Pérez	West Ham United	(Spain) Alavés	Undisclosed
3 June 2019	Tyler Reid	(Wales) Swansea City	Swindon Town	Free
4 June 2019	(Republic of Ireland) Jack Bonham	Brentford	Gillingham	Free
4 June 2019	(Wales) Ryan Hedges	Barnsley	(Scotland) Aberdeen	Free
4 June 2019	(Republic of Ireland) Joe Mason	Wolverhampton Wanderers	Milton Keynes Dons	Free
4 June 2019	Callum McManaman	Wigan Athletic	Luton Town	Free
5 June 2019	Fankaty Dabo	Chelsea	Coventry City	Free
5 June 2019	Gary Gardner	Aston Villa	Birmingham City	Undisclosed
5 June 2019	(Spain) Jota	Birmingham City	Aston Villa	Undisclosed
5 June 2019	(Republic of Ireland) Alan McCormack	Luton Town	Northampton Town	Free
6 June 2019	(New Zealand) Stefan Marinovic	Bristol City	(New Zealand) Wellington Phoenix	Free (Note: Player was released by initial club prior to the beginning of England's July transfer window.)
7 June 2019	(Belgium) Eden Hazard	Chelsea	(Spain) Real Madrid	£89m
7 June 2019	Tom King	Millwall	(Wales) Newport County	Free
10 June 2019	(Netherlands) Anwar El Ghazi	(France) Lille	Aston Villa	Undisclosed
11 June 2019	(Nigeria) Ola Aina	Chelsea	(Italy) Torino	Undisclosed
11 June 2019	Kyle Howkins	West Bromwich Albion	(Wales) Newport County	Free
11 June 2019	Harry McKirdy	Aston Villa	Carlisle United	Free
11 June 2019	Stuart O'Keefe	(Wales) Cardiff City	Gillingham	Free
12 June 2019	(Wales) Daniel James	(Wales) Swansea City	Manchester United	£15m
13 June 2019	(Mali) Moussa Djenepo	(Belgium) Standard Liège	Southampton	Undisclosed
13 June 2019	Luke Thomas	Derby County	Barnsley	Free
13 June 2019	(Scotland) Greg Stewart	Birmingham City	(Scotland) Rangers	Free
13 June 2019	(Brazil) Wesley	(Belgium) Club Brugge	Aston Villa	Undisclosed
13 June 2019	Matty Willock	Manchester United	Gillingham	Free
14 June 2019	(Spain) Pablo Fornals	(Spain) Villarreal	West Ham United	£24m
14 June 2019	(Scotland) Liam Kelly	(Scotland) Livingston	Queens Park Rangers	Undisclosed
14 June 2019	(Wales) Regan Poole	Manchester United	Milton Keynes Dons	Free
14 June 2019	(Serbia) Lazar Stojsavljević	Millwall	(Wales) Newport County	Free
14 June 2019	(Scotland) Lee Wallace	(Scotland) Rangers	Queens Park Rangers	Free
15 June 2019	Tommy Elphick	Aston Villa	Huddersfield Town	Free
17 June 2019	(Zimbabwe) Macauley Bonne	Leyton Orient	Charlton Athletic	Undisclosed
17 June 2019	Zeki Fryers	Barnsley	Swindon Town	Free
17 June 2019	Kortney Hause	Wolverhampton Wanderers	Aston Villa	£3m
17 June 2019	(Estonia) Mattias Käit	Fulham	(Slovenia) Domžale	Undisclosed
17 June 2019	Josh Pask	West Ham United	Coventry City	Free
18 June 2019	Daniel Adshead	Rochdale	Norwich City	Undisclosed
18 June 2019	(France) Yoann Barbet	Brentford	Queens Park Rangers	Free
18 June 2019	(Republic of Ireland) Paudie O'Connor	Leeds United	Bradford City	Undisclosed
18 June 2019	(Algeria) Hillal Soudani	Nottingham Forest	(Greece) Olympiacos	Undisclosed
19 June 2019	(Germany) Patrick Bauer	Charlton Athletic	Preston North End	Free
19 June 2019	(Scotland) Craig Bryson	Derby County	(Scotland) Aberdeen	Free
19 June 2019	Bradley Collins	Chelsea	Barnsley	Free
19 June 2019	(Croatia) Nikola Vlašić	Everton	(Russia) CSKA Moscow	Undisclosed
20 June 2019	Reece Brown	Forest Green Rovers	Huddersfield Town	Undisclosed
21 June 2019	Matthew Clarke	Portsmouth	Brighton & Hove Albion	Undisclosed
21 June 2019	Paul Downing	Blackburn Rovers	Portsmouth	Free
21 June 2019	Stewart Downing	Middlesbrough	Blackburn Rovers	Free
21 June 2019	(Denmark) Mads Juel Andersen	(Denmark) Horsens	Barnsley	Undisclosed
21 June 2019	Josh Koroma	Leyton Orient	Huddersfield Town	Undisclosed
21 June 2019	(Democratic Republic of the Congo) Beryly Lubala	Birmingham City	Crawley Town	Free
21 June 2019	Lewis Ward	Reading	Exeter City	Undisclosed
24 June 2019	Sammy Ameobi	Bolton Wanderers	Nottingham Forest	Free
24 June 2019	(Switzerland) Josip Drmić	(Germany) Borussia Mönchengladbach	Norwich City	Free
24 June 2019	Aiden Stone	Burnley	Mansfield Town	Free
24 June 2019	(Greece) Apostolos Vellios	Nottingham Forest	(Greece) Atromitos	Undisclosed
25 June 2019	Elijah Adebayo	Fulham	Walsall	Free
25 June 2019	Jordan Cousins	Queens Park Rangers	Stoke City	Free
25 June 2019	(Wales) Adam Davies	Barnsley	Stoke City	Free
25 June 2019	(Portugal) André Gomes	(Spain) Barcelona	Everton	£22m
25 June 2019	Lee Gregory	Millwall	Stoke City	Free
25 June 2019	Matt Ingram	Queens Park Rangers	Hull City	Undisclosed
25 June 2019	(Scotland) Liam Lindsay	Barnsley	Stoke City	£2m
25 June 2019	Nick Powell	Wigan Athletic	Stoke City	Free
25 June 2019	(Iceland) Jón Dagur Þorsteinsson	Fulham	(Denmark) AGF	Undisclosed
25 June 2019	James Vaughan	Wigan Athletic	Bradford City	Free
26 June 2019	Corey Blackett-Taylor	Aston Villa	Tranmere Rovers	Free
26 June 2019	Jay Dasilva	Chelsea	Bristol City	Undisclosed
26 June 2019	Sid Nelson	Millwall	Tranmere Rovers	Free
26 June 2019	(Austria) Samuel Şahin-Radlinger	(Germany) Hannover 96	Barnsley	Free
26 June 2019	(Belgium) Leandro Trossard	(Belgium) Genk	Brighton & Hove Albion	Undisclosed
26 June 2019	(Republic of Ireland) Stephen Ward	Burnley	Stoke City	Free
27 June 2019	(Portugal) Rafael Camacho	Liverpool	(Portugal) Sporting CP	£5m
27 June 2019	Joe Day	(Wales) Newport County	(Wales) Cardiff City	Free
27 June 2019	Frank Fielding	Bristol City	Millwall	Free
27 June 2019	Curtis Nelson	Oxford United	(Wales) Cardiff City	Free
27 June 2019	(Netherlands) Sepp van den Berg	(Netherlands) PEC Zwolle	Liverpool	£1.3m
27 June 2019	(Wales) Will Vaulks	Rotherham United	(Wales) Cardiff City	£2.1m
27 June 2019	(Northern Ireland) Conor Washington	Sheffield United	(Scotland) Heart of Midlothian	Free
28 June 2019	Chuks Aneke	Milton Keynes Dons	Charlton Athletic	Free
28 June 2019	(Netherlands) Ryan Babel	Fulham	(Turkey) Galatasaray	Free
28 June 2019	Dan Bentley	Brentford	Bristol City	Undisclosed
28 June 2019	Callum Burton	Hull City	Cambridge United	Free
28 June 2019	Martin Cranie	Sheffield United	Luton Town	Free
28 June 2019	James Justin	Luton Town	Leicester City	Undisclosed
28 June 2019	(Wales) Tom Lockyer	Bristol Rovers	Charlton Athletic	Free
28 June 2019	Sammie Szmodics	Colchester United	Bristol City	Undisclosed
28 June 2019	(Ecuador) Antonio Valencia	Manchester United	(Ecuador) LDU Quito	Free
28 June 2019	(Scotland) Jamie Walker	Wigan Athletic	(Scotland) Heart of Midlothian	Free
28 June 2019	Aaron Wan-Bissaka	Crystal Palace	Manchester United	£50m
29 June 2019	(Republic of Ireland) Luca Connell	Bolton Wanderers	(Scotland) Celtic	Undisclosed
1 July 2019	Che Adams	Birmingham City	Southampton	Undisclosed
1 July 2019	(Ivory Coast) Victorien Angban	Chelsea	(France) Metz	£5.4m
1 July 2019	(Northern Ireland) Steven Davis	Southampton	(Scotland) Rangers	Free
1 July 2019	Craig Dawson	West Bromwich Albion	Watford	Undisclosed
1 July 2019	(Portugal) Eduardo	Chelsea	(Portugal) Braga	Free
1 July 2019	Tariqe Fosu	Charlton Athletic	Oxford United	Undisclosed
1 July 2019	(Republic of Ireland) Rene Gilmartin	Colchester United	Bristol City	Free
1 July 2019	Danny Ings	Liverpool	Southampton	£20m
1 July 2019	(Finland) Anssi Jaakkola	Reading	Bristol Rovers	Free
1 July 2019	Lloyd Kelly	Bristol City	Bournemouth	Undisclosed
1 July 2019	Jack Kiersey	Everton	Walsall	Free
1 July 2019	(Croatia) Mateo Kovačić	(Spain) Real Madrid	Chelsea	£40m
1 July 2019	(Czech Republic) Aleš Matějů	Brighton & Hove Albion	(Italy) Brescia	Undisclosed
1 July 2019	Liam McCarron	Carlisle United	Leeds United	Undisclosed
1 July 2019	(Northern Ireland) Conor McLaughlin	Millwall	Sunderland	Free
1 July 2019	(Nigeria) John Obi Mikel	Middlesbrough	(Turkey) Trabzonspor	Free
1 July 2019	(Spain) Roberto	(Spain) Espanyol	West Ham United	Free
1 July 2019	Tommy Rowe	Doncaster Rovers	Bristol City	Free
1 July 2019	(Scotland) Graeme Shinnie	(Scotland) Aberdeen	Derby County	Free
1 July 2019	Matt Smith	Queens Park Rangers	Millwall	Undisclosed
1 July 2019	Matt Targett	Southampton	Aston Villa	Undisclosed
1 July 2019	Ryan Tunnicliffe	Millwall	Luton Town	Free
2 July 2019	Dominic Ball	Rotherham United	Queens Park Rangers	Free
2 July 2019	Jake Bidwell	Queens Park Rangers	(Wales) Swansea City	Free
2 July 2019	Jack Clarke	Leeds United	Tottenham Hotspur	Undisclosed
2 July 2019	Rohan Ince	Brighton & Hove Albion	Cheltenham Town	Free
2 July 2019	(Brazil) Gabriel Martinelli	(Brazil) Ituano	Arsenal	£6m
2 July 2019	(France) Tanguy Ndombele	(France) Lyon	Tottenham Hotspur	£53.8m
2 July 2019	Ethan Pinnock	Barnsley	Luton Town	Undisclosed
2 July 2019	Ben Purrington	Rotherham United	Charlton Athletic	Undisclosed
2 July 2019	Toby Sibbick	Wimbledon	Barnsley	Undisclosed
2 July 2019	(Denmark) Matthew Weaire	Brighton & Hove Albion	Colchester United	Free
3 July 2019	Nicky Ajose	Charlton Athletic	Exeter City	Free
3 July 2019	(Spain) Angeliño	(Netherlands) PSV Eindhoven	Manchester City	Undisclosed
3 July 2019	(Scotland) Paul Coutts	Sheffield United	Fleetwood Town	Free
3 July 2019	Luke Freeman	Queens Park Rangers	Sheffield United	Undisclosed
3 July 2019	Brendan Galloway	Everton	Luton Town	Free
3 July 2019	(Finland) Aapo Halme	Leeds United	Barnsley	Undisclosed
3 July 2019	(Republic of Ireland) Conor Masterson	Liverpool	Queens Park Rangers	Free
3 July 2019	Jack Payne	Huddersfield Town	Lincoln City	Free
4 July 2019	(Antigua and Barbuda) Daniel Bowry	Charlton Athletic	Cheltenham Town	Free
4 July 2019	(Spain) Ander Herrera	Manchester United	(France) Paris Saint-Germain	Free
4 July 2019	Phil Jagielka	Everton	Sheffield United	Free
4 July 2019	(Spain) Tomás Mejías	(Cyprus) Omonia	Middlesbrough	Free
4 July 2019	(Colombia) David Ospina	Arsenal	(Italy) Napoli	Undisclosed
4 July 2019	(Spain) Ayoze Pérez	Newcastle United	Leicester City	£30m
4 July 2019	(Spain) Rodri	(Spain) Atlético Madrid	Manchester City	£68.2m
4 July 2019	James Wilson	Manchester United	(Scotland) Aberdeen	Free
5 July 2019	(Senegal) Bambo Diaby	(Belgium) Lokeren	Barnsley	Undisclosed
5 July 2019	(Scotland) Aidan Fitzpatrick	(Scotland) Partick Thistle	Norwich City	£350k
5 July 2019	Jorge Grant	Nottingham Forest	Lincoln City	Undisclosed
5 July 2019	Bradley Johnson	Derby County	Blackburn Rovers	Free
5 July 2019	(Netherlands) Luciano Narsingh	(Wales) Swansea City	(Netherlands) Feyenoord	Free
5 July 2019	(France) Samir Nasri	West Ham United	(Belgium) Anderlecht	Free
5 July 2019	(United States) Matthew Olosunde	Manchester United	Rotherham United	Free
5 July 2019	(Portugal) Tiago Silva	(Portugal) Feirense	Nottingham Forest	Undisclosed
5 July 2019	Mallik Wilks	Leeds United	Barnsley	Undisclosed
6 July 2019	(Poland) Marcin Bułka	Chelsea	(France) Paris Saint-Germain	Free
6 July 2019	(Republic of Ireland) Stephen Henderson	Nottingham Forest	Crystal Palace	Free
6 July 2019	(Spain) David Raya	Blackburn Rovers	Brentford	Undisclosed
7 July 2019	(Austria) Marko Arnautović	West Ham United	(China) Shanghai SIPG	£22.4m
8 July 2019	(Uganda) Herbert Bockhorn	(Germany) Borussia Dortmund II	Huddersfield Town	Undisclosed
8 July 2019	(Sweden) Pontus Jansson	Leeds United	Brentford	Undisclosed
8 July 2019	(Republic of Ireland) Liam Kelly	Reading	(Netherlands) Feyenoord	Undisclosed
8 July 2019	Liam Kitching	Leeds United	Forest Green Rovers	Undisclosed
8 July 2019	(Scotland) David Marshall	Hull City	Wigan Athletic	Free
8 July 2019	Tyrone Mings	Bournemouth	Aston Villa	£20m
8 July 2019	(Netherlands) Erik Pieters	Stoke City	Burnley	Undisclosed
8 July 2019	(Portugal) Yuri Ribeiro	(Portugal) Benfica	Nottingham Forest	Undisclosed
8 July 2019	Jack Stacey	Luton Town	Bournemouth	£4m
8 July 2019	(Belgium) Youri Tielemans	(France) Monaco	Leicester City	£40m
9 July 2019	Conor Mahoney	Bournemouth	Millwall	Undisclosed
9 July 2019	(Belgium) Isaac Mbenza	(France) Montpellier	Huddersfield Town	Undisclosed
9 July 2019	(Spain) Alberto Moreno	Liverpool	(Spain) Villarreal	Free
9 July 2019	Alex Pattison	Middlesbrough	Wycombe Wanderers	Free
9 July 2019	Jay Rodriguez	West Bromwich Albion	Burnley	£10m
9 July 2019	(United States) Zack Steffen	(United States) Columbus Crew	Manchester City	Undisclosed
9 July 2019	Tom White	Gateshead	Blackburn Rovers	Undisclosed
10 July 2019	(Ghana) Albert Adomah	Aston Villa	Nottingham Forest	Free
10 July 2019	(Germany) Julian Börner	(Germany) Arminia Bielefeld	Sheffield Wednesday	Free
10 July 2019	Tom Eaves	Gillingham	Hull City	Free
10 July 2019	(Denmark) Mathias Jensen	(Spain) Celta Vigo	Brentford	Undisclosed
11 July 2019	Tyler Denton	Leeds United	Stevenage	Undisclosed
11 July 2019	Ezri Konsa	Brentford	Aston Villa	£12m
11 July 2019	Moses Odubajo	Brentford	Sheffield Wednesday	Free
12 July 2019	(Iran) Karim Ansarifard	Nottingham Forest	(Qatar) Al-Sailiya	Undisclosed
12 July 2019	(Iceland) Jón Daði Böðvarsson	Reading	Millwall	Undisclosed
12 July 2019	(Scotland) Lewis Macleod	Brentford	Wigan Athletic	Free
12 July 2019	(Republic of Ireland) Callum Robinson	Preston North End	Sheffield United	Undisclosed
13 July 2019	Sam Gallagher	Southampton	Blackburn Rovers	Undisclosed
13 July 2019	Kadeem Harris	(Wales) Cardiff City	Sheffield Wednesday	Free
15 July 2019	Ben Amos	Bolton Wanderers	Charlton Athletic	Free
15 July 2019	(Scotland) George Boyd	Sheffield Wednesday	Peterborough United	Free
15 July 2019	Fabian Delph	Manchester City	Everton	Undisclosed
15 July 2019	(Spain) Joselu	Newcastle United	(Spain) Alavés	Undisclosed
15 July 2019	(Guinea) Lamina Kaba Sherif	Leicester City	Accrington Stanley	Free
15 July 2019	(United States) Antonee Robinson	Everton	Wigan Athletic	Undisclosed
15 July 2019	Tommy Smith	Huddersfield Town	Stoke City	Undisclosed
16 July 2019	Ben Barclay	Brighton & Hove Albion	Accrington Stanley	Free
16 July 2019	Sam Byram	West Ham United	Norwich City	£750k
16 July 2019	(Belgium) Björn Engels	(France) Reims	Aston Villa	Undisclosed
16 July 2019	Rhys Healey	(Wales) Cardiff City	Milton Keynes Dons	Undisclosed
16 July 2019	Ravel Morrison	(Sweden) Östersund	Sheffield United	Free
16 July 2019	(Mali) Hadi Sacko	Leeds United	(Turkey) Denizlispor	Undisclosed
17 July 2019	(Republic of Ireland) Dominic Bernard	Birmingham City	Forest Green Rovers	Free
17 July 2019	(France) Sébastien Haller	(Germany) Eintracht Frankfurt	West Ham United	£45m
17 July 2019	David Nugent	Derby County	Preston North End	Free
17 July 2019	Kieran Trippier	Tottenham Hotspur	(Spain) Atlético Madrid	£20m
18 July 2019	Nick Blackman	Derby County	(Israel) Maccabi Tel Aviv	Free
18 July 2019	Daniel Crowley	(Netherlands) Willem II	Birmingham City	Undisclosed
18 July 2019	(Spain) Oriol Rey	Leeds United	(Spain) Valladolid	Undisclosed
18 July 2019	(Spain) Samuel Sáiz	Leeds United	(Spain) Girona	Undisclosed
18 July 2019	Ryan Tafazolli	Peterborough United	Hull City	Free
19 July 2019	Conor Chaplin	Coventry City	Barnsley	Undisclosed
19 July 2019	(Gabon) Bruno Ecuele Manga	(Wales) Cardiff City	(France) Dijon	Undisclosed
19 July 2019	Aden Flint	Middlesbrough	(Wales) Cardiff City	£4m
19 July 2019	Michael Morrison	Birmingham City	Reading	Free
19 July 2019	(Venezuela) Salomón Rondón	West Bromwich Albion	(China) Dalian Yifang	Undisclosed
19 July 2019	(Croatia) Simon Sluga	(Croatia) Rijeka	Luton Town	£1.34m
19 July 2019	(Denmark) Kenneth Zohore	(Wales) Cardiff City	West Bromwich Albion	Undisclosed
20 July 2019	(Nigeria) Semi Ajayi	Rotherham United	West Bromwich Albion	Undisclosed
21 July 2019	(France) Lys Mousset	Bournemouth	Sheffield United	£10m
22 July 2019	(Scotland) Charlie Adam	Stoke City	Reading	Free
22 July 2019	Dillon Barnes	Colchester United	Queens Park Rangers	Undisclosed
22 July 2019	Deji Oshilaja	Wimbledon	Charlton Athletic	Free
23 July 2019	Darnell Furlong	Queens Park Rangers	West Bromwich Albion	Undisclosed
23 July 2019	(Netherlands) Vincent Janssen	Tottenham Hotspur	(Mexico) Monterrey	Undisclosed
23 July 2019	(Brazil) Joelinton	(Germany) 1899 Hoffenheim	Newcastle United	Undisclosed
23 July 2019	Jamie Mascoll	Charlton Athletic	Wycombe Wanderers	Free
23 July 2019	(Scotland) Jack Ruddy	Wolverhampton Wanderers	(Scotland) Ross County	Free
24 July 2019	(Finland) Alex Bradley	West Bromwich Albion	Lincoln City	Free
24 July 2019	(Denmark) Martin Braithwaite	Middlesbrough	(Spain) Leganés	Undisclosed
24 July 2019	(Nigeria) Tom Dele-Bashiru	Manchester City	Watford	Free
24 July 2019	(Equatorial Guinea) Pedro Obiang	West Ham United	(Italy) Sassuolo	Undisclosed
24 July 2019	(Egypt) Trézéguet	(Turkey) Kasımpaşa	Aston Villa	£8.75m
25 July 2019	Tristan Abrahams	Norwich City	(Wales) Newport County	Free
25 July 2019	(Ghana) Jordan Ayew	(Wales) Swansea City	Crystal Palace	£2.5m
25 July 2019	(United States) Geoff Cameron	Stoke City	Queens Park Rangers	Free
25 July 2019	Kellan Gordon	Derby County	Mansfield Town	Undisclosed
25 July 2019	Ademola Lookman	Everton	(Germany) RB Leipzig	£22.5m
25 July 2019	(Brazil) Douglas Luiz	Manchester City	Aston Villa	£15m
25 July 2019	(Jamaica) Mark Marshall	Charlton Athletic	Gillingham	Free
25 July 2019	(France) William Saliba	(France) Saint-Étienne	Arsenal	£27m
26 July 2019	Luke Armstrong	Middlesbrough	Salford City	Undisclosed
26 July 2019	Marcus Browne	West Ham United	Middlesbrough	Undisclosed
26 July 2019	(Australia) Jordan Lyden	Aston Villa	Swindon Town	Free
26 July 2019	(Republic of Ireland) Sean McLoughlin	(Republic of Ireland) Cork City	Hull City	Undisclosed
26 July 2019	Ben Osborn	Nottingham Forest	Sheffield United	Undisclosed
26 July 2019	(Croatia) Ivan Šunjić	(Croatia) Dinamo Zagreb	Birmingham City	Undisclosed
27 July 2019	Todd Kane	Chelsea	Queens Park Rangers	Free
27 July 2019	Marc Pugh	Bournemouth	Queens Park Rangers	Free
27 July 2019	(Saint Kitts and Nevis) Romaine Sawyers	Brentford	West Bromwich Albion	Undisclosed
28 July 2019	Marc Bola	Blackpool	Middlesbrough	Undisclosed
28 July 2019	(Spain) Iván Guzmán	(Spain) Olot	Birmingham City	Free
28 July 2019	(Spain) Agus Medina	(Spain) Cornellà	Birmingham City	Undisclosed
28 July 2019	(Mali) Bakary Sako	Crystal Palace	(Turkey) Denizlispor	Free
29 July 2019	(Denmark) Philip Billing	Huddersfield Town	Bournemouth	£15m
29 July 2019	Aaron Hayden	Wolverhampton Wanderers	Carlisle United	Free
30 July 2019	(Scotland) Theo Archibald	Brentford	Macclesfield Town	Free
30 July 2019	Jacob Butterfield	Derby County	Luton Town	Free
30 July 2019	(Italy) Patrick Cutrone	(Italy) Milan	Wolverhampton Wanderers	£16m
30 July 2019	(Senegal) Idrissa Gueye	Everton	(France) Paris Saint-Germain	£30m
30 July 2019	(Wales) Lloyd Isgrove	Barnsley	Swindon Town	Free
30 July 2019	Jason McCarthy	Wycombe Wanderers	Millwall	Undisclosed
30 July 2019	(Japan) Shinji Okazaki	Leicester City	(Spain) Málaga	Free
30 July 2019	(Nigeria) Fred Onyedinma	Millwall	Wycombe Wanderers	Undisclosed
30 July 2019	(Austria) Markus Suttner	Brighton & Hove Albion	(Germany) Fortuna Düsseldorf	Undisclosed
30 July 2019	David Wheeler	Queens Park Rangers	Wycombe Wanderers	Free
30 July 2019	(Northern Ireland) Gavin Whyte	Oxford United	(Wales) Cardiff City	Undisclosed
31 July 2019	(Germany) Robert Glatzel	(Germany) 1. FC Heidenheim	(Wales) Cardiff City	Undisclosed
31 July 2019	(Ecuador) Joel Valencia	(Poland) Piast Gliwice	Brentford	Undisclosed
31 July 2019	Joe Williams	Everton	Wigan Athletic	Undisclosed
1 August 2019	(Netherlands) Arnaut Danjuma	(Belgium) Club Brugge	Bournemouth	£13.7m
1 August 2019	(Hungary) Dániel Gyollai	Stoke City	Wigan Athletic	Free
1 August 2019	Tom Heaton	Burnley	Aston Villa	£8m
1 August 2019	Jamal Lowe	Portsmouth	Wigan Athletic	Undisclosed
1 August 2019	(Belgium) Dodi Lukebakio	Watford	(Germany) Hertha BSC	Undisclosed
1 August 2019	Elliott Moore	Leicester City	Oxford United	Undisclosed
1 August 2019	(Scotland) Steven Naismith	Norwich City	(Scotland) Heart of Midlothian	Free
1 August 2019	(Zimbabwe) Marvelous Nakamba	(Belgium) Club Brugge	Aston Villa	Undisclosed
1 August 2019	Joe Nuttall	Blackburn Rovers	Blackpool	Undisclosed
1 August 2019	Kasey Palmer	Chelsea	Bristol City	Undisclosed
1 August 2019	(Antigua and Barbuda) Josh Parker	Charlton Athletic	Wycombe Wanderers	Free
1 August 2019	(Ivory Coast) Nicolas Pépé	(France) Lille	Arsenal	£72m
1 August 2019	(Northern Ireland) Ben Reeves	Charlton Athletic	Milton Keynes Dons	Free
1 August 2019	(Montenegro) Oliver Sarkic	Leeds United	Burton Albion	Free
1 August 2019	(Mali) Samba Sow	(Russia) Dynamo Moscow	Nottingham Forest	Undisclosed
2 August 2019	Alex Baptiste	Queens Park Rangers	Doncaster Rovers	Free
2 August 2019	Tom Bayliss	Coventry City	Preston North End	Undisclosed
2 August 2019	(Poland) Krystian Bielik	Arsenal	Derby County	Undisclosed
2 August 2019	Cohen Bramall	Arsenal	Colchester United	Free
2 August 2019	(Ivory Coast) Jean-Philippe Gbamin	(Germany) Mainz 05	Everton	£25m
2 August 2019	George Honeyman	Sunderland	Hull City	Undisclosed
2 August 2019	(Portugal) Bruno Jordão	(Italy) Lazio	Wolverhampton Wanderers	Undisclosed
2 August 2019	(Scotland) Oli McBurnie	(Wales) Swansea City	Sheffield United	£17.5m
2 August 2019	(Portugal) Pedro Neto	(Italy) Lazio	Wolverhampton Wanderers	Undisclosed
2 August 2019	Reece Oxford	West Ham United	(Germany) FC Augsburg	Undisclosed
2 August 2019	(Northern Ireland) Bailey Peacock-Farrell	Leeds United	Burnley	£2.5m
2 August 2019	(Sweden) Kristoffer Peterson	(Netherlands) Heracles Almelo	(Wales) Swansea City	Undisclosed
2 August 2019	Liam Ridgewell	Hull City	Southend United	Free
2 August 2019	(France) Allan Saint-Maximin	(France) Nice	Newcastle United	£20m
3 August 2019	Adam Webster	Bristol City	Brighton & Hove Albion	£20m
3 August 2019	James Weir	Hull City	Bolton Wanderers	Free
4 August 2019	(Italy) Moise Kean	(Italy) Juventus	Everton	Undisclosed
4 August 2019	(Belgium) Simon Mignolet	Liverpool	(Belgium) Club Brugge	£6.4m
5 August 2019	(Spain) Adrián	West Ham United	Liverpool	Free
5 August 2019	Gary Cahill	Chelsea	Crystal Palace	Free
5 August 2019	(Japan) Yosuke Ideguchi	Leeds United	(Japan) Gamba Osaka	Undisclosed
5 August 2019	Harry Maguire	Leicester City	Manchester United	£80m
5 August 2019	(France) Neal Maupay	Brentford	Brighton & Hove Albion	Undisclosed
5 August 2019	(France) Han-Noah Massengo	(France) Monaco	Bristol City	Undisclosed
5 August 2019	(France) Bryan Mbeumo	(France) Troyes	Brentford	Undisclosed
5 August 2019	(Wales) Kieffer Moore	Barnsley	Wigan Athletic	Undisclosed
5 August 2019	(Australia) Joel Rollinson	Reading	Stevenage	Free
5 August 2019	Dru Yearwood	Southend United	Brentford	Undisclosed
6 August 2019	(Portugal) Gonçalo Cardoso	(Portugal) Boavista	West Ham United	£2.75m
6 August 2019	(Azerbaijan) Renat Dadashov	(Portugal) Estoril Praia	Wolverhampton Wanderers	Undisclosed
6 August 2019	(Wales) Ched Evans	Sheffield United	Fleetwood Town	Undisclosed
6 August 2019	(Spain) Álvaro Giménez	(Spain) Almería	Birmingham City	£1.4m
6 August 2019	(Portugal) Lucas João	Sheffield Wednesday	Reading	Undisclosed
6 August 2019	Paul Jones	Fleetwood Town	Sheffield Wednesday	Free
6 August 2019	(France) Laurent Koscielny	Arsenal	(France) Bordeaux	£4.6m
6 August 2019	(Northern Ireland) Caolan Lavery	Sheffield United	Walsall	Undisclosed
6 August 2019	Jason Puncheon	Crystal Palace	(Cyprus) Pafos	Free
6 August 2019	(Brazil) Rafael	(Italy) Sampdoria	Reading	Free
6 August 2019	Kemar Roofe	Leeds United	(Belgium) Anderlecht	Undisclosed
6 August 2019	(Senegal) Pape Souaré	Crystal Palace	(France) Troyes	Free
7 August 2019	(Portugal) João Cancelo	(Italy) Juventus	Manchester City	£60m
7 August 2019	(Brazil) Danilo	Manchester City	(Italy) Juventus	£34.1m
7 August 2019	(Netherlands) Anfernee Dijksteel	Charlton Athletic	Middlesbrough	Undisclosed
7 August 2019	Carl Jenkinson	Arsenal	Nottingham Forest	Undisclosed
7 August 2019	(Republic of Ireland) James McCarthy	Everton	Crystal Palace	£3m
7 August 2019	(Romania) George Pușcaș	(Italy) Inter Milan	Reading	Undisclosed
7 August 2019	(Republic of the Congo) Brice Samba	(France) Caen	Nottingham Forest	Undisclosed
7 August 2019	(Spain) Fran Villalba	(Spain) Valencia	Birmingham City	Free
7 August 2019	Danny Welbeck	Arsenal	Watford	Free
8 August 2019	(Switzerland) Albian Ajeti	(Switzerland) Basel	West Ham United	Undisclosed
8 August 2019	Charlie Austin	Southampton	West Bromwich Albion	£4m
8 August 2019	Andy Carroll	West Ham United	Newcastle United	Free
8 August 2019	(Spain) Chema	(Spain) Levante	Nottingham Forest	Undisclosed
8 August 2019	(Australia) Callum Elder	Leicester City	Hull City	Undisclosed
8 August 2019	(Nigeria) Alex Iwobi	Arsenal	Everton	£28m
8 August 2019	(Sweden) Emil Krafth	(France) Amiens	Newcastle United	Undisclosed
8 August 2019	(Portugal) Leonardo Lopes	Wigan Athletic	Hull City	Undisclosed
8 August 2019	(Brazil) David Luiz	Chelsea	Arsenal	Undisclosed
8 August 2019	(Belgium) Romelu Lukaku	Manchester United	(Italy) Inter Milan	£74m
8 August 2019	(Australia) Massimo Luongo	Queens Park Rangers	Sheffield Wednesday	Undisclosed
8 August 2019	(Northern Ireland) Josh Magennis	Bolton Wanderers	Hull City	Undisclosed
8 August 2019	(Wales) Steve Morison	Millwall	Shrewsbury Town	Free
8 August 2019	(Hungary) Ádám Nagy	(Italy) Bologna	Bristol City	Undisclosed
8 August 2019	(Kenya) Clarke Oduor	Leeds United	Barnsley	Undisclosed
8 August 2019	Josh Onomah	Tottenham Hotspur	Fulham	Part-exchange
8 August 2019	Marlon Pack	Bristol City	(Wales) Cardiff City	Undisclosed
8 August 2019	Tom Pearce	Leeds United	Wigan Athletic	Undisclosed
8 August 2019	(Belgium) Dennis Praet	(Italy) Sampdoria	Leicester City	Undisclosed
8 August 2019	(Senegal) Ismaila Sarr	(France) Rennes	Watford	Undisclosed
8 August 2019	(Austria) Patrick Schmidt	(Austria) Admira Wacker	Barnsley	Undisclosed
8 August 2019	Ryan Sessegnon	Fulham	Tottenham Hotspur	£25m
8 August 2019	(Germany) Meritan Shabani	(Germany) Bayern Munich	Wolverhampton Wanderers	Undisclosed
8 August 2019	Dominic Thompson	Arsenal	Brentford	Undisclosed
8 August 2019	(Scotland) Kieran Tierney	(Scotland) Celtic	Arsenal	Undisclosed
8 August 2019	Isaac Vassell	Birmingham City	(Wales) Cardiff City	Undisclosed
8 August 2019	(Netherlands) Michael Verrips	(Belgium) Mechelen	Sheffield United	Free
8 August 2019	(France) Romaric Yapi	(France) Paris Saint-Germain	Brighton & Hove Albion	Undisclosed

== Loans ==
Start date	End date	Name	Moving from	Moving to
1 February 2019	31 May 2019	(Belgium) Michy Batshuayi	Chelsea	Crystal Palace
1 February 2019	31 May 2019	Shaun Hobson	Bournemouth	Eastleigh
1 February 2019	31 May 2019	(France) Aboubakar Kamara	Fulham	(Turkey) Yeni Malatyaspor
1 February 2019	31 May 2019	(Mali) Molla Wagué	(Italy) Udinese	Nottingham Forest
2 February 2019	31 May 2019	(South Africa) Siph Mdlalose	Southampton	Salisbury
4 February 2019	31 October 2019	Caleb Richards	Norwich City	(United States) Tampa Bay Rowdies
5 February 2019	31 October 2019	(Republic of Ireland) Jordan Doherty	Sheffield United	(United States) Tampa Bay Rowdies
6 February 2019	7 March 2019	(Wales) Joseph Low	Bristol City	Dorchester Town
7 February 2019	29 March 2019	Andy Lonergan	Middlesbrough	Rochdale
8 February 2019	9 March 2019	Andy Fisher	Blackburn Rovers	FC United of Manchester
8 February 2019	9 March 2019	Lewis Hardcastle	Blackburn Rovers	Barrow
8 February 2019	23 February 2019	David Stockdale	Birmingham City	Coventry City
9 February 2019	10 March 2019	Matthew Platt	Blackburn Rovers	Southport
10 February 2019	1 January 2020	(Italy) Vito Mannone	Reading	(United States) Minnesota United
25 February 2019	31 July 2019	(Finland) Niko Hämäläinen	Queens Park Rangers	(United States) Los Angeles FC
26 February 2019	1 January 2020	(Nigeria) Sone Aluko	Reading	(China) Beijing Renhe
12 April 2019	19 April 2019	Alex Palmer	West Bromwich Albion	Notts County
30 May 2019	30 June 2020	Patrick Roberts	Manchester City	Norwich City
10 June 2019	30 June 2020	Jonjoe Kenny	Everton	(Germany) Schalke 04
18 June 2019	30 June 2020	Sheyi Ojo	Liverpool	(Scotland) Rangers
19 June 2019	31 May 2020	Nathan Baxter	Chelsea	(Scotland) Ross County
19 June 2019	30 June 2020	(Argentina) Alexis Mac Allister	Brighton & Hove Albion	(Argentina) Boca Juniors
19 June 2019	30 June 2020	(Wales) Steve Morison	Millwall	Shewsbury Town
24 June 2019	30 June 2020	Nathan Trott	West Ham United	Wimbledon
25 June 2019	30 June 2020	James Morton	Bristol City	Forest Green Rovers
26 June 2019	24 May 2020	Richard Nartey	Chelsea	Burton Albion
26 June 2019	30 June 2020	Mikael Ndjoli	Bournemouth	Gillingham
26 June 2019	30 June 2020	(Montenegro) Matija Sarkic	Aston Villa	(Scotland) Livingston
27 June 2019	30 June 2020	(Wales) Joe Morrell	Bristol City	Lincoln City
27 June 2019	30 June 2020	(Australia) Aiden O'Neill	Burnley	(Australia) Brisbane Roar
27 June 2019	30 June 2020	Sean Raggett	Norwich City	Portsmouth
28 June 2019	30 June 2020	(Netherlands) Jay-Roy Grot	Leeds United	(Netherlands) Vitesse
29 June 2019	30 June 2020	Jerome Sinclair	Watford	(Netherlands) VVV-Venlo
1 July 2019	30 June 2020	Luke Amos	Tottenham Hotspur	Queens Park Rangers
1 July 2019	30 June 2020	Ryan Giles	Wolverhampton Wanderers	Shrewsbury Town
1 July 2019	30 June 2020	(Serbia) Marko Grujić	Liverpool	(Germany) Hertha BSC
1 July 2019	30 June 2020	(Wales) Mark Harris	(Wales) Cardiff City	(Wales) Wrexham
1 July 2019	30 June 2020	Jack Harrison	Manchester City	Leeds United
1 July 2019	30 June 2020	(Wales) Chris Maxwell	Preston North End	(Scotland) Hibernian
1 July 2019	30 June 2020	(Wales) Matthew Smith	Manchester City	Queens Park Rangers
1 July 2019	30 June 2020	Nathan Thomas	Sheffield United	Gillingham
1 July 2019	30 June 2020	Ben White	Brighton & Hove Albion	Leeds United
2 July 2019	30 June 2020	Jack Clarke	Tottenham Hotspur	Leeds United
2 July 2019	4 January 2020	Devante Cole	Wigan Athletic	(Scotland) Motherwell
2 July 2019	31 December 2019	(United States) Emerson Hyndman	Bournemouth	(United States) Atlanta United
2 July 2019	30 June 2020	Alfie Jones	Southampton	Gillingham
2 July 2019	30 June 2020	(Wales) Rhys Norrington-Davies	Sheffield United	Rochdale
2 July 2019	30 June 2020	(Spain) Sandro Ramírez	Everton	(Spain) Valladolid
3 July 2019	30 June 2020	(Northern Ireland) Daniel Ballard	Arsenal	Swindon Town
3 July 2019	30 June 2020	Daniel Barlaser	Newcastle United	Rotherham United
3 July 2019	30 June 2020	(Portugal) Hélder Costa	Wolverhampton Wanderers	Leeds United
3 July 2019	30 June 2020	(Croatia) Mario Pašalić	Chelsea	(Italy) Atalanta
3 July 2019	30 June 2020	Cameron Pring	Bristol City	Walsall
3 July 2019	30 June 2020	Rekeil Pyke	Huddersfield Town	Rochdale
4 July 2019	30 June 2020	(Republic of Ireland) Simon Power	Norwich City	(Scotland) Ross County
5 July 2019	30 June 2020	Lewie Coyle	Leeds United	Fleetwood Town
5 July 2019	30 June 2020	Robbie Cundy	Bristol City	Exeter City
5 July 2019	30 June 2020	Jake Eastwood	Sheffield United	Scunthorpe United
5 July 2019	30 June 2020	(Germany) Ralf Fährmann	(Germany) Schalke 04	Norwich City
5 July 2019	30 June 2020	(Croatia) Filip Krovinović	(Portugal) Benfica	West Bromwich Albion
5 July 2019	30 June 2020	(Belgium) Charly Musonda	Chelsea	(Netherlands) Vitesse
5 July 2019	30 June 2020	Max O'Leary	Bristol City	Shrewsbury Town
5 July 2019	30 June 2020	(Egypt) Ramadan Sobhi	Huddersfield Town	(Egypt) Al Ahly
5 July 2019	30 June 2020	(Slovenia) Gregor Zabret	(Wales) Swansea City	Oldham Athletic
8 July 2019	1 January 2020	(Brazil) Nathan	Chelsea	(Brazil) Atlético Mineiro
8 July 2019	30 June 2020	(Republic of Ireland) Kieran O'Hara	Manchester United	Burton Albion
8 July 2019	30 June 2020	Jack Rose	Southampton	Walsall
8 July 2019	30 June 2020	(Portugal) Alfa Semedo	(Portugal) Benfica	Nottingham Forest
9 July 2019	30 June 2020	Michael Folivi	Watford	Wimbledon
9 July 2019	30 June 2020	(Kosovo) Arijanet Muric	Manchester City	Nottingham Forest
9 July 2019	30 June 2020	(United States) Zack Steffen	Manchester City	(Germany) Fortuna Düsseldorf
10 July 2019	30 June 2020	Tyler Smith	Sheffield United	Bristol Rovers
11 July 2019	30 June 2020	Kieran Dowell	Everton	Derby County
11 July 2019	30 June 2020	(Portugal) João Virgínia	Everton	Reading
12 July 2019	30 June 2020	Luke Garbutt	Everton	Ipswich Town
12 July 2019	30 June 2020	(Germany) Michael Luyambula	Birmingham City	Crawley Town
12 July 2019	30 June 2020	George Nurse	Bristol City	(Wales) Newport County
12 July 2019	30 June 2020	Ben Sheaf	Arsenal	Doncaster Rovers
13 July 2019	30 June 2020	(Portugal) Ivan Cavaleiro	Wolverhampton Wanderers	Fulham
15 July 2019	30 June 2020	(Poland) Kamil Grabara	Liverpool	Huddersfield Town
15 July 2019	30 June 2020	(Switzerland) Shani Tarashaj	Everton	(Netherlands) Emmen
17 July 2019	1 January 2020	Liam Gibson	Newcastle United	Grismby Town
17 July 2019	30 June 2020	Alex Palmer	West Bromwich Albion	Plymouth Argyle
17 July 2019	30 June 2020	(Netherlands) Philippe Sandler	Manchester City	(Belgium) Anderlecht
17 July 2019	30 June 2020	Josh Tymon	Stoke City	(Portugal) Famalicão
18 July 2019	30 June 2020	Josh Bowler	Everton	Hull City
18 July 2019	31 May 2020	Luke McCormick	Chelsea	Shrewsbury Town
18 July 2019	30 June 2020	(Ivory Coast) Jean Michaël Seri	Fulham	(Turkey) Galatasaray
18 July 2019	30 June 2020	(Australia) Harry Souttar	Stoke City	Fleetwood Town
18 July 2019	30 June 2020	(Norway) Leo Skiri Østigård	Brighton & Hove Albion	(Germany) St. Pauli
19 July 2019	30 June 2020	(Northern Ireland) Paul Smyth	Queens Park Rangers	Wycombe Wanderers
21 July 2019	30 June 2020	(France) Anthony Knockaert	Brighton & Hove Albion	Fulham
22 July 2019	30 June 2020	(Wales) Ethan Ampadu	Chelsea	(Germany) RB Leipzig
22 July 2019	30 June 2020	(Denmark) Daniel Iversen	Leicester City	Rotherham Town
22 July 2019	30 June 2020	(United States) Giles Phillips	Queens Park Rangers	Wycombe Wanderers
23 July 2019	30 June 2020	(Republic of Ireland) Jayson Molumby	Brighton & Hove Albion	Millwall
23 July 2019	30 June 2020	Christian Walton	Brighton & Hove Albion	Blackburn Rovers
24 July 2019	30 June 2020	Jake Clarke-Salter	Chelsea	Birmingham City
24 July 2019	30 June 2020	(Scotland) Marc McNulty	Reading	Sunderland
24 July 2019	30 June 2020	(United States) Matt Miazga	Chelsea	Reading
24 July 2019	30 June 2020	(Slovenia) Jan Mlakar	Brighton & Hove Albion	Queens Park Rangers
24 July 2019	30 June 2020	(Spain) Robert Sánchez	Brighton & Hove Albion	Rochdale
24 July 2019	30 June 2020	Nathan Thomas	Sheffield United	Carlisle United
31 July 2019	30 June 2020	Tosin Adarabioyo	Manchester City	Blackburn Rovers
31 July 2019	30 June 2020	Danny McNamara	Millwall	(Wales) Newport County
31 July 2019	30 June 2020	(Spain) Moha Ramos	(Spain) Real Madrid	Birmingham City
1 August 2019	30 June 2020	(Belgium) Rocky Bushiri	Norwich City	Blackpool
1 August 2019	30 June 2020	(Republic of Ireland) Canice Carroll	Brentford	Carlisle United
1 August 2019	30 June 2020	(Republic of Ireland) Jake Doyle-Hayes	Aston Villa	Cheltenham Town
1 August 2019	30 June 2020	Andre Green	Aston Villa	Preston North End
1 August 2019	30 June 2020	Taylor Maloney	Charlton Athletic	(Wales) Newport County
1 August 2019	30 June 2020	Dujon Sterling	Chelsea	Wigan Athletic
1 August 2019	30 June 2020	Freddie Woodman	Newcastle United	(Wales) Swansea City
2 August 2019	30 June 2020	(Argentina) Lucas Boyé	(Italy) Torino	Reading
2 August 2019	30 June 2020	(Wales) Nathan Broadhead	Everton	Burton Albion
2 August 2019	30 June 2020	Josef Buršík	Stoke City	Accrington Stanley
2 August 2019	30 June 2020	Matthew Clarke	Brighton & Hove Albion	Derby County
2 August 2019	30 June 2020	Niall Ennis	Wolverhampton Wanderers	Doncaster Rovers
2 August 2019	30 June 2020	Conor Gallagher	Chelsea	Charlton Athletic
2 August 2019	30 June 2020	Rushian Hepburn-Murphy	Aston Villa	Tranmere Rovers
2 August 2019	30 June 2020	Diallang Jaiyesimi	Norwich City	Swindon Town
2 August 2019	30 June 2020	Cameron John	Wolverhampton Wanderers	Doncaster Rovers
2 August 2019	30 June 2020	Josh Knight	Leicester City	Peterborough United
2 August 2019	30 June 2020	Ryan Loft	Leicester City	Carlisle United
2 August 2019	1 January 2020	(Republic of Ireland) Sean McLoughlin	Hull City	(Scotland) St Mirren
2 August 2019	30 June 2020	Sam Smith	Reading	Cambridge United
2 August 2019	30 June 2020	Tyler Walker	Nottingham Forest	Lincoln City
2 August 2019	30 June 2020	(Netherlands) Jetro Willems	(Germany) Eintracht Frankfurt	Newcastle United
4 August 2019	30 June 2020	(Norway) Alexander Sørloth	Crystal Palace	(Turkey) Trabzonspor
5 August 2019	30 June 2020	(France) Aldo Kalulu	(Switzerland) Basel	(Wales) Swansea City
6 August 2019	30 June 2020	(Republic of Ireland) Harry Arter	Bournemouth	Fulham
6 August 2019	30 June 2020	(Nigeria) Taiwo Awoniyi	Liverpool	(Germany) Mainz 05
6 August 2019	30 June 2020	(Azerbaijan) Renat Dadashov	Wolverhampton Wanderers	(Portugal) Paços de Ferreira
6 August 2019	30 June 2020	(Canada) Liam Millar	Liverpool	(Scotland) Kilmarnock
6 August 2019	30 June 2020	(Guinea) Pelé	(France) Monaco	Reading
6 August 2019	30 June 2020	Sam Surridge	Bournemouth	(Wales) Swansea City
6 August 2019	30 June 2020	(Wales) Harry Wilson	Liverpool	Bournemouth
7 August 2019	30 June 2020	(France) Ibrahim Amadou	(Spain) Sevilla	Norwich City
7 August 2019	30 June 2020	(Spain) Víctor Camarasa	(Spain) Real Betis	Crystal Palace
7 August 2019	30 June 2020	(Republic of Ireland) Josh Cullen	West Ham United	Charlton Athletic
7 August 2019	30 June 2020	(Republic of Ireland) Scott Hogan	Aston Villa	Stoke City
7 August 2019	30 June 2020	Layton Ndukwu	Leicester City	Southend United
7 August 2019	30 June 2020	(Portugal) Pedro Pereira	(Portugal) Benfica	Bristol City
7 August 2019	30 June 2020	Nathaniel Phillips	Liverpool	(Germany) VfB Stuttgart
7 August 2019	30 June 2020	(France) Djibril Sidibé	(France) Monaco	Everton
7 August 2019	30 June 2020	Sam Stubbs	Middlesbrough	(Scotland) Hamilton Academical
7 August 2019	30 June 2020	Joe Wollacott	Bristol City	Forest Green Rovers
8 August 2019	30 June 2020	(Democratic Republic of the Congo) Benik Afobe	Stoke City	Bristol City
8 August 2019	30 June 2020	(Scotland) David Bates	(Germany) Hamburger SV	Sheffield Wednesday
8 August 2019	30 June 2020	(Bosnia and Herzegovina) Muhamed Bešić	Everton	Sheffield United
8 August 2019	30 June 2020	Luke Bolton	Manchester City	Luton Town
8 August 2019	30 June 2020	John Bostock	(France) Toulouse	Nottingham Forest
8 August 2019	30 June 2020	James Bree	Aston Villa	Luton Town
8 August 2019	30 June 2020	Izzy Brown	Chelsea	Luton Town
8 August 2019	30 June 2020	Scott Carson	Derby County	Manchester City
8 August 2019	30 June 2020	(United States) Cameron Carter-Vickers	Tottenham Hotspur	Stoke City
8 August 2019	30 June 2020	Trevoh Chalobah	Chelsea	Huddersfield Town
8 August 2019	30 June 2020	(Republic of Ireland) Greg Cunningham	(Wales) Cardiff City	Blackburn Rovers
8 August 2019	30 June 2020	Josh Dacres-Cogley	Birmingham City	Crawley Town
8 August 2019	30 June 2020	Grady Diangana	West Ham United	West Bromwich Albion
8 August 2019	6 January 2020	Danny Drinkwater	Chelsea	Burnley
8 August 2019	30 June 2020	Mark Duffy	Sheffield United	Stoke City
8 August 2019	30 June 2020	Ovie Ejaria	Liverpool	Reading
8 August 2019	30 June 2020	(Nigeria) Bright Enobakhare	Wolvherhampton Wanderers	Wigan Athletic
8 August 2019	30 June 2020	Sam Field	West Bromwich Albion	Charlton Athletic
8 August 2019	1 January 2020	Harrison Foulkes	Hull City	Pickering Town
8 August 2019	1 January 2020	Josh Grant	Chelsea	Plymouth Argyle
8 August 2019	1 January 2020	Jacob Greaves	Hull City	Cheltenham Town
8 August 2019	30 June 2020	Ben Hamer	Huddersfield Town	Derby County
8 August 2019	30 June 2020	Jonathan Leko	West Bromwich Albion	Charlton Athletic
8 August 2019	30 June 2020	(Argentina) Giovani Lo Celso	(Spain) Real Betis	Tottenham Hotspur
8 August 2019	30 June 2020	(Israel) Beram Kayal	Brighton & Hove Albion	Charlton Athletic
8 August 2019	30 June 2020	Jacob Maddox	Chelsea	Tranmere Rovers
8 August 2019	30 June 2020	Tyler Magloire	Blackburn Rovers	Rochdale
8 August 2019	30 June 2020	(France) Illan Meslier	(France) Lorient	Leeds United
8 August 2019	30 June 2020	(Australia) Aaron Mooy	Huddersfield Town	Brighton & Hove Albion
8 August 2019	30 June 2020	Jacob Murphy	Newcastle United	Sheffield Wednesday
8 August 2019	30 June 2020	Eddie Nketiah	Arsenal	Leeds United
8 August 2019	30 June 2020	Jamie Paterson	Bristol City	Derby County
8 August 2019	30 June 2020	Matthew Pennington	Everton	Hull City
8 August 2019	30 June 2020	(Brazil) Matheus Pereira	(Portugal) Sporting CP	West Bromwich Albion
8 August 2019	30 June 2020	Harrison Reed	Southampton	Fulham
8 August 2019	30 June 2020	(Jamaica) Bobby Reid	(Wales) Cardiff City	Fulham
8 August 2019	1 January 2020	Luke Steele	Nottingham Forest	Millwall
8 August 2019	30 June 2020	Zak Vyner	Bristol City	(Scotland) Aberdeen
8 August 2019	30 June 2020	(Bermuda) Nahki Wells	Burnley	Queens Park Rangers
8 August 2019	30 June 2020	Chris Willock	(Portugal) Benfica B	West Bromwich Albion
29 August 2019	30 June 2020	(Chile) Alexis Sánchez	Manchester United	(Italy) Inter Milan
30 August 2019	30 June 2020	Jake Taylor	Nottingham Forest	Port Vale
