= List of English football transfers winter 2018–19 =

The 2018–19 winter transfer window for English football transfers opened on 1 January and closed on 1 February 2019. Additionally, players without a club could join at any time, clubs could sign players on loan at any time, and clubs could sign a goalkeeper on an emergency loan if they had no registered goalkeeper available. This list includes transfers featuring at least one Premier League or EFL club which were completed after the end of the summer 2018 transfer window and before the end of the 2018–19 winter window.

== Transfers ==
All players and clubs without a flag are English. Note that while Cardiff City and Swansea City are affiliated with the Football Association of Wales and thus take the Welsh flag, they play in the English league system, and so their transfers are included here.

Date	Name	Moving from	Moving to	Fee
3 September 2018	David Ball	Rotherham United	Bradford City	Loan
3 September 2018	(Northern Ireland) Gareth McAuley	West Bromwich Albion	(Scotland) Rangers	Free
4 September 2018	(Northern Ireland) Brad Lyons	(Northern Ireland) Coleraine	Blackburn Rovers	Loan
5 September 2018	(Greece) Panagiotis Tachtsidis	(Greece) Olympiacos	Nottingham Forest	Free
6 September 2018	(Argentina) Claudio Yacob	West Bromwich Albion	Nottingham Forest	Free
7 September 2018	Rolando Aarons	Newcastle United	(Czech Republic) Slovan Liberec	Loan
8 September 2018	David Stockdale	Birmingham City	Southend United	Loan
14 September 2018	(Belgium) Ritchie De Laet	Aston Villa	(Australia) Melbourne City	Loan
14 September 2018	(Republic of Ireland) Wes Hoolahan	Norwich City	West Bromwich Albion	Free
16 September 2018	Sean Clare	Sheffield Wednesday	(Scotland) Heart of Midlothian	Compensation
19 September 2018	(Scotland) Ross McCormack	Aston Villa	(Australia) Central Coast Mariners	Loan
24 September 2018	Lloyd Dyer	Burton Albion	Bolton Wanderers	Free
2 October 2018	(Mali) Bakary Sako	Crystal Palace	West Bromwich Albion	Free
9 October 2018	(Republic of Ireland) Stephen Ireland	Stoke City	Bolton Wanderers	Free
3 November 2018	(Iran) Karim Ansarifard	(Greece) Olympiacos	Nottingham Forest	Free
30 November 2018	(Sweden) Paweł Cibicki	(Norway) Molde	Leeds United	Free
17 December 2018	(Romania) Adrian Popa	Reading	(Bulgaria) Ludogorets Razgrad	Loan
17 December 2018	(Spain) Samuel Sáiz	Leeds United	(Spain) Getafe	Loan
19 December 2018	(Iceland) Axel Andrésson	(Norway) Viking	Reading	Loan return
19 December 2018	(Iceland) Axel Andrésson	Reading	(Norway) Viking	Undisclosed
21 December 2018	(Croatia) Lovre Kalinić	(Belgium) Gent	Aston Villa	Undisclosed
25 December 2018	Jordan Graham	Wolverhampton Wanderers	Oxford United	Loan
27 December 2018	(Colombia) Jorge Segura	(Colombia) Independiente Medellín	Watford	Loan return
27 December 2018	(Colombia) Jorge Segura	Watford	(Mexico) Atlas	Loan
28 December 2018	Kieran Dowell	Everton	Sheffield United	Loan
28 December 2018	(Egypt) Ramadan Sobhi	Huddersfield Town	(Egypt) Al Ahly	Loan
31 December 2018	Mason Holgate	Everton	West Bromwich Albion	Loan
31 December 2018	(France) Samir Nasri	(Turkey) Antalyaspor	West Ham United	Free
31 December 2018	(Netherlands) Rajiv van La Parra	Huddersfield Town	Middlesbrough	Loan
1 January 2019	Jaden Brown	Tottenham Hotspur	Huddersfield Town	Free
1 January 2019	Brendon Daniels	Port Vale	AFC Telford United	Free
1 January 2019	Josh Ginnelly	Walsall	Preston North End	Undisclosed
1 January 2019	Matt Jarvis	Norwich City	Walsall	Loan
1 January 2019	(Spain) David Wang	(Spain) Jumilla	Wolverhampton Wanderers	Undisclosed
1 January 2019	(Spain) David Wang	Wolverhampton Wanderers	(Portugal) Sporting CP	Loan
2 January 2019	(Australia) Anthony Cáceres	(Australia) Melbourne City	Manchester City	Loan return
2 January 2019	(Australia) Anthony Cáceres	Manchester City	(Australia) Sydney	Loan
2 January 2019	(Australia) Callum Elder	Leicester City	Ipswich Town	Loan
2 January 2019	Max Power	Sunderland	Wigan Athletic	Loan return
2 January 2019	Max Power	Wigan Athletic	Sunderland	Undisclosed
2 January 2019	(United States) Christian Pulisic	(Germany) Borussia Dortmund	Chelsea	£58,000,000
2 January 2019	(United States) Christian Pulisic	Chelsea	(Germany) Borussia Dortmund	Loan
3 January 2019	(Wales) Tom Bradshaw	Millwall	Barnsley	Loan return
3 January 2019	(Wales) Tom Bradshaw	Barnsley	Millwall	Undisclosed
3 January 2019	(Denmark) Martin Braithwaite	Middlesbrough	(Spain) Leganés	Loan
3 January 2019	(Netherlands) Pelle Clement	Reading	(Netherlands) PEC Zwolle	Undisclosed
3 January 2019	(Saint Lucia) Janoi Donacien	Ipswich Town	Accrington Stanley	Loan return
3 January 2019	(Saint Lucia) Janoi Donacien	Accrington Stanley	Ipswich Town	Undisclosed
3 January 2019	(Northern Ireland) Rory Holden	Bristol City	Rochdale	Loan
3 January 2019	(Northern Ireland) Daniel Lafferty	Sheffield United	Peterborough United	Loan
3 January 2019	(Wales) Aaron Lewis	(Wales) Swansea City	Doncaster Rovers	Loan
3 January 2019	Shawn McCoulsky	Southend United	Bristol City	Loan return
3 January 2019	Shawn McCoulsky	Bristol City	Forest Green Rovers	Undisclosed
3 January 2019	Brad Potts	Barnsley	Preston North End	Undisclosed
3 January 2019	Cameron Pring	(Wales) Newport County	Bristol City	Loan return
3 January 2019	Cameron Pring	Bristol City	Cheltenham Town	Loan
3 January 2019	Jayden Stockley	Exeter City	Preston North End	£750,000
3 January 2019	(Greece) Panagiotis Tachtsidis	Nottingham Forest	(Italy) Lecce	Loan
3 January 2019	Ben White	Brighton & Hove Albion	Peterborough United	Loan
3 January 2019	Cauley Woodrow	Barnsley	Fulham	Loan return
3 January 2019	Cauley Woodrow	Fulham	Barnsley	Undisclosed
4 January 2019	(Democratic Republic of the Congo) Benik Afobe	Stoke City	Wolverhampton Wanderers	Loan return
4 January 2019	(Democratic Republic of the Congo) Benik Afobe	Wolverhampton Wanderers	Stoke City	Undisclosed
4 January 2019	Ben Barclay	Brighton & Hove Albion	Notts County	Loan
4 January 2019	Ben Brereton	Blackburn Rovers	Nottingham Forest	Loan return
4 January 2019	Ben Brereton	Nottingham Forest	Blackburn Rovers	£7,000,000
4 January 2019	(Republic of Ireland) Canice Carroll	Brentford	Swindon Town	Loan
4 January 2019	Nathaniel Clyne	Liverpool	Bournemouth	Loan
4 January 2019	(Scotland) Ben House	Reading	Swindon Town	Loan
4 January 2019	Will Keane	Hull City	Ipswich Town	Loan
4 January 2019	Ryan Leonard	Millwall	Sheffield United	Loan return
4 January 2019	Ryan Leonard	Sheffield United	Millwall	Undisclosed
4 January 2019	Nathan McGinley	Forest Green Rovers	Middlesbrough	Loan return
4 January 2019	Nathan McGinley	Middlesbrough	Forest Green Rovers	Undisclosed
4 January 2019	(Scotland) Paul McKay	(Wales) Cardiff City	Morecambe	Loan
4 January 2019	Vashon Neufville	West Ham United	(Wales) Newport County	Loan
4 January 2019	(Northern Ireland) Oliver Norwood	Sheffield United	Brighton & Hove Albion	Loan return
4 January 2019	(Northern Ireland) Oliver Norwood	Brighton & Hove Albion	Sheffield United	Undisclosed
4 January 2019	Alex Pearce	Derby County	Millwall	Loan
4 January 2019	Jason Puncheon	Crystal Palace	Huddersfield Town	Loan
4 January 2019	Aaron Ramsdale	Bournemouth	AFC Wimbledon	Loan
4 January 2019	(Netherlands) Darren Sidoel	Reading	(Belgium) Roeselare	Loan
4 January 2019	Dominic Solanke	Liverpool	Bournemouth	£19,000,000
4 January 2019	Byron Webster	Millwall	Scunthorpe United	Free
4 January 2019	(Wales) Jonny Williams	Crystal Palace	Charlton Athletic	Undisclosed
4 January 2019	Ryan Woods	Stoke City	Brentford	Loan return
4 January 2019	Ryan Woods	Brentford	Stoke City	Undisclosed
5 January 2019	(Scotland) Oliver Burke	West Bromwich Albion	(Scotland) Celtic	Loan
5 January 2019	(Scotland) Ross McCormack	(Australia) Central Coast Mariners	Aston Villa	Loan return
5 January 2019	(Scotland) Ross McCormack	Aston Villa	(Scotland) Motherwell	Loan
5 January 2019	(Guinea) Idrissa Sylla	Queens Park Rangers	(Belgium) Zulte Waregem	Undisclosed
6 January 2019	(Northern Ireland) Steven Davis	Southampton	(Scotland) Rangers	Loan
6 January 2019	Jermain Defoe	Bournemouth	(Scotland) Rangers	Loan
6 January 2019	(Spain) Brahim Díaz	Manchester City	(Spain) Real Madrid	£15,500,000
7 January 2019	(United States) Gboly Ariyibi	Nottingham Forest	(Scotland) Motherwell	Loan
7 January 2019	George Cox	Brighton & Hove Albion	Northampton Town	Loan
7 January 2019	(Wales) David Edwards	Reading	Shrewsbury Town	Free
7 January 2019	Ovie Ejaria	(Scotland) Rangers	Liverpool	Loan return
7 January 2019	Ovie Ejaria	Liverpool	Reading	Loan
7 January 2019	Harvey Gilmour	Tranmere Rovers	Sheffield United	Loan return
7 January 2019	Harvey Gilmour	Sheffield United	Tranmere Rovers	Undisclosed
7 January 2019	Kortney Hause	Wolverhampton Wanderers	Aston Villa	Loan
7 January 2019	(Spain) Vicente Iborra	Leicester City	(Spain) Villarreal	Undisclosed
7 January 2019	Gary Madine	(Wales) Cardiff City	Sheffield United	Loan
7 January 2019	(Republic of Ireland) Conor Shaughnessy	Leeds United	(Scotland) Heart of Midlothian	Loan
7 January 2019	George Thorne	Derby County	Luton Town	Loan
8 January 2019	(Nigeria) Bright Enobakhare	(Scotland) Kilmarnock	Wolverhampton Wanderers	Loan return
8 January 2019	(Nigeria) Bright Enobakhare	Wolverhampton Wanderers	Coventry City	Loan
8 January 2019	(Wales) Chris Maxwell	Preston North End	Charlton Athletic	Loan
8 January 2019	(Republic of Ireland) Paudie O'Connor	Blackpool	Leeds United	Loan return
8 January 2019	(Republic of Ireland) Paudie O'Connor	Leeds United	Bradford City	Loan
8 January 2019	(Italy) Stefano Okaka	Watford	(Italy) Udinese	Loan
8 January 2019	(Germany) Collin Quaner	Huddersfield Town	Ipswich Town	Loan
8 January 2019	(Norway) Alexander Sørloth	Crystal Palace	(Belgium) Gent	Loan
8 January 2019	Lee Tomlin	(Wales) Cardiff City	Peterborough United	Loan
9 January 2019	Lewis Baker	Leeds United	Chelsea	Loan return
9 January 2019	Lewis Baker	Chelsea	Reading	Loan
9 January 2019	(Jamaica) Simon Dawkins	Unattached	Ipswich Town	Free
9 January 2019	(Republic of Ireland) Jimmy Dunne	(Scotland) Heart of Midlothian	Burnley	Loan return
9 January 2019	(Republic of Ireland) Jimmy Dunne	Burnley	Sunderland	Loan
9 January 2019	Kasey Palmer	Blackburn Rovers	Chelsea	Loan return
9 January 2019	Kasey Palmer	Chelsea	Bristol City	Loan
9 January 2019	Connor Ripley	Accrington Stanley	Middlesbrough	Loan return
9 January 2019	Connor Ripley	Middlesbrough	Preston North End	Undisclosed
9 January 2019	Connor Simpson	Hyde United	Preston North End	Loan return
9 January 2019	Connor Simpson	Preston North End	Carlisle United	Loan
10 January 2019	(Mali) Fousseni Diabaté	Leicester City	(Turkey) Sivasspor	Loan
10 January 2019	(Switzerland) Seny Dieng	Queen's Park Rangers	(Scotland) Dundee	Loan
10 January 2019	Liam Gibson	Newcastle United	Accrington Stanley	Loan
10 January 2019	Ali Koiki	Burnley	Swindon Town	Loan
10 January 2019	(Republic of Ireland) Anthony Pilkington	(Wales) Cardiff City	Wigan Athletic	Free
10 January 2019	Ben Purrington	AFC Wimbledon	Rotherham United	Loan return
10 January 2019	Ben Purrington	Rotherham United	Charlton Athletic	Loan
10 January 2019	Ryan Schofield	Huddersfield Town	Notts County	Loan
10 January 2019	Jordan Smith	Nottingham Forest	Mansfield Town	Loan
10 January 2019	(Netherlands) Marvin Zeegelaar	Watford	(Italy) Udinese	Loan
11 January 2019	Luke Armstrong	Gateshead	Middlesbrough	Loan return
11 January 2019	Luke Armstrong	Middlesbrough	Accrington Stanley	Loan
11 January 2019	Josh Clarke	Brentford	Burton Albion	Loan
11 January 2019	(Wales) James Collins	Unattached	Ipswich Town	Free
11 January 2019	Matt Crooks	Northampton Town	Rotherham United	Undisclosed
11 January 2019	(Romania) Alex Dobre	Bournemouth	Yeovil Town	Loan
11 January 2019	Ethan Ebanks-Landell	Wolverhampton Wanderers	Rochdale	Loan
11 January 2019	(Spain) Cesc Fàbregas	Chelsea	(France) AS Monaco	Undisclosed
11 January 2019	(Italy) Manolo Gabbiadini	Southampton	(Italy) Sampdoria	Undisclosed
11 January 2019	Josh Grant	Chelsea	Yeovil Town	Loan
11 January 2019	(Scotland) Ethan Hamilton	Manchester United	Rochdale	Loan
11 January 2019	Rushian Hepburn-Murphy	Aston Villa	Cambridge United	Loan
11 January 2019	Nya Kirby	Crystal Palace	Blackpool	Loan
11 January 2019	(Northern Ireland) Brad Lyons	Blackburn Rovers	(Northern Ireland) Coleraine	Loan return
11 January 2019	(Northern Ireland) Brad Lyons	(Northern Ireland) Coleraine	Blackburn Rovers	Undisclosed
11 January 2019	Moses Makasi	West Ham United	Stevenage	Loan
14 January 2019	Nicky Ajose	Charlton Athletic	Mansfield Town	Loan
14 January 2019	Oliver Byrne	Blackburn Rovers	Stevenage	Loan
14 January 2019	Adam Crookes	Lincoln City	Nottingham Forest	Loan return
14 January 2019	Adam Crookes	Nottingham Forest	Port Vale	Loan
14 January 2019	Jorge Grant	Luton Town	Nottingham Forest	Loan return
14 January 2019	Jorge Grant	Nottingham Forest	Mansfield Town	Loan
14 January 2019	(Republic of Ireland) Alan Judge	Brentford	Ipswich Town	Undisclosed
14 January 2019	Lewis Ward	Northampton Town	Reading	Loan return
14 January 2019	Lewis Ward	Reading	Forest Green Rovers	Loan
14 January 2019	Kane Wilson	Walsall	West Bromwich Albion	Loan return
14 January 2019	Kane Wilson	West Bromwich Albion	Exeter City	Loan
15 January 2019	Dior Angus	Port Vale	Barrow	Loan
15 January 2019	(Netherlands) Ryan Babel	(Turkey) Beşiktaş	Fulham	Loan
15 January 2019	Sam Hart	Rochdale	Blackburn Rovers	Loan return
15 January 2019	Sam Hart	Blackburn Rovers	Southend United	Loan
15 January 2019	(Northern Ireland) Brad Lyons	Blackburn Rovers	(Scotland) St. Mirren	Loan
15 January 2019	Dion Pereira	Watford	(United States) Atlanta United	Undisclosed
16 January 2019	Ben Marshall	Norwich City	Millwall	Loan
16 January 2019	Steve Seddon	Stevenage	Birmingham City	Loan return
16 January 2019	Steve Seddon	Birmingham City	AFC Wimbledon	Loan
17 January 2019	James Brown	Millwall	Lincoln City	Loan
17 January 2019	(Spain) Kiko Casilla	(Spain) Real Madrid	Leeds United	Free
17 January 2019	Danny Rowe	Ipswich Town	Lincoln City	Loan
17 January 2019	(Belgium) Mousa Dembélé	Tottenham Hotspur	(China) Guangzhou R&F	£11,000,000
18 January 2019	(Tunisia) Yohan Benalouane	Leicester City	Nottingham Forest	Undisclosed
18 January 2019	Jaden Brown	Huddersfield Town	Exeter City	Loan
18 January 2019	Reece Cole	Maidenhead United	Brentford	Loan return
18 January 2019	Reece Cole	Brentford	Macclesfield Town	Loan
18 January 2019	(Saint Lucia) Janoi Donacien	Ipswich Town	Accrington Stanley	Loan
18 January 2019	Joe Grayson	Blackburn Rovers	Grimsby Town	Loan
18 January 2019	Remi Matthews	Bolton Wanderers	Norwich City	Loan return
18 January 2019	Remi Matthews	Norwich City	Bolton Wanderers	Free
18 January 2019	(Scotland) Kyle McAllister	Derby County	(Scotland) St. Mirren	Loan
18 January 2019	(Sweden) Kerim Mrabti	(Sweden) Djurgårdens IF	Birmingham City	Free
18 January 2019	(Senegal) Oumar Niasse	Everton	(Wales) Cardiff City	Loan
18 January 2019	(Wales) Regan Poole	Manchester United	(Wales) Newport County	Loan
18 January 2019	Sam Smith	Oxford United	Reading	Loan return
18 January 2019	Sam Smith	Reading	Shrewsbury Town	Loan
18 January 2019	(Scotland) Greg Stewart	(Scotland) Kilmarnock	Birmingham City	Loan return
18 January 2019	(Scotland) Greg Stewart	Birmingham City	(Scotland) Aberdeen	Loan
18 January 2019	Randell Williams	Wycombe Wanderers	Watford	Loan return
18 January 2019	Randell Williams	Watford	Exeter City	Free
18 January 2019	Matt Worthington	Forest Green Rovers	Bournemouth	Loan return
18 January 2019	Matt Worthington	Bournemouth	Yeovil Town	Free
19 January 2019	(Argentina) Emiliano Sala	(France) Nantes	(Wales) Cardiff City	Undisclosed
21 January 2019	Ashley Cole	(United States) LA Galaxy	Derby County	Free
21 January 2019	Joe Powell	West Ham United	Northampton Town	Loan
21 January 2019	Dan Scarr	Birmingham City	Walsall	Undisclosed
21 January 2019	(Denmark) Elias Sørensen	Newcastle United	Blackpool	Loan
22 January 2019	(Wales) Chris Mepham	Brentford	Bournemouth	Undisclosed
22 January 2019	(Portugal) Nélson Oliveira	Norwich City	Reading	Loan
22 January 2019	Ben Pringle	Grimsby Town	Preston North End	Loan return
22 January 2019	Ben Pringle	Preston North End	Tranmere Rovers	Loan
22 January 2019	Marc Pugh	Bournemouth	Hull City	Loan
22 January 2019	(Netherlands) Wesley Hoedt	Southampton	(Spain) Celta Vigo	Loan
23 January 2019	(Wales) Mark Harris	(Wales) Newport County	(Wales) Cardiff City	Loan return
23 January 2019	(Wales) Mark Harris	(Wales) Cardiff City	Port Vale	Loan
23 January 2019	(Argentina) Gonzalo Higuaín	(Italy) Juventus	Chelsea	Loan
23 January 2019	(Argentina) Emiliano Martínez	Arsenal	Reading	Loan
23 January 2019	(Republic of Ireland) Joe Rafferty	Rochdale	Preston North End	Undisclosed
23 January 2019	Jordan Roberts	Ipswich Town	Lincoln City	Loan
23 January 2019	Scott Wharton	Lincoln City	Blackburn Rovers	Loan return
23 January 2019	Scott Wharton	Blackburn Rovers	Bury	Loan
23 January 2019	Calum Woods	Preston North End	Bradford City	Free
24 January 2019	Luke Bolton	Manchester City	Wycombe Wanderers	Loan
24 January 2019	Paul Downing	Blackburn Rovers	Doncaster Rovers	Loan
24 January 2019	(Nigeria) John Obi Mikel	(China) Tianjin TEDA	Middlesbrough	Free
25 January 2019	(Mexico) Uriel Antuna	(Netherlands) Groningen	Manchester City	Loan return
25 January 2019	(Mexico) Uriel Antuna	Manchester City	(United States) LA Galaxy	Loan
25 January 2019	(Slovenia) Timi Elšnik	Mansfield Town	Derby County	Loan return
25 January 2019	(Slovenia) Timi Elšnik	Derby County	Northampton Town	Loan
25 January 2019	Jordan Hallam	Chesterfield	Sheffield United	Loan return
25 January 2019	Jordan Hallam	Sheffield United	Scunthorpe United	Loan
25 January 2019	(United States) Matt Miazga	(France) Nantes	Chelsea	Loan return
25 January 2019	(United States) Matt Miazga	Chelsea	Reading	Loan
25 January 2019	(Colombia) Marlos Moreno	(Brazil) Flamengo	Manchester City	Loan return
25 January 2019	(Colombia) Marlos Moreno	Manchester City	(Mexico) Santos Laguna	Loan
25 January 2019	(Nigeria) Victor Moses	Chelsea	(Turkey) Fenerbahçe	Loan
25 January 2019	(Northern Ireland) Paul Smyth	Queens Park Rangers	Accrington Stanley	Loan
25 January 2019	David Wheeler	Portsmouth	Queens Park Rangers	Loan return
25 January 2019	David Wheeler	Queens Park Rangers	Milton Keynes Dons	Loan
26 January 2019	(Denmark) Anders Dreyer	Brighton & Hove Albion	(Scotland) St. Mirren	Loan
26 January 2019	Josh Maja	Sunderland	(France) Bordeaux	Undisclosed
26 January 2019	(Portugal) Cédric Soares	Southampton	(Italy) Internazionale	Loan
26 January 2019	Jamie Sterry	Newcastle United	Crewe Alexandra	Loan
27 January 2019	(Mali) Bakary Sako	West Bromwich Albion	Crystal Palace	Free
28 January 2019	Omar Bogle	Birmingham City	(Wales) Cardiff City	Loan return
28 January 2019	Omar Bogle	(Wales) Cardiff City	Portsmouth	Loan
28 January 2019	Harry Chapman	Middlesbrough	Blackburn Rovers	Undisclosed
28 January 2019	(Scotland) Alex Iacovitti	Nottingham Forest	Oldham Athletic	Loan
28 January 2019	(Spain) Álvaro Morata	Chelsea	(Spain) Atlético Madrid	Loan
28 January 2019	(Norway) Mathias Normann	Brighton & Hove Albion	(Russia) Rostov	Undisclosed
29 January 2019	Danny Batth	Middlesbrough	Wolverhampton Wanderers	Loan return
29 January 2019	Danny Batth	Wolverhampton Wanderers	Stoke City	£3,000,000
29 January 2019	Akin Famewo	Grimsby Town	Luton Town	Loan return
29 January 2019	Akin Famewo	Luton Town	Norwich City	Undisclosed
29 January 2019	(Scotland) Danny Fox	Nottingham Forest	Wigan Athletic	Undisclosed
29 January 2019	(Portugal) Tiago Ilori	Reading	(Portugal) Sporting CP	Undisclosed
29 January 2019	Grant Leadbitter	Middlesbrough	Sunderland	Free
29 January 2019	Sid Nelson	Swindon Town	Millwall	Loan return
29 January 2019	Sid Nelson	Millwall	Tranmere Rovers	Loan
29 January 2019	Callum O'Hare	Aston Villa	Carlisle United	Loan
29 January 2019	Gabriel Osho	Reading	Bristol Rovers	Loan
29 January 2019	Ryan Seager	(Netherlands) Telstar	Southampton	Loan return
29 January 2019	Ryan Seager	Southampton	Yeovil Town	Free
29 January 2019	(Republic of Ireland) Ryan Sweeney	Mansfield Town	Stoke City	Loan return
29 January 2019	(Republic of Ireland) Ryan Sweeney	Stoke City	Mansfield Town	Free
29 January 2019	Nathan Thomas	Notts County	Sheffield United	Loan return
29 January 2019	Nathan Thomas	Sheffield United	Carlisle United	Loan
30 January 2019	Leon Clarke	Sheffield United	Wigan Athletic	Loan
30 January 2019	Karlan Grant	Charlton Athletic	Huddersfield Town	Undisclosed
30 January 2019	(Wales) Rabbi Matondo	Manchester City	(Germany) Schalke 04	£9,600,000
30 January 2019	(France) Georges-Kévin Nkoudou	Tottenham Hotspur	(France) Monaco	Loan
30 January 2019	Aramide Oteh	Queens Park Rangers	Walsall	Loan
30 January 2019	Rekeil Pyke	(Wales) Wrexham	Huddersfield Town	Loan return
30 January 2019	Rekeil Pyke	Huddersfield Town	Rochdale	Loan
30 January 2019	(Mali) Hadi Sacko	(Spain) Las Palmas	Leeds United	Loan return
30 January 2019	(Mali) Hadi Sacko	Leeds United	(Turkey) MKE Ankaragücü	Loan
30 January 2019	(Scotland) Harry Souttar	Stoke City	Fleetwood Town	Loan
30 January 2019	Ben Stevenson	(Spain) Jumilla	Wolverhampton Wanderers	Loan return
30 January 2019	Ben Stevenson	Wolverhampton Wanderers	Colchester United	Free
30 January 2019	(Spain) Denis Suárez	(Spain) Barcelona	Arsenal	Loan
30 January 2019	Ro-Shaun Williams	Manchester United	Shrewsbury Town	Free
31 January 2019	(Paraguay) Miguel Almirón	(United States) Atlanta United	Newcastle United	£20,000,000
31 January 2019	(Curaçao) Leandro Bacuna	Reading	(Wales) Cardiff City	Undisclosed
31 January 2019	Peter Crouch	Stoke City	Burnley	Undisclosed
31 January 2019	Toby Edser	Nottingham Forest	Port Vale	Loan
31 January 2019	Kyle Howkins	West Bromwich Albion	Port Vale	Loan
31 January 2019	(Scotland) Marc McNulty	Reading	(Scotland) Hibernian	Loan
31 January 2019	(Republic of Ireland) David Meyler	Reading	Coventry City	Loan
31 January 2019	Liam Ridgewell	(United States) Portland Timbers	Hull City	Free
31 January 2019	(Portugal) Adrien Silva	Leicester City	(France) Monaco	Loan
31 January 2019	(Belgium) Youri Tielemans	(France) Monaco	Leicester City	Loan
31 January 2019	Daniel Trickett-Smith	Leek Town	Port Vale	Undisclosed
31 January 2019	Daniel Trickett-Smith	Port Vale	Leek Town	Loan
31 January 2019	(Wales) Sam Vokes	Burnley	Stoke City	Undisclosed
31 January 2019	Callum Whelan	Manchester United	Port Vale	Loan
