= List of Maltese football champions =

List of Maltese football/soccer champions
- Founded: 1909
- Country: Malta
- Confederation: UEFA
- Number of clubs: 12
- Current champions: Floriana (27th title) (2025–26 season)
- Most championships: Floriana (27 titles)
- Current: 2025–26 Maltese Premier League

The Maltese football champions are the winners of the primary football competition in Malta, the Premier League. The league is contested on a round-robin system and the championship is awarded to the highest ranked team at the end of the season. Originally known as the First Division, it started with a disparate number of participating teams. Nowadays, it is contested by 14 teams. With a hiatus during the Second World War, the competition has been ever-present since its inception.

Floriana are the current champions and the most successful club with 27 titles.

== Champions ==
Key
Club (X)	Club name and number of times they had won the title at that point (if more than one)
†	Champions also won the FA Trophy that season, completing a domestic double

=== First Division (1909–80) ===
Season	Winner	Runner-up	Third place	Top scorer(s)	Goals
1909–10	Floriana	Sliema Wanderers	St. Joseph's United	(Malta) Salvu Samuele (Floriana)	4
1910–11	League championship was not held				
1911–12	Floriana (2)	Ħamrun Spartans	St. George's	(Note: Unknown top-scorer due to no accurate records kept of the matches played)	
1912–13	Floriana (3)	Ħamrun Spartans	Sliema Wanderers		
1913–14	Ħamrun Spartans	St. George's	Valletta United		
1914–15	Valletta United	Ħamrun Spartans	Sliema Wanderers		
1915–16	League championship was not held				
1916–17	St. George's	Sliema Wanderers	Ħamrun Spartans		
1917–18	Ħamrun Spartans (2)	St. George's	Sliema Wanderers		
1918–19	King's Own Malta Regiment	Ħamrun United	Royal Army Service Corps		
1919–20	Sliema Wanderers	Ħamrun Spartans	Valletta United		
1920–21	Floriana (4)	Marsa United	Ħamrun Spartans		
1921–22	Floriana (5)	Sliema Wanderers	Malta Police		
1922–23	Sliema Wanderers (2)	Floriana	Sliema Rangers		
1923–24	Sliema Wanderers (3)	Vittoriosa Rovers	Valletta United		
1924–25	Floriana (6)	Sliema Wanderers	Valletta United		
1925–26	Sliema Wanderers (4)	Floriana	Valletta United		
1926–27	Floriana (7)	Sliema Wanderers	St. George's		
1927–28	Floriana (8)	Valletta United	St. George's		
1928–29	Floriana (9)	Sliema Wanderers	Valletta United	(Malta) P. Friggieri (Floriana)	4
1929–30	Sliema Wanderers (5)	St. George's	Valletta United		
1930–31	Floriana (10)	Sliema Wanderers	Valletta United	(Malta) C. Cauchi (Floriana)	4
1931–32	Valletta United (2)	Sliema Wanderers	Sliema Hotspurs		
1932–33	Sliema Wanderers (6)	Hibernians	Sliema Rangers		
1933–34	Sliema Wanderers (7)	Hibernians		(Malta) A. Brincat (Sliema Wanderers)	2
1934–35	Floriana (11)	Sliema Wanderers	Hibernians	(Malta) Tony Nicholl (Sliema Wanderers)	11
1935–36	Sliema Wanderers (8)^{†}	Floriana	Hibernians	(Austria) Anton Mayerhoffer (Floriana)	3
1936–37	Floriana (12)	Hibernians	Sliema Wanderers	(England) George Bond (Floriana)	4
1937–38	Sliema Wanderers (9)	Floriana	Valletta	(Malta) Tony Nicholl (Sliema Wanderers) (Malta) C. Cauchi (Floriana)	5
1938–39	Sliema Wanderers (10)	Melita	St. George's	(Malta) Tony Nicholl (Sliema Wanderers)	8
1939–40	Sliema Wanderers (11)^{†}	St. George's	Melita	(Malta) Tony Nicholl (Sliema Wanderers)	18
1940–41 to 1943–44	League suspended owing to the Second World War				
1944–45	Valletta (3)	Sliema Athletics	Floriana	(Malta) Tony Nicholl (Sliema Athletics)	6
1945–46	Valletta (4)	Sliema Wanderers	Floriana		
1946–47	Ħamrun Spartans (3)	Valletta	Floriana	(Malta) Maurice Decesare (Melita) (Malta) C. Galea (Floriana)	11
1947–48	Valletta (5)	Ħamrun Spartans	Sliema Wanderers	(Malta) Freddie Landolina (Ħamrun Spartans)	16
1948–49	Sliema Wanderers (12)	Ħamrun Spartans	Valletta	(Malta) Salvinu Schembri (Valletta) (Malta) Tony Nicholl (Sliema Wanderers)	11
1949–50	Floriana (13)^{†}	Ħamrun Spartans	Sliema Wanderers	(Malta) Pace (Valletta)	16
1950–51	Floriana (14)	Hibernians	Valletta	(Malta) Pullu Demanuele (Valletta)	14
1951–52	Floriana (15)	Ħamrun Spartans	Sliema Wanderers	(Malta) Lolly Borg (Floriana)	17
1952–53	Floriana (16)^{†}	Birkirkara	Valletta	(Malta) Pace (Valletta)	9
1953–54	Sliema Wanderers (13)	Floriana	Ħamrun Spartans	(Malta) Tony Nicholl (Sliema Wanderers)	12
1954–55	Floriana (17)^{†}	Sliema Wanderers	Ħamrun Spartans	(Malta) Lolly Borg (Floriana) (Malta) Tony Cauchi (Floriana)	13
1955–56	Sliema Wanderers (14)^{†}	Floriana	Ħamrun Spartans	(Malta) Sammy Nicholl (Sliema Wanderers)	15
1956–57	Sliema Wanderers (15)	Valletta	Floriana	(Malta) Sammy Nicholl (Sliema Wanderers)	14
1957–58	Floriana (18)^{†}	Sliema Wanderers	Ħamrun Spartans	(Malta) Pullu Demanuele (Floriana)	14
1958–59	Valletta (6)	Sliema Wanderers	Ħamrun Spartans	(Malta) A. Cassar (Ħamrun Spartans)	11
1959–60	Valletta (7)^{†}	Hibernians	Floriana	(Malta) F. Zammit (Valletta) (Malta) M. Azzopardi (Valletta)	12
1960–61	Hibernians	Valletta	Sliema Wanderers	(Malta) Tony Cauchi (Floriana)	12
1961–62	Floriana (19)	Valletta	Sliema Wanderers	(Malta) Tony Cauchi (Floriana)	17
1962–63	Valletta (8)	Hibernians	Sliema Wanderers	(Malta) M. Azzopardi (Valletta)	20
1963–64	Sliema Wanderers (16)	Valletta	Hibernians	(Malta) A. Borg (Valletta)	11
1964–65	Sliema Wanderers (17)^{†}	Valletta	Hibernians	(Malta) Joe Cini (Sliema Wanderers)	12
1965–66	Sliema Wanderers (18)	Floriana	Hibernians	(Malta) John Bonnett (Sliema Wanderers) (Malta) Ronnie Cocks (Sliema Wanderers)	6
1966–67	Hibernians (2)	Sliema Wanderers	Floriana	(Malta) A. Delia (Hibernians)	8
1967–68	Floriana (20)	Sliema Wanderers	Hibernians	(Malta) Joe Cini (Sliema Wanderers)	10
1968–69	Hibernians (3)	Valletta	Floriana	(Malta) C. Cassar (Hibernians)	9
1969–70	Floriana (21)	Sliema Wanderers	Hibernians	(Malta) Joe Cini (Sliema Wanderers) (Malta) Ronnie Cocks (Sliema Wanderers)	7
1970–71	Sliema Wanderers (19)	Marsa	Gżira United	(Malta) Raymond Xuereb (Floriana)	5
1971–72	Sliema Wanderers (20)	Floriana	Valletta	(Malta) T. Giglio (Valletta)	9
1972–73	Floriana (22)	Sliema Wanderers	Ħamrun Spartans	(Malta) C. Borg (Ħamrun Spartans)	10
1973–74	Valletta (9)	Hibernians	Floriana	(Malta) T. Camilleri (Sliema Wanderers)	9
1974–75	Floriana (23)	Sliema Wanderers	St. George's	(Malta) Raymond Xuereb (Floriana)	17
1975–76	Sliema Wanderers (21)	Floriana	Hibernians	(Malta) Richard Aquilina (Sliema Wanderers)	9
1976–77	Floriana (24)	Sliema Wanderers	Valletta	(Malta) Raymond Xuereb (Floriana)	16
1977–78	Valletta (10)^{†}	Hibernians	Sliema Wanderers	(Malta) Leonard Farrugia (Valletta)	16
1978–79	Hibernians (4)	Valletta	Sliema Wanderers	(Malta) C. Brincat (Marsa)	11
1979–80	Valletta (11)	Hibernians	Floriana	(Malta) Emanuel Fabri (Sliema Wanderers) (Malta) Leonard Farrugia (Valletta) (Malta) F. Cristiano (Valletta)	15

=== Premier League (1980–present) ===
Season	Winner	Runner-up	Third place	Top scorer(s)	Goals
1980–81	Hibernians (5)	Sliema Wanderers	Ħamrun Spartans	(Malta) Ernest Spiteri-Gonzi (Hibernians)	13
1981–82	Hibernians (6)^{†}	Sliema Wanderers	Żurrieq	(Malta) Ernest Spiteri-Gonzi (Hibernians)	12
1982–83	Ħamrun Spartans (4)^{†}	Valletta	Rabat Ajax	(Malta) Leo Refalo (Ħamrun Spartans)	7
1983–84	Valletta (12)	Rabat Ajax	Ħamrun Spartans	(Bulgaria) Georgi Ivanov (Ħamrun Spartans) (Malta) Charles Muscat (Żurrieq)	7
1984–85	Rabat Ajax	Ħamrun Spartans	Sliema Wanderers	(Malta) Leonard Farrugia (Valletta)	9
1985–86	Rabat Ajax (2)^{†}	Hibernians	Ħamrun Spartans	(Italy) Gianluca De Ponti (Żurrieq)	8
1986–87	Ħamrun Spartans (5)^{†}	Valletta	Żurrieq	(Malta) Carmel Busuttil (Rabat Ajax)	10
1987–88	Ħamrun Spartans (6)^{†}	Sliema Wanderers	Żurrieq	(England) Barry Gallagher (Ħamrun Spartans)	7
1988–89	Sliema Wanderers (22)	Valletta	Ħamrun Spartans	(Malta) Joe Zarb (Valletta)	11
1989–90	Valletta (13)	Sliema Wanderers	Hibernians	(Malta) Joe Zarb (Valletta)	17
1990–91	Ħamrun Spartans (7)	Valletta	Floriana	(Malta) Joe Zarb (Valletta)	12
1991–92	Valletta (14)	Floriana	Sliema Wanderers	(Malta) Stefan Sultana (Ħamrun Spartans)	22
1992–93	Floriana (25)^{†}	Ħamrun Spartans	Valletta	(Denmark) Carl Zachhau (Hibernians)	22
1993–94	Hibernians (7)	Floriana	Valletta	(Denmark) Carl Zachhau (Hibernians) (Malta) Joe Zarb (Valletta)	17
1994–95	Hibernians (8)	Sliema Wanderers	Valletta	(England) Carl Saunders (Sliema Wanderers)	18
1995–96	Sliema Wanderers (23)	Valletta	Floriana	(Malta) Aldrin Muscat (Sliema Wanderers)	18
1996–97	Valletta (15)^{†}	Birkirkara	Floriana	(Serbia and Montenegro) Danilo Dončić (Valletta)	32
1997–98	Valletta (16)	Birkirkara	Sliema Wanderers	(Malta) Joe Brincat (Birkirkara/Floriana)	19
1998–99	Valletta (17)^{†}	Birkirkara	Sliema Wanderers	(Malta) Gilbert Agius (Valletta)	20
1999–2000	Birkirkara	Valletta	Floriana	(Malta) Michael Mifsud (Sliema Wanderers)	21
2000–01	Valletta (18)^{†}	Sliema Wanderers	Birkirkara	(Malta) Michael Mifsud (Sliema Wanderers)	30
2001–02	Hibernians (9)	Sliema Wanderers	Birkirkara	(Serbia and Montenegro) Danilo Dončić (Sliema Wanderers)	32
2002–03	Sliema Wanderers (24)	Birkirkara	Valletta	(Malta) Adrian Mifsud (Hibernians (Serbia and Montenegro) Danilo Dončić (Sliema Wanderers) (Malta) Michael Galea (Birkirkara)	18
2003–04	Sliema Wanderers (25)^{†}	Birkirkara	Hibernians	(Serbia and Montenegro) Danilo Dončić (Sliema Wanderers)	19
2004–05	Sliema Wanderers (26)	Birkirkara	Hibernians	(Malta) Andrew Cohen (Hibernians)	21
2005–06	Birkirkara (2)	Sliema Wanderers	Marsaxlokk	(Malta) Michael Galea (Birkirkara)	19
2006–07	Marsaxlokk	Sliema Wanderers	Birkirkara	(Malta) Daniel Bogdanović (Marsaxlokk)	31
2007–08	Valletta (19)	Marsaxlokk	Birkirkara	(Argentina) Omar Sebastián Monesterolo (Valletta)	19
2008–09	Hibernians (10)	Valletta	Birkirkara	(Malta) Terence Scerri (Hibernians)	26
2009–10	Birkirkara (3)	Valletta	Sliema Wanderers	(Brazil) Camilo Sanvezzo (Qormi)	24
2010–11	Valletta (20)	Floriana	Birkirkara	(Nigeria) Alfred Effiong (Marsaxlokk) (Note: Alfred Effiong was born in Nigeria, but since March 2015 has a Maltese passport and has represented Malta in international football)	17
2011–12	Valletta (21)	Hibernians	Birkirkara	(Nigeria) Obinna Obiefule (Marsaxlokk/Mosta)	34
2012–13	Birkirkara (4)	Hibernians	Valletta	(Spain) Jose Luis Negrin (Melita/Rabat Ajax)	22
2013–14	Valletta (22)^{†}	Birkirkara	Hibernians	(Brazil) Jhonnattann (Birkirkara) (Brazil) Edison Luiz dos Santos (Hibernians)	21
2014–15	Hibernians (11)	Valletta	Birkirkara	(Brazil) Jorginho (Hibernians) (Brazil) Edison Luiz dos Santos (Hibernians)	25
2015–16	Valletta (23)	Hibernians	Birkirkara	(Italy) Mario Fontanella (Floriana)	20
2016–17	Hibernians (12)	Balzan	Birkirkara	(Montenegro) Bojan Kaljević (Balzan)	23
2017–18	Valletta (24)^{†}	Balzan	Gżira United	(Senegal) Amadou Samb (Gżira United)	21
2018–19	Valletta (25)	Hibernians	Gżira United	(Brazil) Taylon Correa (Hibernians)	19
2019–20	Floriana (26)	Valletta	Hibernians	(Albania) Kristian Keqi (Floriana)	14
2020–21	Ħamrun Spartans (8)	Hibernians	Gżira United	(Colombia) Kevin Rosero (St. Lucia)	17
2021–22	Hibernians (13)	Floriana	Ħamrun Spartans	(Brazil) Maxuell Maia (Gżira United)	17
2022–23	Ħamrun Spartans (9)	Birkirkara	Gżira United	(Brazil) Jefferson Assis (Gżira United)	20
2023–24	Hamrun Spartans (10)	Floriana	Sliema Wanderers	(Malta) Luke Montebello (Hamrun Spartans)	21
2024–25	Hamrun Spartans (11)	Birkirkara	Floriana	(Brazil) Maxuell Samurai Maia (Birkirkara)	22
2025–26	Floriana (27)	Marsaxlokk	Hamrun Spartans	(Malta) Joseph Mbong (Hamrun Spartans)	14

== Total titles won ==
Titles won by club (%)
1. Sliema Wanderers: 26 (23.6%)
2. Floriana: 26 (23.6%)
3. Valletta: 25 (22.7%)
4. Hibernians: 13 (11.8%)
5. Ħamrun Spartans: 11 (10.0%)
6. Birkirkara: 4 (3.64%)
7. Other clubs: 5 (4.55%)

As of 16 May 2026

- Clubs participating in the 2025–26 Maltese Premier League are denoted in **bold** type
- Clubs no longer active are denoted in italics

Club	Winners	Runners-up
**Floriana**	27	14
**Sliema Wanderers**	26	31
**Valletta**	25	17
**Hibernians**	13	14
**Ħamrun Spartans**	11	11
**Birkirkara**	4	10
Rabat Ajax	2	1
St. George's	1	4
**Marsaxlokk**	1	2
The King's Own Malta Regiment	1	0
