= Gejtu Psaila =

Maltese footballer (1893–1968)

Personal information
- Date of birth: 1893
- Place of birth: Ħamrun, Crown Colony of Malta
- Date of death: 14 March 1968 (aged 74–75)
- Position: Defender

Senior career*
Years	Team	Apps	(Gls)
1910–1918	Ħamrun Spartans		
1918–1919	KOMRM		
1920–1921	Marsa United		
1921–1922	Malta Police		
1922–1925	Floriana		
- * Club domestic league appearances and goals

Gejtu Psaila (1893 – 14 March 1968), also known as Il-Haċċa, was a Maltese footballer who played as a defender. He was the first ever professional footballer from Malta, and was considered one of the best Maltese footballers of all time.

== Club career ==
Psaila began his career at Ħamrun Spartans in 1910, where he helped them win two league titles. In 1918, he joined a team representing The King's Own Malta Regiment, who he had previously played for in a charity match for in 1916. Psaila helped the team win the 1918–19 Maltese First Division, in the team's only league season. He spent the 1920–21 season at newly-formed Marsa United, before joining the Malta Police football team, which he helped create.

At Malta Police, he was considered one of the team's star players for the 1921–22 season, and was the team's captain. In 1922, he signed for Floriana, where he became Malta's first ever professional footballer. Psaila spent three seasons at Floriana, where he helped them win the Cassar Cup in 1923 and the Maltese First Division in the 1924–25 season, before retiring from football.

In 2022, Psaila was selected by the IFFHS for their Malta all-time men's dream team.

== International career ==
While the Malta national football team did not exist yet, Psaila represented an MFA League XI during World War I.

== Personal life ==
Two of his sons, Romeo and Gejtu Jr, were also footballers.

== Honours ==
Ħamrun Spartans

- Maltese First Division: 1913–14, 1917–18

KOMRM

- Maltese First Division: 1918–19

Floriana

- Cassar Cup: 1923
- Maltese First Division: 1924–25

Individual

- IFFHS All-Time Malta Dream Team: 2022
