= 1947–48 Maltese Premier League =

Maltese First Division
- Season: 1947–48
- Champions: Valletta F.C. (5th title)
- Relegated: Melita F.C.
- Matches played: 56
- Goals scored: 242 (4.32 per match)

The 1947–48 Maltese First Division was the 33rd season of top-tier football in Malta. It was contested by 8 teams, and Valletta F.C. won the championship.

== League standings ==
Pos	Team	Pld	W	D	L	GF	GA	GD	Pts	Qualification
1	Valletta F.C. (C)	14	10	3	1	44	16	+28	23	Champions
2	Hamrun Spartans F.C.	14	10	1	3	43	27	+16	21	
3	Sliema Wanderers F.C.	14	7	5	2	35	23	+12	19	
4	Floriana F.C.	14	6	3	5	31	23	+8	15	
5	St. George's F.C.	14	6	2	6	31	40	−9	14	
6	Hibernians F.C.	14	4	3	7	29	35	−6	11	
7	Naxxar Lions	14	2	4	8	16	29	−13	8	
8	Melita F.C. (R)	14	0	1	13	13	49	−36	1	Relegation

Source: rsssf.com
(C) Champions; (R) Relegated

== Results ==
Home \ Away	FRN	HIB	ĦMR	MLT	NXR	SLM	STG	VLT
Floriana	—	1–1	2–3	6–0	3–1	2–3	7–2	0–5
Hibernians	2–3	—	2–5	2–1	3–3	1–1	1–1	2–3
Ħamrun Spartans	1–0	6–1	—	4–0	2–0	2–5	3–3	2–4
Melita	0–2	2–7	2–4	—	2–2	0–1	1–5	2–4
Naxxar Lions	1–2	0–2	0–1	2–0	—	1–2	2–1	0–4
Sliema Wanderers	2–2	2–5	5–2	4–1	1–1	—	5–1	2–3
St. George's	2–1	4–0	2–5	2–1	5–2	1–1	—	1–5
Valletta	0–0	3–0	1–3	4–1	1–1	1–1	6–1	—

Legend: Blue = home team win; Yellow = draw; Red = away team win.
