= 1946–47 Maltese Premier League =

Maltese First Division
- Season: 1946–47
- Champions: Hamrun Spartans F.C. (3rd title)
- Matches played: 56
- Goals scored: 220 (3.93 per match)

The 1946–47 Maltese First Division was the 32nd season of top-tier football in Malta. It was contested by 8 teams, and Hamrun Spartans F.C. won the championship.

== League standings ==
Pos	Team	Pld	W	D	L	GF	GA	GD	Pts	Qualification
1	Hamrun Spartans F.C. (C)	14	10	1	3	29	13	+16	21	Champions
2	Valletta F.C.	14	8	4	2	30	18	+12	20	
3	Floriana F.C.	14	7	3	4	30	17	+13	17	
4	Sliema Wanderers F.C.	14	6	2	6	30	25	+5	14	
5	Hibernians F.C.	14	5	2	7	25	34	−9	12	
6	Melita F.C.	14	4	3	7	29	39	−10	11	
7	St. George's F.C.	14	4	1	9	27	38	−11	9	
8	Naxxar Lions	14	2	4	8	20	36	−16	8	

Source: rsssf.com
(C) Champions

== Results ==
Home \ Away	FRN	HIB	ĦMR	MLT	NXR	SLM	STG	VLT
Floriana	—	1–2	1–2	1–4	4–0	2–1	1–1	1–1
Hibernians	1–0	—	0–2	6–3	1–1	2–3	1–3	1–4
Ħamrun Spartans	0–2	2–1	—	2–0	0–0	1–2	3–1	2–1
Melita	1–5	1–1	1–5	—	2–2	0–5	7–2	0–2
Naxxar Lions	3–5	6–1	2–4	1–3	—	1–5	3–2	0–1
Sliema Wanderers	0–3	1–3	0–3	2–3	0–0	—	1–2	4–0
St. George's	0–3	2–4	1–3	2–1	5–1	3–4	—	3–4
Valletta	1–1	5–1	1–0	3–3	3–0	2–2	2–0	—

Legend: Blue = home team win; Yellow = draw; Red = away team win.
