= 1927–28 Maltese Premier League =

Maltese First Division
- Season: 1927–28
- Champions: Floriana F.C. (8th title)
- Matches played: 19
- Goals scored: 68 (3.58 per match)

The 1927–28 Maltese First Division was the 17th season of top-tier football in Malta. It was contested by 7 teams, and Floriana F.C. won the championship.

== League standings ==
Pos	Team	Pld	W	D	L	GF	GA	GD	Pts
1	Floriana F.C. (C)	6	5	0	1	16	4	+12	10
2	Valletta United	6	4	1	1	16	4	+12	9
3	St. George's F.C.	6	2	2	2	13	4	+9	6
4	Cottonera	6	3	0	3	8	15	−7	6
5	Sliema Wanderers F.C.	6	2	1	3	6	6	0	5
6	Marsa United	6	2	0	4	4	12	−8	4
7	Sliema Rangers	6	1	0	5	5	23	−18	2

Source: rsssf.com
(C) Champions

== Results ==
Home \ Away	FLO	VAL	STG	COT	SLW	MRS	SLR
Floriana	—	1–3	1–0	4–0	3–0	4–0	3–1
Valletta United		—	1–1	2–1	0–1	2–0	8–0
St. George's			—	6–0	1–1	0–3 (Note: Match was awarded to St. George's with a 0–3 score)	5–1
Cottonera				—	3–0 (Note: Match was awarded to Cottonera with a 3–0 score)	3–2	4–1
Sliema Wanderers					—	1–2	3–0
Marsa United						—	0–2
Sliema Rangers							—
