= 1912–13 Maltese Premier League =

Maltese First Division
- Season: 1912–13
- Champions: Floriana (3rd title)
- Matches played: 21
- Goals scored: 77 (3.67 per match)

The 1912–13 Maltese First Division was the third edition Maltese First Division. Originally contested by eight teams, Valletta United were disqualified and their results expunged. With each team playing a match against the other, Floriana ended the season winning their third consecutive title.

== League table ==
Locations of the 1912–13 Maltese First Division teams

Pos	Team	Pld	W	D	L	GF	GA	GD	Pts
1	Floriana (C)	6	6	0	0	21	0	+21	12
2	Ħamrun Spartans	6	5	0	1	27	5	+22	10
3	Sliema Wanderers	6	4	0	2	14	11	+3	8
4	Vittoriosa Melita	6	3	0	3	7	16	−9	6
5	Msida Rangers	6	2	0	4	3	10	−7	4
6	St. George's	6	1	0	5	3	9	−6	2
7	Senglea Shamrocks	6	0	0	6	2	26	−24	0
8	Valletta United (D)	7	4	1	2	16	4	+12	9

Source: RSSSF
Rules for classification: 1) points
(C) Champions; (D) Disqualified

== Results ==
Home \ Away	FLO	ĦAM	SLI	VIT	MSD	STG	SEN
Floriana	—	2–0	3–0	8–0	2–0	3–0	3–0
Ħamrun Spartans		—	7–1	4–0	4–0	3–1	9–1
Sliema Wanderers			—	3–1	1–0	1–0	8–0
Vittoriosa Melita				—	3–0	1–0	2–1
Msida Rangers					—	1–0	2–0
St. George's						—	2–0
Senglea Shamrocks							—

Source: EU-Football.info

== See also ==
- 1912 in association football
- 1913 in association football
