= 1936–37 Maltese Premier League =

Maltese First Division
- Season: 1936–37
- Champions: Floriana F.C. (12th title)
- Matches: 12
- Goals: 27 (2.25 per match)

The 1936–37 Maltese First Division was the 26th season of top-tier football in Malta. It was contested by 4 teams, and Floriana F.C. won the championship.

== Teams ==
Locations of the 1936–37 Maltese First Division teams

== League standings ==
Pos	Team	Pld	W	D	L	GF	GA	GD	Pts
1	Floriana F.C. (C)	6	3	2	1	10	6	+4	8
2	Hibernians F.C.	6	2	2	2	5	6	−1	6
3	Sliema Wanderers F.C.	6	1	3	2	7	5	+2	5
4	St. George's F.C.	6	2	1	3	5	10	−5	5

Source: rsssf.com
(C) Champions

== Results ==
Home \ Away	FRN	HIB	SLM	STG
Floriana	—	2–1	1–1	3–1
Hibernians	2–2	—	0–0	0–2
Sliema Wanderers	0–2	0–1	—	1–1
St. George's	1–0	0–1	0–5	—

Legend: Blue = home team win; Yellow = draw; Red = away team win.
