= 1934–35 Maltese Premier League =

Maltese First Division
- Season: 1934–35
- Champions: Floriana F.C. (11th title)
- Matches: 20
- Goals: 78 (3.9 per match)
- Highest scoring: Sliema Wanderers 11-0 Ħamrun Spartans

The 1934–35 Maltese First Division was the 24th season of top-tier football in Malta. It was contested by 7 teams, and Floriana F.C. won the championship.

== League standings ==
Pos	Team	Pld	W	D	L	GF	GA	GD	Pts
1	Floriana F.C. (C)	6	5	1	0	15	1	+14	11
2	Sliema Wanderers F.C.	6	5	0	1	28	4	+24	10
3	Hibernians F.C.	6	4	1	1	15	3	+12	9
4	Sliema Rangers	6	2	1	3	11	15	−4	5
5	St. George's F.C.	6	1	2	3	2	10	−8	4
6	Marsa F.C.	6	1	1	4	4	20	−16	3
7	Hamrun Spartans F.C.	6	0	0	6	3	25	−22	0

Source: rsssf.com
(C) Champions

== Results ==
Home \ Away	FLO	SLW	HIB	SLR	STG	MRS	ĦAM
Floriana	—	2–1	0–0	4–0	2–0	7–0	3–0 (Note: Match was awarded to Floriana with a 3–0 score)
Sliema Wanderers		—	2–0	5–1	5–0	4–1	11–0
Hibernians			—	3–1	3–0	2–0	7–0
Sliema Rangers				—	0–0	6–1	3–2
St. George's					—	0–0	2–0
Marsa						—	2–1
Ħamrun Spartans							—
