= 1911–12 Maltese Premier League =

Maltese First Division
- Season: 1911–12
- Champions: Floriana (2nd title)
- Matches played: 10
- Goals scored: 16 (1.6 per match)

The 1911–12 Maltese First Division was the second edition Maltese First Division. It was contested between five teams, each playing a match against the other teams; Floriana were able to defend their title won in the first edition.

Locations of the 1911–12 Maltese First Division teams

== League table ==
Pos	Team	Pld	W	D	L	GF	GA	GD	Pts
1	Floriana (C)	4	4	0	0	7	0	+7	8
2	Ħamrun Spartans	4	1	2	1	4	3	+1	4
3	St. George's	4	1	1	2	2	3	−1	3
4	Valletta United	4	1	1	2	2	4	−2	3
5	Sliema Wanderers	4	0	2	2	1	6	−5	2

Source: RSSSF
Rules for classification: 1) points
(C) Champions

== Results ==
Home \ Away	FLO	ĦAM	SLI	STG	VAL
Floriana	—	2–0	3–0	1–0	1–0
Ħamrun Spartans		—	1–1	0–0	3–0
Sliema Wanderers			—	0–2	0–0
St. George's				—	0–2
Valletta United					—

Source: EU-Football.info

== See also ==
- 1911 in association football
- 1912 in association football
