= Pablo Doffo =

Argentine footballer

Personal information
- Full name: Pablo Cesar Doffo
- Date of birth: 6 April 1983 (age 43)
- Position: Midfielder

Senior career*
Years	Team	Apps	(Gls)
–2005	Sportivo Belgrano	23	(1)
2005	Talleres de Córdoba		
2006–2008	Hibernians		
2008–2012	Floriana	30+	(2+)
2012–2015	Naxxar Lions	62	(1)
2015–2017	Senglea Athletic	47	(1)
2017–2023	Marsaxlokk	64	(9)
- * Club domestic league appearances and goals

Pablo Doffo (born 6 April 1983 in Argentina) is an Argentinean retired footballer.

He coached the Maltese Side Sliema Wanderers F.C. as of the 1st of February. He has led them to a solid 5th place in his debut in the 2025-26 Malta Premier League season.

Now he coaches Naxxar Lions F.C. from the Maltese Challenger League after Naxxars relegation to Mosta F.C. 1–0.
