= 1917–18 Maltese Premier League =

Maltese First Division
- Season: 1917–18
- Champions: Ħamrun Spartans (2nd title)
- Matches played: 28
- Goals scored: 93 (3.32 per match)

The 1917–18 Maltese First Division was the seventh season of the Maltese First Division. With each team playing each other once, Ħamrun Spartans and St. George's finished equal on points. The decider play-off played between the two saw Ħamrun Spartans triumphing 4–2, thereby gaining their second league title.

== League table ==
Pos	Team	Pld	W	D	L	GF	GA	GD	Pts
1	Ħamrun Spartans (C)	7	5	2	0	22	3	+19	12
2	St. George's	7	6	0	1	18	7	+11	12
3	Sliema Wanderers	7	5	1	1	16	3	+13	11
4	Valletta United	7	3	1	3	14	9	+5	7
5	Floriana	7	2	3	2	10	7	+3	7
6	Paola Rovers	7	1	2	4	5	11	−6	4
7	Cottonera	7	1	1	5	4	19	−15	3
8	Floriana Liberty	7	0	0	7	5	35	−30	0

Source: RSSSF
Rules for classification: 1) Points; 2) Play-offs (only if needed to decide champions).
(C) Champions

== Championship tie-breaker ==
With both Ħamrun Spartans and St. George's level on 12 points, a play-off match was conducted to decide the champion.

Ħamrun Spartans	4–2	St. George's

== Results ==
Home \ Away	ĦAM	STG	SLI	VAL	FLO	PAO	COT	FLL
Ħamrun Spartans	—	4–0	0–0	1–0	0–0	3–2	2–1	12–0
St. George's		—	2–1	1–0	1–0	3–0	3–1	8–1
Sliema Wanderers			—	3–1	3–0	1–0	6–0	2–0
Valletta United				—	2–2	2–0	3–0	6–2
Floriana					—	0–0	4–0	4–1
Paola Rovers						—	1–0	2–1
Cottonera							—	1–0
Floriana Liberty								—

Source: EU-Football.info

== See also ==
- 1917 in association football
- 1918 in association football
