= 1948–49 Maltese Premier League =

Maltese First Division
- Season: 1948–49
- Champions: Sliema Wanderers F.C. (12th title)
- Relegated: Naxxar Lions
- Matches played: 57
- Goals scored: 209 (3.67 per match)

The 1948–49 Maltese First Division was the 34th season of top-tier football in Malta. It was contested by 8 teams, and Sliema Wanderers F.C. won the championship.

The team managed to gain the top of the leaderboard only on the penultimate day, after winning by 1-0 a decisive clash against the historical rivals of Floriana.

== League standings ==
Pos	Team	Pld	W	D	L	GF	GA	GD	Pts	Qualification
1	Sliema Wanderers F.C. (C)	14	11	0	3	33	15	+18	22	Champions
2	Hamrun Spartans F.C.	14	9	2	3	38	22	+16	20	
3	Valletta F.C.	14	9	1	4	40	20	+20	19	
4	Floriana F.C.	14	6	5	3	24	19	+5	17	
5	Hibernians F.C.	14	5	5	4	24	20	+4	15	
6	St. Andrews F.C.	14	3	1	10	13	33	−20	7	
7	St. George's F.C.	14	1	4	9	19	42	−23	6	
8	Naxxar Lions (R)	14	2	2	10	13	33	−20	6	Relegation

Source: rsssf.com
(C) Champions; (R) Relegated

=== Relegation tie-breaker ===
With both St. George's and Naxxar Lions level on 6 points, a play-off match was conducted to determine 8th place and the relegation.

St. George's F.C.	4–1	Naxxar Lions

== Results ==
Home \ Away	FRN	HIB	ĦMR	NXR	SLM	STA	STG	VLT
Floriana	—	1–1	3–3	1–0	0–1	1–0	2–1	4–1
Hibernians	0–0	—	0–0	3–0	1–2	5–1	1–1	1–2
Ħamrun Spartans	2–3	3–1	—	3–2	2–3	3–0	4–0	1–4
Naxxar Lions	1–1	3–3	0–2	—	0–2	1–2	2–1	0–6
Sliema Wanderers	3–2	6–2	1–3	3–0	—	3–1	4–0	0–1
St. Andrews	0–1	0–2	2–5	0–1	0–2	—	2–2	2–1
St. George's	3–3	1–2	1–6	1–0	0–3	2–3	—	3–3
Valletta	3–2	0–2	0–1	5–3	3–0	4–0	7–1	—

Legend: Blue = home team win; Yellow = draw; Red = away team win.
