= Joe Cini =

Maltese former footballer

Personal information
- Date of birth: 29 November 1936 (age 89)
- Place of birth: Malta
- Position: Striker

Senior career*
Years	Team	Apps	(Gls)
1956–1959	Floriana	?	(?)
1959–1960	Queens Park Rangers	7	(1)
1960–1973	Sliema Wanderers	?	(?)
Total		?	(?)

International career
1957–1972	Malta	18	(2)
- * Club domestic league appearances and goals

Joe Cini (born 29 November 1936) is a Maltese former footballer who played as a striker.

== Career ==
Cini played in his native Malta for Floriana and Sliema Wanderers, as well as for Queens Park Rangers in England, scoring one goals in seven appearances in The Football League during the 1959–1960 season. Cini also represented the Malta national side at international level, scoring 2 goals in 18 appearances between 1957 and 1972.
