= 1926–27 Maltese Premier League =

Maltese First Division
- Season: 1926–27
- Champions: Floriana F.C. (7th title)
- Matches played: 6
- Goals scored: 8 (1.33 per match)

The 1926–27 Maltese First Division was the 16th season of top-tier football in Malta. It was contested by 4 teams, and Floriana F.C. won the championship.

== Teams ==
Locations of the 1926–27 Maltese First Division teams

== League standings ==
| Pos | Team | Pld | W | D | L | GF | GA | GD | Pts |
|---|---|---|---|---|---|---|---|---|---|
| 1 | Floriana F.C. (C) | 3 | 2 | 1 | 0 | 3 | 1 | +2 | 5 |
| 2 | Sliema Wanderers F.C. | 3 | 1 | 1 | 1 | 3 | 2 | +1 | 3 |
| 3 | St. George's F.C. | 3 | 0 | 2 | 1 | 1 | 2 | −1 | 2 |
| 4 | Valletta Rovers | 3 | 0 | 2 | 1 | 1 | 3 | −2 | 2 |

Source: rsssf.com
(C) Champions

== Results ==
| Home \ Away | FLO | SLI | STG | VLR |
|---|---|---|---|---|
| Floriana | — | 2–1 | 1–0 | 0–0 |
| Sliema Wanderers | | — | 0–0 | 2–0 |
| St. George's | | | — | 1–1 |
| Valletta Rovers | | | | — |
