= 1937–38 Maltese Premier League =

Maltese First Division
- Season: 1937–38
- Champions: Sliema Wanderers F.C. (9th title)
- Matches: 12
- Goals: 31 (2.58 per match)

The 1937–38 Maltese First Division was the 27th season of top-tier football in Malta. It was contested by 4 teams, and Sliema Wanderers F.C. won the championship.

== Teams ==
Locations of the 1937–38 Maltese First Division teams

== League standings ==
Pos	Team	Pld	W	D	L	GF	GA	GD	Pts
1	Sliema Wanderers F.C. (C)	6	4	2	0	13	4	+9	10
2	Floriana F.C.	6	3	2	1	11	5	+6	8
3	Valletta City	6	0	3	3	4	9	−5	3
4	St. George's F.C.	6	1	1	4	3	13	−10	3

Source: rsssf.com
(C) Champions

== Results ==
Home \ Away	FRN	SLM	STG	VAL
Floriana	—	2–3	1–0	2–0
Sliema Wanderers	0–0	—	1–0	3–1
St. George's	1–5	0–5	—	1–1
Valletta City	1–1	1–1	0–1	—

Legend: Blue = home team win; Yellow = draw; Red = away team win.
