= 1964–65 Maltese Premier League =

Maltese First Division
- Season: 1964–65
- Champions: Sliema Wanderers F.C. (17th title)
- Relegated: Gzira United; Rabat
- European Cup: Sliema Wanderers F.C.
- European Cup Winners' Cup: Floriana F.C.
- Matches played: 42
- Goals scored: 168 (4 per match)

The 1964–65 Maltese First Division was the 50th season of top-tier football in Malta. It was contested by 7 teams, and Sliema Wanderers F.C. won the championship.

== League standings ==
Pos	Team	Pld	W	D	L	GF	GA	GD	Pts	Qualification
1	Sliema Wanderers F.C. (C)	12	9	2	1	36	9	+27	20	Qualification for the European Cup
2	Valletta F.C.	12	8	2	2	42	6	+36	18	
3	Hibernians F.C.	12	7	2	3	31	13	+18	16	
4	Floriana F.C.	12	5	3	4	27	18	+9	13	Qualification for the European Cup Winners' Cup (Note: Floriana qualified for the Cup Winners' Cup as Maltese FA Trophy Runners-up, as winners Sliema Wanderers already qualified for the European Cup.)
5	Hamrun Spartans F.C.	12	3	3	6	17	24	−7	9	
6	Gzira United (R)	12	3	0	9	12	30	−18	6	Relegation
7	Rabat (R)	12	1	0	11	3	68	−65	2	Relegation

Source: rsssf.com
(C) Champions; (R) Relegated

== Results ==
Home \ Away	FLO	GŻI	HIB	ĦAM	RBT	SLM	VLT
Floriana	—	4–2	0–0	2–3	4–0	3–0	0–2
Gżira United	0–1	—	0–5	2–1	2–0	0–2	1–2
Hibernians	6–0	2–1	—	3–0	5–0	0–4	1–2
Ħamrun Spartans	1–1	1–0	0–0	—	0–1	2–2	0–5
Rabat	1–11	0–4	1–4	0–8	—	0–4	0–9
Sliema Wanderers	2–0	9–0	4–3	4–1	4–0	—	1–0
Valletta	1–1	3–0	1–2	4–0	13–0	0–0	—

Legend: Blue = home team win; Yellow = draw; Red = away team win.
