= 1931–32 Maltese Premier League =

Maltese First Division
- Season: 1931–32
- Champions: Valletta United (2nd title)
- Matches played: 6
- Goals scored: 26 (4.33 per match)

The 1931–32 Maltese First Division was the 21st season of top-tier football in Malta. It was contested by 4 teams, and Valletta United won the championship.

== League standings ==
Pos	Team	Pld	W	D	L	GF	GA	GD	Pts
1	Valletta United (C)	3	2	1	0	6	1	+5	5
2	Sliema Wanderers F.C.	3	2	0	1	13	3	+10	4
3	Sliema Hotspurs	3	1	0	2	4	11	−7	2
4	Hamrun Spartans F.C.	3	0	1	2	2	10	−8	1

Source: rsssf.com
(C) Champions

== Results ==
Home \ Away	VAL	SLW	SLH	ĦAM
Valletta United	—	2–1	4–0	0–0
Sliema Wanderers		—	7–0	6–1
Sliema Hotspurs			—	4–1
Ħamrun Spartans				—
