= 1918–19 Maltese Premier League =

Maltese First Division
- Season: 1918–19
- Champions: King's Own Malta Regiment (1st title)
- Matches played: 10
- Goals scored: 29 (2.9 per match)

The 1918–19 Maltese First Division was the eighth season of the Maltese First Division and was won by team representing the King's Own Malta Regiment.

== League table ==
Pos	Team	Pld	W	D	L	GF	GA	GD	Pts
1	King's Own Malta Regiment (C)	4	4	0	0	9	0	+9	8
2	Ħamrun Spartans	4	3	0	1	6	4	+2	6
3	Army Service Corps	4	1	0	3	4	6	−2	2
4	Sliema Amateurs	4	1	0	3	5	8	−3	2
5	Cospicua Rangers	4	1	0	3	4	10	−6	2

Source: EU-Football.info
Rules for classification: 1) points;
(C) Champions

== Results ==
Home \ Away	KOM	ĦAM	ASC	SLA	COS
King's Own Malta Regiment	—	2–0	1–0	4–0	2–0
Ħamrun Spartans		—	1–0	1–0	4–2
Army Service Corps			—	3–2	1–2
Sliema Amateurs				—	3–0 (Note: Match was awarded to Sliema Amateurs with a 3–0 score)
Cospicua Rangers					—

Source: EU-Football.info

== See also ==
- 1918 in association football
- 1919 in association football
