= 1928–29 Maltese Premier League =

Maltese First Division
- Season: 1928–29
- Champions: Floriana F.C. (9th title)
- Matches played: 6
- Goals scored: 15 (2.5 per match)
- Biggest home win: Floriana F.C. 4-1 Sliema Wanderers F.C.
- Biggest away win: Valletta United 0-2 Sliema Wanderers F.C.
- Highest scoring: Floriana F.C. 4-1 Sliema Wanderers F.C.

The 1928–29 Maltese First Division was the 18th season of top-tier football in Malta. It was contested by 3 teams, and Floriana F.C. won the championship.

== Teams ==
Locations of the 1928–29 Maltese First Division teams

== League standings ==
Pos	Team	Pld	W	D	L	GF	GA	GD	Pts
1	Floriana F.C. (C)	4	3	1	0	9	4	+5	7
2	Sliema Wanderers F.C.	4	1	2	1	5	6	−1	4
3	Valletta United	4	0	1	3	1	5	−4	1

Source: rsssf.com
(C) Champions

== Results ==
Home \ Away	FLO	SLI	VAL
Floriana	—	4–1	1–0
Sliema Wanderers	2–2	—	0–0
Valletta United	1–2	0–2	—

Legend: Blue = home team win; Yellow = draw; Red = away team win.
