= Adrian Mifsud =

Maltese footballer

Personal information
- Full name: Adrian Mifsud
- Date of birth: 11 December 1974 (age 51)
- Place of birth: Rabat, Malta
- Position: Striker

Team information
- Current team: Rabat Ajax

Senior career*
Years	Team	Apps	(Gls)
1995–2000	Rabat Ajax	72	(21)
2000–2004	Hibernians	111	(80)
2004–2006	Sliema Wanderers	18	(1)
2006–2008	Floriana	52	(27)
2008	→Hibernians (loan)	6	(2)
2008–	Rabat Ajax	31	(8)

International career^{‡}
1999–2003	Malta	15	(0)
- * Club domestic league appearances and goals as of 10 January 2010 ‡ National team caps and goals as of 10 January 2010

Adrian Mifsud (born 11 December 1974 in Rabat, Malta) is a professional footballer currently playing for Maltese Second Division side Rabat Ajax, where he plays as a striker.
