= 1938–39 Maltese Premier League =

Maltese First Division
- Season: 1938–39
- Champions: Sliema Wanderers F.C. (10th title)
- Matches: 12
- Goals: 35 (2.92 per match)

The 1938–39 Maltese First Division was the 28th season of top-tier football in Malta. It was contested by 4 teams, and Sliema Wanderers F.C. won the championship.

== Teams ==
Locations of the 1938–39 Maltese First Division teams

== League standings ==
Pos	Team	Pld	W	D	L	GF	GA	GD	Pts
1	Sliema Wanderers F.C. (C)	6	5	1	0	17	4	+13	11
2	Melita F.C.	6	2	1	3	9	12	−3	5
3	St. George's F.C.	6	1	2	3	5	10	−5	4
4	Valletta City	6	1	2	3	4	9	−5	4

Source: rsssf.com
(C) Champions

== Results ==
Home \ Away	MLT	SLM	STG	VAL
Melita	—	2–3	2–0	5–3
Sliema Wanderers	3–0	—	2–2	1–0
St. George's	3–0	0–5	—	0–1
Valletta City	0–0	0–3	0–0	—

Legend: Blue = home team win; Yellow = draw; Red = away team win.
