= 1929–30 Maltese Premier League =

Maltese First Division
- Season: 1929–30
- Champions: Sliema Wanderers F.C. (5th title)
- Matches played: 10
- Goals scored: 43 (4.3 per match)

The 1929–30 Maltese First Division was the 19th season of top-tier football in Malta. It was contested by 5 teams, and Sliema Wanderers F.C. won the championship.

== League standings ==
Pos	Team	Pld	W	D	L	GF	GA	GD	Pts
1	Sliema Wanderers F.C. (Note: A decider was due to be played the following season but since St. George's did not form a team, Sliema were awarded a walk-over.) (C)	4	3	1	0	14	5	+9	7
2	St. George's F.C.	4	3	1	0	15	4	+11	7
3	Valletta United	4	1	1	2	8	12	−4	3
4	Sliema Rangers	4	0	2	2	3	10	−7	2
5	Cottonera	4	0	1	3	3	12	−9	1

Source: rsssf.com
(C) Champions

== Results ==
Home \ Away	SLW	STG	VAL	SLR	COT
Sliema Wanderers	—	3–3	3–2	4–0	4–0
St. George's		—	4–0	3–0	5–1
Valletta United			—	3–3	3–2
Sliema Rangers				—	0–0
Cottonera					—
