= 1930–31 Maltese Premier League =

Maltese First Division
- Season: 1930–31
- Champions: Floriana F.C. (10th title)
- Matches played: 12
- Goals scored: 36 (3 per match)

The 1930–31 Maltese First Division was the 20th season of top-tier football in Malta. It was contested by 4 teams, and Floriana F.C. won the championship.

== Teams ==
Locations of the 1930–31 Maltese First Division teams

== League standings ==
Pos	Team	Pld	W	D	L	GF	GA	GD	Pts
1	Floriana F.C. (C)	6	6	0	0	13	1	+12	12
2	Sliema Wanderers F.C.	6	2	2	2	10	9	+1	6
3	Valletta United	6	1	2	3	8	11	−3	4
4	Ħamrun Spartans F.C.	6	0	2	4	5	15	−10	2

Source: rsssf.com
(C) Champions

== Results ==
Home \ Away	FLO	ĦAM	SLI	VAL
Floriana	—	2–0	1–0	2–1
Ħamrun Spartans	0–3	—	1–4	1–1
Sliema Wanderers	0–2	2–2	—	1–1
Valletta United	0–3	3–1	2–3	—

Legend: Blue = home team win; Yellow = draw; Red = away team win.
