= 1920–21 Maltese Premier League =

Maltese First Division
- Season: 1920–21
- Champions: Floriana F.C. (4th title)
- Matches played: 27
- Goals scored: 103 (3.81 per match)

The 1920–21 Maltese First Division was the 10th season of top-tier football in Malta. It was contested by 9 teams, and Floriana F.C. won the championship.

== League standings ==
| Pos | Team | Pld | W | D | L | GF | GA | GD | Pts |
|---|---|---|---|---|---|---|---|---|---|
| 1 | Floriana F.C. (C) | 8 | 8 | 0 | 0 | 26 | 1 | +25 | 16 |
| 2 | Marsa United | 8 | 6 | 1 | 1 | 19 | 2 | +17 | 13 |
| 3 | Hamrun Spartans F.C. | 8 | 6 | 1 | 1 | 14 | 6 | +8 | 13 |
| 4 | Valletta United | 7 | 4 | 0 | 3 | 9 | 6 | +3 | 8 |
| 5 | Paola United | 8 | 2 | 2 | 4 | 8 | 11 | −3 | 6 |
| 6 | Sliema Rangers | 7 | 2 | 1 | 4 | 12 | 13 | −1 | 5 |
| 7 | Qormi United | 8 | 2 | 1 | 5 | 5 | 26 | −21 | 5 |
| 8 | Msida Rangers | 8 | 1 | 0 | 7 | 4 | 18 | −14 | 2 |
| 9 | Dockyard Police | 8 | 1 | 0 | 7 | 6 | 20 | −14 | 2 |

Source: rsssf.com
Rules for classification: 1) points
(C) Champions

Sliema Wanderers F.C. and St. George's F.C. were removed from the competition

== Results ==
| Home \ Away | FLO | MRS | ĦAM | VAL | PAO | SLI | QOR | DOC | MSD |
|---|---|---|---|---|---|---|---|---|---|
| Floriana | — | 1–0 | 1–0 | 2–1 | 7–0 | 1–0 | 3–0 (Note: Match was awarded to Floriana with a 3–0 score) | 8–0 | 6–0 |
| Marsa United | | — | 1–1 | 1–0 | 1–0 | 3–0 | 13–0 | 3–0 (Note: Match was awarded to Marsa United with a 3–0 score) | 3–0 |
| Ħamrun Spartans | | | — | 2–1 | 3–0 (Note: Match was awarded to Ħamrun Spartans with a 3–0 score) | 4–1 | 7–2 | 3–0 | 3–0 |
| Valletta United | | | | — | 3–0 (Note: Match was awarded to Valletta United with a 3–0 score) | | 3–0 | 3–0 | 4–1 |
| Paola United | | | | | — | 2–2 | 0–0 | 3–1 | 3–0 |
| Sliema Rangers | | | | | | — | 5–0 | 1–3 | 3–0 |
| Qormi United | | | | | | | — | 2–1 | 1–0 |
| Dockyard Police | | | | | | | | — | 1–3 |
| Msida Rangers | | | | | | | | | — |
