= 1925–26 Maltese Premier League =

Football season

Maltese First Division
- Season: 1925–26
- Champions: Sliema Wanderers F.C. (4th title)
- Matches played: 20
- Goals scored: 68 (3.4 per match)

The 1925–26 Maltese First Division was the 15th season of top-tier football in Malta. It was contested by 7 teams, and Sliema Wanderers F.C. won the championship.

== League standings ==
Pos	Team	Pld	W	D	L	GF	GA	GD	Pts
1	Sliema Wanderers F.C. (C)	6	6	0	0	27	2	+25	12
2	Floriana F.C.	6	4	1	1	15	7	+8	9
3	Valletta United	6	3	0	3	16	8	+8	6
4	Valletta Rovers	6	2	1	3	5	23	−18	5
5	Msida Rovers	6	2	0	4	3	7	−4	4
6	St. George's F.C.	6	0	3	3	3	10	−7	3
7	Sliema Rangers	6	1	1	4	2	14	−12	3

Source: rsssf.com
(C) Champions

== Results ==
Home \ Away	SLW	FLO	VLU	VLO	MSD	STG	SLR
Sliema Wanderers	—	4–1	3–1	9–0	1–0	5–0	5–0
Floriana		—	3–2	4–0	3–0	3–0	1–1
Valletta United			—	8–0	0–1	3–0	2–1
Valletta Rovers				—	3–1	2–1	1–0
Msida Rovers					—	0–3 (Note: Match was awarded to St. George's with a 0–3 score)	1–0
St. George's						—	1–1
Sliema Rangers							—
