= 1921–22 Maltese Premier League =

Maltese First Division
- Season: 1921–22
- Champions: Floriana F.C. (5th title)
- Matches played: 21
- Goals scored: 50 (2.38 per match)

The 1921–22 Maltese First Division was the 11th season of top-tier football in Malta. It was contested by 7 teams, and Floriana F.C. won the championship.

== League standings ==
Pos	Team	Pld	W	D	L	GF	GA	GD	Pts
1	Floriana F.C. (C)	6	4	2	0	8	1	+7	10
2	Sliema Wanderers F.C.	6	4	1	1	13	7	+6	9
3	Malta Police	6	3	2	1	10	3	+7	8
4	Valletta United	6	3	1	2	10	10	0	7
5	St. George's F.C.	6	0	4	2	2	6	−4	4
6	Sliema Rangers	6	1	1	4	3	9	−6	3
7	Old Lions	6	0	1	5	4	14	−10	1

Source: rsssf.com
(C) Champions

== Results ==
Home \ Away	FLO	SLW	MPO	VAL	STG	SLR	OLL
Floriana	—	1–1	0–0	2–0	1–0	2–0	2–0
Sliema Wanderers		—	2–1	2–3	3–0	3–1	2–1
Malta Police			—	4–1	0–0	2–0	3–0
Valletta United				—	1–1	1–0	4–1
St. George's					—	0–0	1–1
Sliema Rangers						—	2–1
Old Lions							—
