= 1919–20 Maltese Premier League =

Maltese First Division
- Season: 1919–20
- Champions: Sliema Wanderers (1st title)
- Matches played: 15
- Goals scored: 42 (2.8 per match)

The 1919–20 Maltese First Division was the ninth season of the Maltese First Division and was won for the first time by Sliema Wanderers.

== League table ==
Locations of the 1919–20 Maltese First Division teams

Pos	Team	Pld	W	D	L	GF	GA	GD	Pts
1	Sliema Wanderers (C)	5	3	2	0	10	2	+8	8
2	Ħamrun Spartans	5	3	1	1	10	5	+5	7
3	Valletta United	5	2	2	1	9	3	+6	6
4	Cottonera United	5	1	3	1	5	8	−3	5
5	Marsa United	5	1	1	3	4	5	−1	3
6	Paola United	5	0	1	4	4	19	−15	1

Source: RSSSF
Rules for classification: 1) points
(C) Champions

== Results ==
Home \ Away	SLI	ĦAM	VAL	COT	MRS	PAO
Sliema Wanderers	—	3–0	2–1	1–1	0–0	4–0
Ħamrun Spartans		—	1–1	4–0	3–0	2–1
Valletta United			—	0–0	1–0	6–0
Cottonera United				—	1–0	3–3
Marsa United					—	4–0
Paola United						—

Source: EU-Football.info

== See also ==
- 1919 in association football
- 1920 in association football
