= 1913–14 Maltese Premier League =

Maltese First Division
- Season: 1913–14
- Champions: Ħamrun Spartans (1st title)
- Matches played: 21
- Goals scored: 67 (3.19 per match)

The 1913–14 Maltese First Division was the fourth edition Maltese First Division, won for the first time by Ħamrun Spartans by goal difference.

== League table ==
Pos	Team	Pld	W	D	L	GF	GA	GD	Pts
1	Ħamrun Spartans (C)	6	5	0	1	22	1	+21	10
2	St. George's	6	5	0	1	15	2	+13	10
3	Valletta United	6	4	0	2	7	5	+2	8
4	Floriana	6	3	0	3	10	16	−6	6
5	Msida Rangers	6	2	1	3	6	7	−1	5
6	Senglea Shamrocks	6	1	1	4	6	19	−13	3
7	Vittoriosa Melita	6	0	0	6	1	17	−16	0

Source: RSSSF
Rules for classification: 1) points; 2) goal difference; 3) number of goals scored.
(C) Champions

== Results ==
Home \ Away	ĦAM	STG	VAL	FLO	MSD	SEN	VIT
Ħamrun Spartans	—	0–1	2–0	11–0	1–0	5–0	3–0
St. George's		—	1–0	0–2	3–0	5–0	5–0
Valletta United			—	1–0	2–1	3–1	1–0
Floriana				—	0–2	4–2	4–0
Msida Rangers					—	1–1	2–0
Senglea Shamrocks						—	2–1
Vittoriosa Melita							—

Source: EU-Football.info

== See also ==
- 1913 in association football
- 1914 in association football
