= 1924–25 Maltese Premier League =

Maltese First Division
- Season: 1924–25
- Champions: Floriana F.C. (6th title)
- Matches played: 26
- Goals scored: 64 (2.46 per match)

The 1924–25 Maltese First Division was the 14th season of top-tier football in Malta. It was contested by 8 teams, and Floriana F.C. won the championship.

== League standings ==
Pos	Team	Pld	W	D	L	GF	GA	GD	Pts
1	Floriana F.C. (C)	7	6	1	0	12	2	+10	13
2	Sliema Wanderers F.C.	7	5	1	1	14	1	+13	11
3	Valletta United	6	3	2	1	12	2	+10	8
4	Valletta Rovers	7	2	2	3	8	6	+2	6
5	Vittoriosa Rovers	6	3	0	3	6	8	−2	6
6	Sliema Rangers	6	1	2	3	7	12	−5	4
7	Hamrun Spartans F.C.	7	1	1	5	3	18	−15	3
8	Msida Rovers	6	0	1	5	2	15	−13	1

Source: rsssf.com
(C) Champions

== Results ==
Home \ Away	FLO	SLW	VLU	VLR	VIT	SLR	ĦAM	MSD
Floriana	—	1–0	1–0	1–0	4–0	1–1	1–0	3–1
Sliema Wanderers		—	0–0	1–0	2–0	6–0	4–0	1–0
Valletta United			—	1–1		2–0	4–0	5–0
Valletta Rovers				—	0–1	1–1	4–1	2–0
Vittoriosa Rovers					—	2–1	0–1	3–0
Sliema Rangers						—	4–0	
Ħamrun Spartans							—	1–1
Msida Rovers								—
