= 1932–33 Maltese Premier League =

Maltese First Division
- Season: 1932–33
- Champions: Sliema Wanderers F.C. (6th title)
- Matches: 6
- Goals: 22 (3.67 per match)

The 1932–33 Maltese First Division was the 22nd season of top-tier football in Malta. It was contested by 4 teams, and Sliema Wanderers F.C. won the championship.

== League standings ==
Pos	Team	Pld	W	D	L	GF	GA	GD	Pts
1	Sliema Wanderers F.C. (Note: A decider was due to be played but since Hibernians did not show, Sliema were awarded a walk-over.) (C)	3	2	1	0	9	2	+7	5
2	Hibernians F.C.	3	2	1	0	7	2	+5	5
3	Sliema Rangers	3	1	0	2	4	10	−6	2
4	Hamrun Spartans F.C.	3	0	0	3	1	7	−6	0

Source: rsssf.com
(C) Champions

== Results ==
Home \ Away	SLW	HIB	SLR	ĦAM
Sliema Wanderers	—	1–1	7–1	2–0
Hibernians		—	3–1	3–0
Sliema Rangers			—	2–1
Ħamrun Spartans				—
