= Maltese Premier League =

Association football top division of Malta

- Organising body: Malta Football Association (MFA)
- Founded: 1909; 117 years ago
- Country: Malta
- Confederation: UEFA
- Number of clubs: 12
- Level on pyramid: 1
- Relegation to: Maltese Challenge League
- Domestic cup(s): Maltese FA Trophy; Maltese Super Cup
- International cup(s): UEFA Champions League; UEFA Conference League
- Current champions: Floriana (27th title) (2025–26)
- Most championships: Floriana (27 titles)
- Broadcaster: TVMSport+ (Live Matches)
- Website: www.maltapremierleague.mt
- Current: 2026–27 season

The Maltese Premier League, known as VBET Malta Premier for sponsorship reasons with VBet (colloquially known as Il-Kampjonat Premjer), is the highest level of professional football in Malta. Managed by the Malta Football Association, the Premier League is contested by 12 teams and operates on a promotion and relegation system with the Challenge League. As of October 2026, the Premier League ranks 47th out of 55 members in the UEFA coefficient.

The league was first contested in 1909 as the First Division, before switching to its current name in 1980; the First Division in turn replaced the Second Division. Floriana have won the title a record 27 times. The current champions are Floriana who won the title in the 2025–26 season.

== Format ==
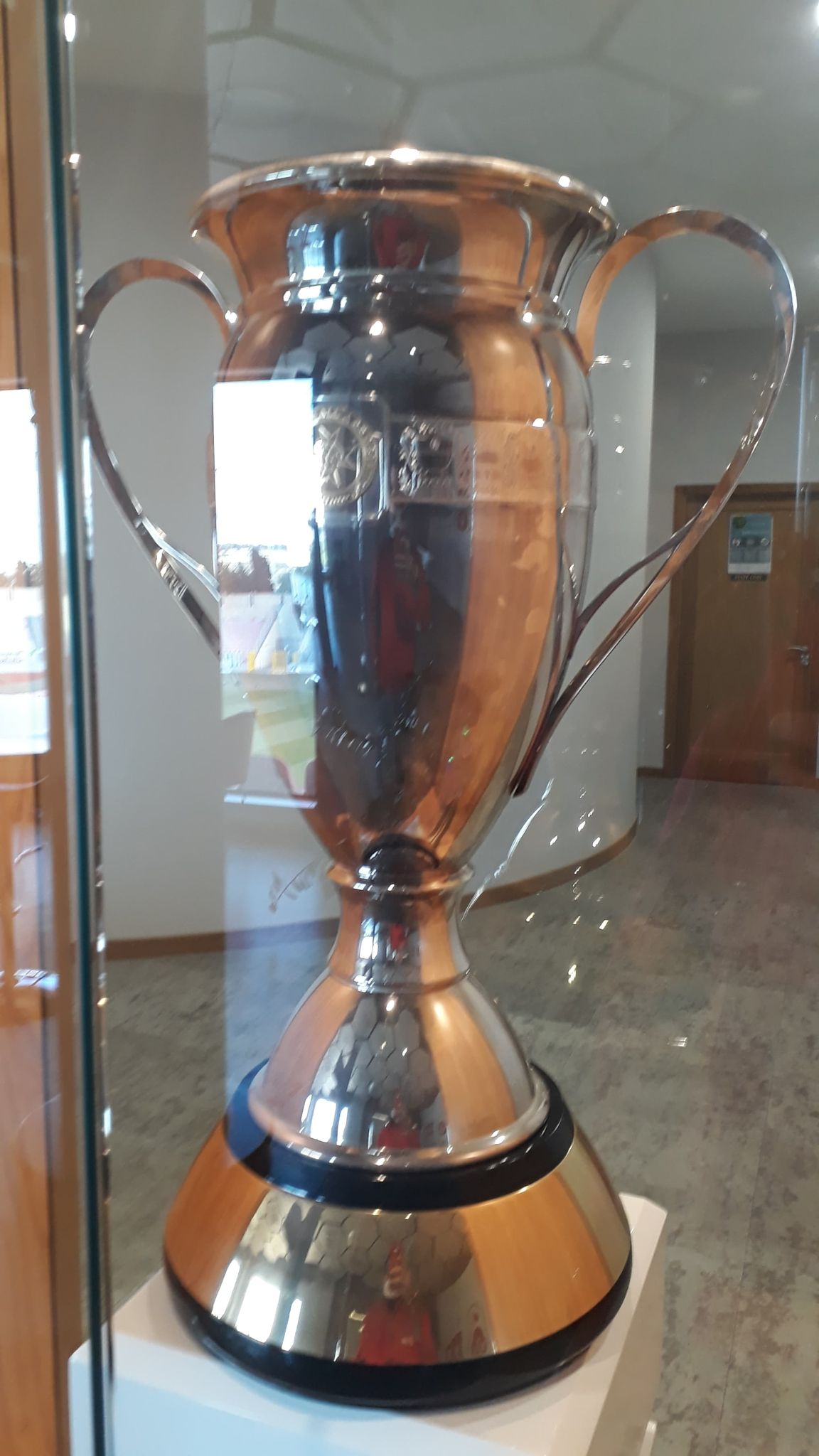
Current design of Maltese Premier League Trophy since 2018

- 5 clubs: 1909–1912
- 8 clubs: 1912–1913
- 7 clubs: 1913–1914
- 6 clubs: 1914–1917
- 8 clubs: 1917–1918
- 5 clubs: 1918–1919
- 6 clubs: 1919–1920
- 9 clubs: 1920–1921
- 7 clubs: 1921–1922
- 6 clubs: 1922–1923
- 5 clubs: 1923–1924
- 8 clubs: 1924–1925
- 7 clubs: 1925–1926
- 4 clubs: 1926–1927
- 7 clubs: 1927–1928
- 3 clubs: 1928–1929
- 5 clubs: 1929–1930
- 4 clubs: 1930–1933
- 2 clubs: 1933–1934
- 7 clubs: 1934–1935
- 3 clubs: 1935–1936
- 4 clubs: 1936–1945
- 7 clubs: 1945–1946
- 8 clubs: 1946–1964
- 7 clubs: 1964–1965
- 6 clubs: 1965–1967
- 8 clubs: 1967–1971
- 10 clubs: 1971–1980
- 8 clubs: 1980–1988
- 9 clubs: 1988–1991
- 10 clubs: 1991–2011
- 12 clubs: 2011–2017
- 14 clubs: 2017–2020
- 16 clubs: 2020–2021
- 12 clubs: 2021–2022
- 14 clubs: 2022–2024
- 12 clubs: 2024–

In a Premier League the league format, which will come into being from the 2024–25 season, the Maltese Premier League will be made up of 12 teams and be split into an Opening Round and Closing Round in a way that is similar to domestic footballing systems used in South America. The Opening Round will see each of the 12 teams play each other once before the league is then split between a Top 6 and a Bottom 6, allowing for the teams in each of those splits to play each other another time. Once the ranking is set, each team will return to 0 points and start from scratch in the Closing Round, where the same process will be repeated. Teams receive three points for a win and one point for a draw. No points are awarded for a loss. The club with the most points is crowned champions. Suppose two teams are level on points at the end of the season (to decide champions, for relegation or for UEFA competitions). In that case, there will be a play-off to decide the finishing order of the teams. If three or more teams are tied on points (to determine champions, for relegation or UEFA competitions), teams are ranked by Head-to-head points and the best two teams will play a play-off. The four lowest placed teams are relegated into the Challenge League

Clubs finishing the season in the top positions of the Premier League are granted qualification to compete in one of UEFA's European competitions. This is determined by Malta's position in the UEFA coefficient ranking system.

The league winner qualifies for the first qualifying round for the UEFA Champions League. The second- and third-placed teams qualify for the first qualifying round of the UEFA Europa Conference League. An additional Europa Conference League place is available through the country's domestic cup competition, the FA Trophy. If the winner of the FA Trophy qualifies for Europe through their league position, the fourth-placed team in the league qualifies for the UEFA Europa Conference League's first qualifying round.

== Sponsorship ==
Period	Sponsor	Brand
1990–1996	Coca-Cola	Coca-Cola Premier League
1996–2002	Rothmans	Rothmans Premier League
2002–2004	MIA	MIA Premier League
2004–2024	BOV	BOV Premier League
2024–2025	360Sports	360Sports Malta Premier
2025–2026	Yo Health	Yo Health Malta Premier
2026-	VBET	VBET Malta Premier

Key Sponsors for 2026/27 Season:

- Title Sponsor: VBET
- Official Sponsor: Meridianbet
- Official Match Ball Sponsor: Adidas
- Key Partner: Sixt Leasing
- Other Partners: Ejjabet (Official Sponsor)

== League committees ==
The Premier Division Standing Committee (PDSC) is a body composed of the Premier League club presidents who represent their club on a board. These do not have executive powers but are a formal body that has official influence with regard to rules, regulations and issues that relate to the league. From time to time the committee makes proposals to the respective and MFA bodies for approval.

== Venues ==
Ta' Qali	Ta' Qali	Location of host stadia during the 2024-25 Maltese Premier League
Ta' Qali National Stadium	Centenary Stadium	Location of host stadia during the 2024-25 Maltese Premier League
Capacity: 16,997	Capacity: 1,732	Location of host stadia during the 2024-25 Maltese Premier League
Paola	Hamrun	Xewkija
Tony Bezzina Stadium	Victor Tedesco Stadium	Gozo Stadium
Capacity: 2,968	Capacity: 1,962	Capacity: 1,644

== Clubs ==
=== Seasons in Maltese Premier League ===
Location of Maltese clubs played in Maltese Premier League

37 teams have taken part in the Maltese Premier League since the 1945-46 season (i.e. the season that introduced promotion and relegation, and during which the MFA changed the rules of the clubs that every locality they have to represent one club) until the 2026-27 season. Hibernians F.C. is the only team that has played Maltese Premier League football every season. Teams in bold participate in the 2026-27 season.

- **81** seasons: **Hibernians F.C.**
- **80** seasons: **Floriana F.C.**, **Valletta F.C.**
- **79** seasons: **Sliema Wanderers F.C.**
- **71** seasons: **Ħamrun Spartans F.C.**
- **60** seasons: **Birkirkara F.C.**
- **28** seasons: Rabat Ajax F.C., St. George's F.C.
- **21** seasons: Naxxar Lions F.C.
- **19** seasons: **Mosta F.C.**
- **18** seasons: **Gżira United F.C.**
- **17** seasons: Marsa F.C.
- **16** seasons: Pietà Hotspurs F.C., Qormi F.C., Tarxien Rainbows F.C., Żurrieq F.C.
- **14** seasons: **Balzan F.C.**, Msida St. Joseph F.C.
- **13** seasons:**Marsaxlokk F.C.**
- **11** seasons: **Żabbar St. Patrick F.C.**, Żebbuġ Rangers F.C.
- **10** seasons: Melita F.C., St. Andrews F.C.
- **6** seasons: Senglea Athletic F.C.
- **5** seasons: Gudja United F.C., Lija Athletic F.C., Mqabba F.C., Santa Lucia F.C., Vittoriosa Stars F.C., Sirens F.C.
- **2** seasons: Pembroke Athleta F.C., Xgħajra Tornadoes F.C.
- **1** season: **Birżebbuġa St. Peter's**, Dingli Swallows F.C., Għaxaq F.C., Gozo F.C., Mellieħa S.C., Żejtun Corinthians F.C.
- Teams in italics are defunct.

== Champions ==
In total, ten clubs have won the Maltese championship, including titles in the old First Division which was replaced in 1980 by the Premier League. Of the winners, three clubs have been champions more than 20 times: Floriana (27 titles), Sliema Wanderers (26 titles) and Valletta (25 titles).

The honour of Golden Stars was introduced in football to recognize sides that have won multiple championships. In Malta, clubs are permitted to place a golden star above their crest for every ten national championships won. Sliema Wanderers, Floriana and Valletta boast two golden stars, and Hibernians and Ħamrun Spartans have one golden star placed above their crest on their jerseys.

Club	Winners	Runners-up	Third Place	Winning years
Floriana	27	14	11	1909–10, 1911–12, 1912–13, 1920–21, 1921–22, 1924–25, 1926–27, 1927–28, 1928–29, 1930–31, 1934–35, 1936–37, 1949–50, 1950–51, 1951–52, 1952–53, 1954–55, 1957–58, 1961–62, 1967–68, 1969–70, 1972–73, 1974–75, 1976–77, 1992–93, 2019–20, 2025–26
Sliema Wanderers	26	31	19	1919–20, 1922–23, 1923–24, 1925–26, 1929–30, 1932–33, 1933–34, 1935–36, 1937–38, 1938–39, 1939–40, 1948–49, 1953–54, 1955–56, 1956–57, 1963–64, 1964–65, 1965–66, 1970–71, 1971–72, 1975–76, 1988–89, 1995–96, 2002–03, 2003–04, 2004–05
Valletta	25	17	20	1914–15, 1931–32, 1944–45, 1945–46, 1947–48, 1958–59, 1959–60, 1962–63, 1973–74, 1977–78, 1979–80, 1983–84, 1989–90, 1991–92, 1996–97, 1997–98, 1998–99, 2000–01, 2007–08, 2010–11, 2011–12, 2013–14, 2015–16, 2017–18, 2018–19
Hibernians	13	14	14	1960–61, 1966–67, 1968–69, 1978–79, 1980–81, 1981–82, 1993–94, 1994–95, 2001–02, 2008–09, 2014–15, 2016–17, 2021–22
Ħamrun Spartans	11	11	14	1913–14, 1917–18, 1946–47, 1982–83, 1986–87, 1987–88, 1990–91, 2020–21, 2022–23, 2023–24, 2024–25
Birkirkara	4	10	10	1999–2000, 2005–06, 2009–10, 2012–13
Rabat Ajax	2	1	1	1984–85, 1985–86
St. George's	1	4	5	1916–17
Marsaxlokk	1	2	1	2006–07
The King's Own Malta Regiment	1	0	0	1918–19

Bold teams are currently in the Maltese Premier League.

Italic: Season Unbeaten.

== League appearances ==
Player	Matches
Mario Muscat	529
Andrew Cohen	508
**Roderick Briffa**	491
**Paul Fenech**	487
David Camilleri	484
**Clayton Failla**	470
Gilbert Agius	453
Ivan Woods	446
Brian Said	429
Tyrone Farrugia	425
Malcolm Licari	425
Stefan Sultana	424
Jeffrey Chetcuti	414
Manolito Micallef	400

Bold denotes still active players.
