= 1922–23 Maltese Premier League =

Maltese First Division
- Season: 1922–23
- Champions: Sliema Wanderers F.C. (2nd title)
- Matches played: 13
- Goals scored: 32 (2.46 per match)

The 1922–23 Maltese First Division was the 12th season of top-tier football in Malta. It was contested by 6 teams, and Sliema Wanderers F.C. won the championship.

== League standings ==
Pos	Team	Pld	W	D	L	GF	GA	GD	Pts
1	Sliema Wanderers F.C. (C)	5	5	0	0	10	1	+9	10
2	Floriana F.C.	5	4	0	1	13	1	+12	8
3	Sliema Rangers	5	2	1	2	3	5	−2	5
4	Hamrun Spartans F.C.	5	2	0	3	2	6	−4	4
5	Vittoriosa Rovers	5	1	1	3	3	9	−6	3
6	Valletta United	5	0	0	5	1	10	−9	0

Source: rsssf.com
(C) Champions

== Results ==
Home \ Away	SLW	FLO	SLR	ĦAM	VIT	VAL
Sliema Wanderers	—	1–0	3–0	4–1	2–0	3–0 (Note: Match was awarded to Sliema Wanderers with a 3–0 score)
Floriana		—	1–0	1–0	4–0	7–0
Sliema Rangers			—	1–0	1–1	1–0
Ħamrun Spartans				—	1–0	3–0 (Note: Match was awarded to Ħamrun Spartans with a 3–0 score)
Vittoriosa Rovers					—	2–1
Valletta United						—
