= 1935–36 Maltese Premier League =

Maltese First Division
- Season: 1935–36
- Champions: Sliema Wanderers F.C. (8th title)
- Matches: 6
- Highest scoring: 21

The 1935–36 Maltese First Division was the 25th season of top-tier football in Malta. It was contested by 3 teams, and Sliema Wanderers F.C. won the championship.

== Teams ==
Locations of the 1935–36 Maltese First Division teams

== League standings ==
| Pos | Team | Pld | W | D | L | GF | GA | GD | Pts |
|---|---|---|---|---|---|---|---|---|---|
| 1 | Sliema Wanderers F.C. (C) | 4 | 3 | 0 | 1 | 10 | 3 | +7 | 6 |
| 2 | Floriana F.C. | 4 | 2 | 1 | 1 | 9 | 4 | +5 | 5 |
| 3 | Hibernians F.C. | 4 | 0 | 1 | 3 | 2 | 14 | −12 | 1 |

Source: rsssf.com
(C) Champions

== Results ==
| Home \ Away | FRN | HIB | SLM |
|---|---|---|---|
| Floriana | — | 1–1 | 0–2 |
| Hibernians | 0–6 | — | 0–5 |
| Sliema Wanderers | 1–2 | 2–1 | — |

Legend: Blue = home team win; Yellow = draw; Red = away team win.
