= 1933–34 Maltese Premier League =

Maltese First Division
- Season: 1933–34
- Champions: Sliema Wanderers F.C. (7th title)
- Matches: 3
- Goals: 10 (3.33 per match)

The 1933–34 Maltese First Division was the 23rd season of top-tier football in Malta. It was contested by 2 teams, and Sliema Wanderers F.C. won the championship.

== Teams ==
Locations of the 1933–34 Maltese First Division teams

== League standings ==
Pos	Team	Pld	W	D	L	GF	GA	GD	Pts
1	Sliema Wanderers F.C. (C)	4	2	1	1	6	4	+2	5
2	Hibernians F.C.	4	1	1	2	4	6	−2	3

Source: rsssf.com
(C) Champions

== Results ==
Team 1	Agg.	Team 2	1st leg	2nd leg	3rd leg	4th leg
Sliema Wanderers	6–4	Hibernians	2–2	1–2	3–0	+:- (Note: Match was awarded to Sliema Wanderers as a goalless win.)
