= 1923–24 Maltese Premier League =

Maltese First Division
- Season: 1923–24
- Champions: Sliema Wanderers F.C. (3rd title)
- Matches played: 10
- Goals scored: 26 (2.6 per match)

The 1923–24 Maltese First Division was the 13th season of top-tier football in Malta. It was contested by 5 teams, and Sliema Wanderers F.C. won the championship.

== League standings ==
Pos	Team	Pld	W	D	L	GF	GA	GD	Pts
1	Sliema Wanderers F.C. (C)	4	4	0	0	9	1	+8	8
2	Vittoriosa Rovers	4	2	0	2	5	4	+1	4
3	Valletta United	4	2	0	2	4	4	0	4
4	Sliema Rangers	4	1	0	3	5	8	−3	2
5	Msida Rovers	4	1	0	3	3	9	−6	2

Source: rsssf.com
(C) Champions

== Results ==
Home \ Away	SLW	VIT	VAL	SLR	MSD
Sliema Wanderers	—	3–0	1–0	3–1	2–0
Vittoriosa Rovers		—	3–0	2–0	0–1
Valletta United			—	1–0	3–0
Sliema Rangers				—	4–2
Msida Rovers					—
