= Challenge League =

Challenge League may refer to:

- Challenge League (Japan), the third-level women's association football league in Japan 2015–2020
- Swiss Challenge League, the second highest tier of the Swiss Football League
- V.Challenge League, the second-level volleyball league for both men and women in Japan
- Maltese Challenge League, the second highest tier of the Maltese Football League
