= The King's Own Malta Regiment =

British Army colonial regiment (1801–1972)

King's Own Malta Regiment
- Founded: 1932
- Disbanded: 1972
- Service branches: 1st Battalion; 2nd Battalion; 3rd Battalion; 10th Battalion
- Headquarters: Valletta

Leadership
- Chief of Defence: Lieutenant-Colonel Percy Worrall

Personnel
- Military age: 18 years of age
- Conscription: Voluntary

Industry
- Foreign suppliers: United Kingdom; United States

Related articles
- History: Military history of Malta

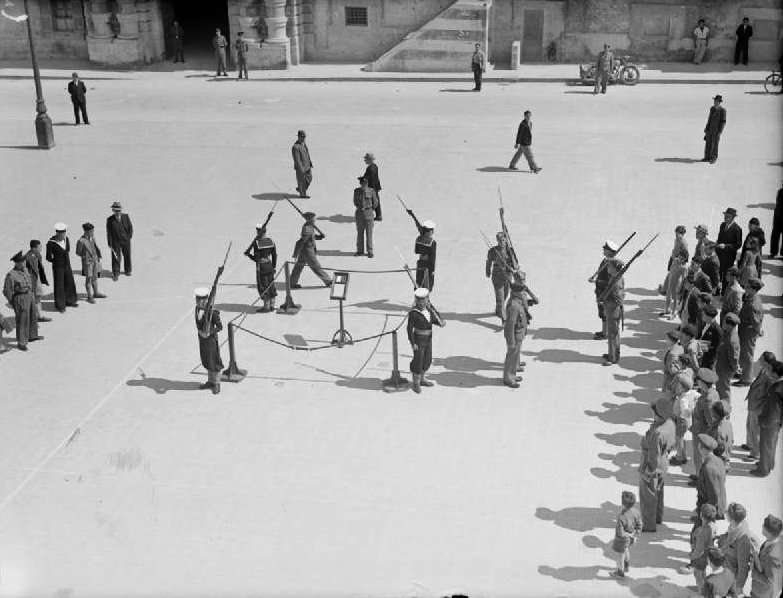
Maltese ratings changing guard with the King's Own Malta Regiment

The King's Own Malta Regiment was a territorial infantry regiment on the British Army colonial list prior to Malta's independence. It was formed in 1801 as the "Regiment of Maltese Militia", existing only until the following year. It was reformed as the "Maltese Militia" by Sir Adrian Dingli in 1852 before disbanding again in 1857. It was raised again, this time as the "Royal Malta Regiment of Militia" in 1889; this regiment was considered to be the successor to the "Maltese Chasseurs" of the early 19th century. The regiment was renamed the "King's Own Royal Malta Regiment of Militia" in 1903, and was disbanded in 1921. The regiment was raised for a fourth time in 1931 as the "King's Own Malta Regiment". Initially on the British Establishment, in 1951 it was transferred to the Malta Territorial Force before becoming part of the Malta Land Force on Malta's independence in 1964. The regiment was disbanded in 1972.

== History ==
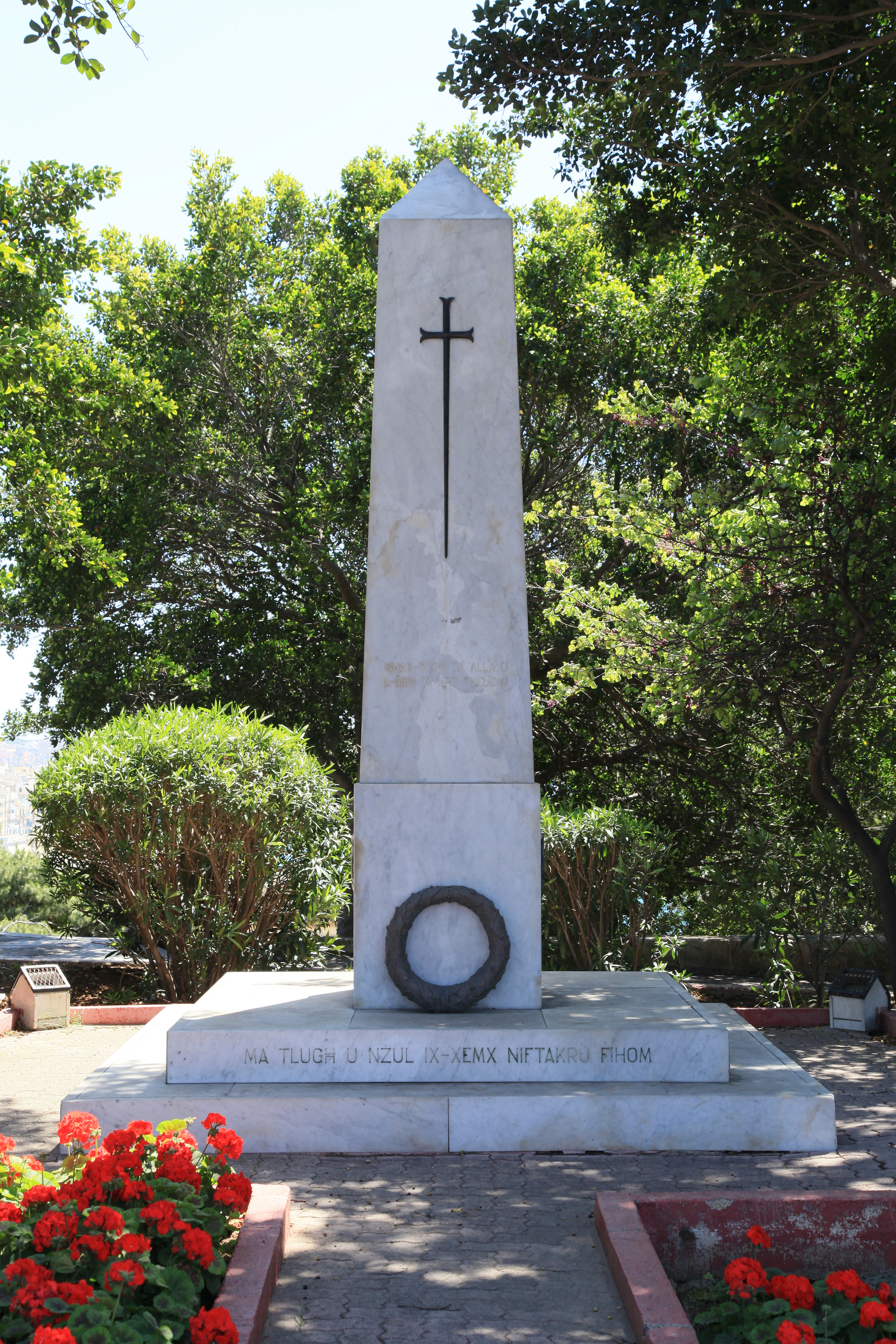
KOMR Memorial in Floriana

The K.O.M.R. was formed as a Territorial Infantry Regiment in 1932, the latest in a series of locally raised militia units and regiments dating back to the 1800s.

Its immediate predecessor was the Royal Malta Regiment of Militia, established in 1889. The opportunity to have the name changed to a more prestigious ‘King's Own’ presented itself and was eagerly snapped up in 1903, when during a Royal Visit, King Edward VII referred to the RMRM as “My Regiment”.

During the Second World War the Regiment was expanded to four battalions, 1st, 2nd, 3rd, and 10th, and all rendered sterling service. The infantrymen were constantly trained in fighting tactics, weapon training and anti-invasion drills, to prepare against the largest threat to Malta, Operation Herkules, the planned German-Italian invasion.

The main task of the 2nd Battalion, was the defence of the shores of Malta. This was carried out mainly by the manning of pill boxes, and generally one depth post and two beach posts were allocated to a platoon of 30 men. Constant patrols along the shoreline were carried out to foil any Commando-style operation the enemy might try to carry out.

The infantrymen were often called upon to speed up the unloading of vital cargoes from convoy ships, before the ships were bombed and sunk in port. So essential were the supplies that unloading would not stop, not even during air raids. Afterwards the supply dumps, where all these supplies were stored, sometimes in the open, would need guarding round the clock.

The Regiment also put to good use their Vickers, Lewis and Bren machine guns to provide defence against low flying aircraft, especially those strafing the airfields.

As the few RAF fighter planes available would be scrambled to engage the enemy bombers, and since the prime targets were the airfields, the bomb craters would have to be filled in and passed over with a roller to allow the defending fighters to land again before they ran out of fuel. Other jobs were the re-arming and refueling of planes, as well as the building of protective pens for the aircraft to minimize bomb shrapnel damage as much as possible.

The KOMR was frequently called upon to perform unenviable tasks such as when in January 1941, after the Germans tried to sink the Illustrious in port with determined and ferocious bombing, they were sent to rescue the living and remove the dead from the devastated Cottonera area of the Grand Harbour.

As tribute to the hardships endured during the war, the KOMR contingent for the London Victory Parade was the only regiment permitted to carry its Regimental Colours. The Colours of all the other regiments were carried massed together. The Regiment was given the battle honour “Malta 1940 - 1942” and Queen Elizabeth II also granted the regiment the unique privilege of carrying the George Cross on the Regimental Colours. The Regiment was disbanded in 1972.

== Uniforms and equipment ==
Make	Origin	Type
Khaki drill	United Kingdom	Summer uniform
Battle dress	United Kingdom	Winter uniform
Side cap	United Kingdom	Headgear
Brodie helmet	United Kingdom	Helmet
1937 pattern web equipment	United Kingdom	Webbing

Most, if not all units stationed in Malta during World War II including the King's Own Malta Regiment had adopted a unique camouflage pattern on their helmets. This pattern attempted to replicate the rubble walls that are still commonly used to separate fields and properties in Malta. It was also applied to vehicles, bunkers and anti-aircraft guns.

== Small arms ==
Make	Origin	Type
Lee–Enfield (Mk III)	United Kingdom	Bolt-action rifle
Webley revolver	Britain	Service revolver
Bren light machine gun	United Kingdom; Czechoslovakia	Light machine gun
Thompson submachine gun	United States	Submachine gun
Sten	United Kingdom	Submachine gun
