= Three Cities (Malta) =

Group of fortified cities in Malta

Coordinates: 35°52′37″N 14°31′19″E

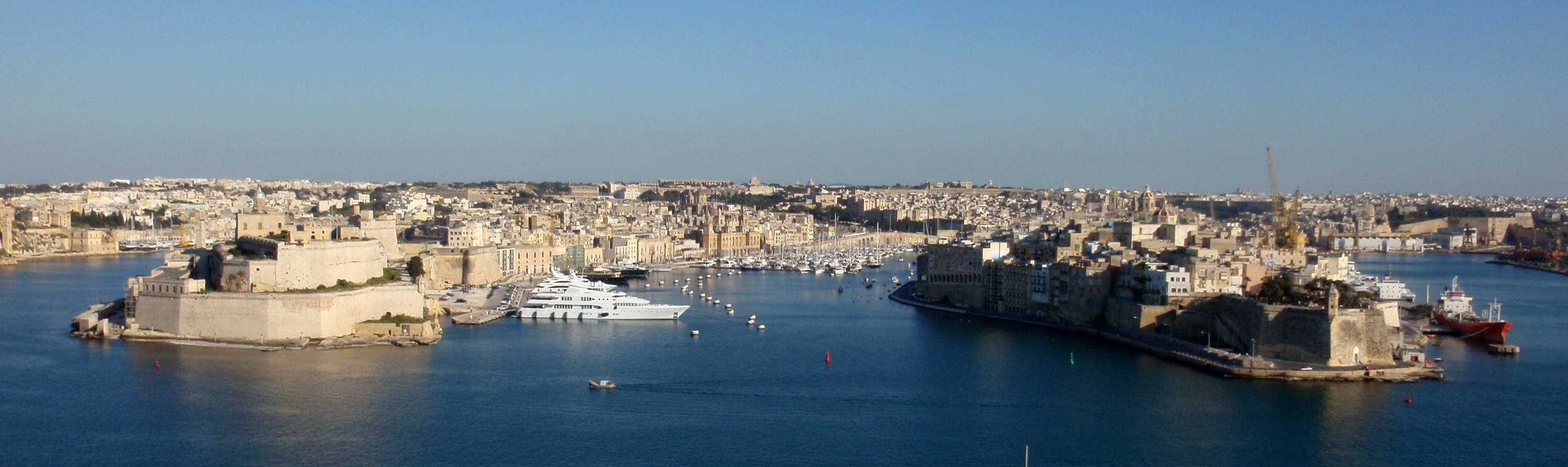
View of the Three Cities from Valletta

The Three Cities (Maltese: It-Tlett Ibliet) is a collective description of the three fortified cities of Vittoriosa, Senglea and Cospicua in Malta. The oldest of the Three Cities is Vittoriosa, which has existed since prior to the Middle Ages. The other two cities, Senglea and Cospicua, were both founded by the Order of Saint John in the 16th and 17th centuries. The Three Cities are enclosed by the Cottonera Lines, along with several other fortifications. The term Cottonera (Maltese: Il-Kottonera) is synonymous with the Three Cities, although it is sometimes taken to also include the nearby town of Kalkara.

Together, the Three Cities have a total population of 10,808 people as of March 2014.

Some inhabitants speak the Cottonera Dialect, most common among locals.

Laconic Name	Official name
Birgu	Vittoriosa
L-Isla	Senglea
Bormla	Cospicua

== History ==
Vittoriosa has been settled since the time of the Phoenicians, but the current city dates back from the time of the Order of Saint John. Vittoriosa was chosen as the capital city of Malta instead of Mdina upon the arrival of the Order in 1530. After the 1551 attack, Senglea was built on the peninsula known as L'Isola. In Vittoriosa, Fort Saint Angelo was built on the site of the ancient Castrum Maris, and Fort Saint Michael was built on Senglea.

The cities were besieged during the Great Siege of Malta of 1565, and after the siege was lifted Vittoriosa was given the title of Città Vittoriosa and Senglea the title of Città Invicta. In the aftermath of the siege, the city of Valletta was built, and in 1571 the new city became the capital instead of Vittoriosa. The cities' fortifications were strengthened during the reign of Grandmaster Nicolas Cotoner, and in 1722, Grandmaster Marc'Antonio Zondadari gave the town of Bormla the title of Città Cospicua.

The Cottonera lines or rather Civitas Cotonera was intended as a city surrounded by fortifications. These impressive fortifications were built according to the plan of Antonio Maurizio Valperga on four of the five hills of Bormla. Originally intended as a much larger defense system which would encompass the Corradino hill and extend over Kalkara to Ricasoli, the final plan intended for the Citta Cottonera to be a city with the fort St. Margerita as a citadel at its centre. The beginning to construction began on 28 August 1670 with great solemnity as follows: 'On that day a general procession of all the regular orders walked from the Parish Church of Burmula, led by the prior of the convent church, who held the famous relic of St. John, glorious protector of the Holy Religion followed by the Grand Master, all the knights and a lot of citizens walked towards the hill, where the bastion of S. Niccolo was planned; here and there, with the usual ceremonies, and blessings, the Grand Master Fra Nicola Cotoner cast various coins bearing his and the city’s mark within the foundations of the wall, as also did the Knights of the Grand Cross while they invoked the Divine help. The foundation stone was laid with the firing of the guns of all the fortresses.' The six kilometre fortification encircles Bormla with a series of bastions and triumphal baroque gateways.

A detail from the cartouche by Albert Clouet of the Civitas Cotonera, shows a central castle or fort; the Fort Santa Margerita surrounded by the present day Cottonera lines with new buildings, palaces and gardens with the Dockyard Creek and most importantly, it shows Bormla forming an essential part of Civitas Cotonera. These areas in Bormla within Clouet's cartouche were and are still spread over 3 areas in present-day Bormla; the lower Santa Margerita area, the Verdala/St. Helen's area and the Dock No. 1/St.Paul's area. Albert Clouet's cartouche excludes the peninsulas of the two neighbouring cities, so it is quite evident that neither Vittoriosa nor Senglea were ever intended to form part of Civitas Cotonera. With the death of Grand Master Cotoner critics of the design discontinued work claiming that it would not withstand a siege. Numerous people of note have affirmed this claim and have even gone as far as to say that the Cottonera lines are not siege proven. The blockade by the British and the Maltese uprising against the French who had to defend their position by locking themselves within the Cottonera lines for well over a year should be sufficient proof that these claims are spurious. With the discontinuation of work on the Civitas Cotonera, the Fort St. Margarita continued with different redesigns by various Grand Masters to its present appearance as a line of bastions.

It is safe to say that by the 1670, the fortifications of Vittoriosa (Vittoriosa) and Senglea were grossly outdated so the building of the Cottonera fortifications during the reign of Grandmaster Nicolas Cotoner were intended to protect the harbour and Valletta from the landward side against possible attacks by the Ottomans landing at Marsaxlokk.

Bormla's ancient name of Burmula has been defined as Phoenician or Punic which indicates this city's ancient origins. In his book Notizie Storiche Sull' Etimologia Dei Nomi, Achille Ferris explains that ‘Burmula’ is made up of the words ‘Bur’ and ‘Mula’; ‘Bur’ for ‘place’ and ‘Mula’ for ‘high’; an eminent place. Bormla’s domination in height over the surrounding areas tends to corroborate this version. In the book Della lingua punica presentemente usata da maltesi &c, Giovanni Pietro Francesco Agius de Soldanis refers to the t'Ghuxa area in Bormla and the ancient name of Burmula itself as proof that these have Punic origins. The meaning of these words in themselves indicate that Burmula was regarded as an eminent place that stands out - a conspicuous place hence the term 'Cospicua' is as ancient as the name 'Burmula' because it is a direct translation of the site's Phoenician name. It is said that in 1722 on seeing the Bormla's eminence and double line of fortifications that surround it, Grand Master Marc'Antonio Zondadari, honoured the town by proclaiming it as a city, hence the term: Città Cospicua - The Conspicuous City.

During World War II, the Three Cities were heavily bombed by the Italians and Germans, and they were rebuilt in the 1950s and 1960s. Many people from the educated and professional classes moved out of the Cottonera area after the war, and the cities were subsequently repopulated by people from the working class. The area subsequently had higher levels of illiteracy, unemployment and people on welfare when compared to the rest of Malta. Since the 1990s, several regeneration projects have been carried out, including the establishment of the Malta Maritime Museum in Vittoriosa and the American University of Malta in Cospicua.

== See also ==
- Three Villages
