= Floriana F.C. =

Floriana
- Full name: Floriana Football Club
- Nicknames: Tal-Irish, Il-Greens
- Founded: 1894; 132 years ago
- Ground: Various
- Manager: Carlos Alós
- League: Maltese Premier League
- 2025–26: Maltese Premier League, 1st of 12 (champions)
- Website: https://florianafootballclub.com/
Home colours	Away colours

Floriana Football Club is a Maltese professional football club based in the town of Floriana that currently plays in the Maltese Premier League. Considered one of the most supported and successful clubs in Maltese football, Floriana has won 27 national league titles (Maltese record) and 21 FA trophies. It is also the only team from Malta to have qualified from the qualifying rounds to the first round proper of the UEFA Champions League, in the 1993–94 season.

== History ==
Floriana Football Club was founded in 1894 with the inauguration of the football ground officiated by Queen Alexandra. The site was a cricket ground from 1890 until it was converted for football use. Together with St. George's FC, it is one of the two oldest clubs in Malta. During that period, football in Malta was introduced by the British Servicemen who were stationed on the island, which was then a colony of the British Empire.

The club is affiliated to the Malta Football Association which in turn is a member of both UEFA and FIFA. The team's colours were green and red but after a friendly match against the Royal Dublin Fusiliers which played in green and white, Floriana FC changed its colours to green and white. The team's nicknames are: Tal-Irish and Greens.

Floriana Football Club has won the major Maltese League championship 27 times and the FA Trophy 20 times.

=== Formation ===
Football was introduced in Malta at the end of the 19th century by the British troops stationed on the island. At that time Malta formed part of the British Empire and, the Island was the base of British forces in the heart of the Mediterranean. The forces' barracks, which were strategically located around the island of Malta, enjoyed large areas that were used as parade grounds, training areas and for sporting activities.

The sports practised by the soldiers were mainly cricket, hockey and football. The British forces in Malta were mainly stationed in Floriana, Cospicua, Mtarfa, Marsa and Sliema. The locals who were influenced by the soldiers stationed in the area were introduced to these sporting activities. The most popular sport amongst the residents of Floriana was football, however some also practised cricket and hockey. Floriana still has its hockey club, carrying the name Floriana Young Stars Hockey Club.

=== Club colours and mascot ===
Between 1894 and 1905 the club's colours were green/red quartered shirts, black shorts with green and red socks. The official colours of the club as we know them today, green and white vertical striped shirts, white shorts and green/white horizontal striped socks, were introduced in 1905. At that time the Royal Dublin Fusiliers were stationed in Floriana. During that year, three friendly matches were held between this regiment and FFC. At the end of the final match both teams exchanged their shirts and later the FFC changed their official colours to their green and white shirts. The regiment left the Island for India in that same year. The ties between Floriana and the Royal Dublin Fusiliers were so strong that the people hailing from Floriana were nicknamed after the Irish, "Tal-Irish".

The club's mascot is the lion, which features prominently on the club's badge since 1936 together with the Latin motto "Ex Ludis Virtus", meaning "virtue out of the game". In this regard the club's badge represents the fierceness of the lion together with the virtues of sportsmanship. The lion was chosen as the club's mascot for two general reasons attributed to history of Floriana.

First attribution is to the coat-of-arms of the Grandmaster of Order of St. John, Manoel de Vilhena, which has the lion on it. Vilhena was the mastermind behind the construction of a fortification suburg of Floriana (originally known as Borgo Vilhena) to defend the capital city of Valletta from land attacks. He even ordered the construction of a lion statue fountain, with his Grandmaster coat of arms being held by the lions hand, in the centre of Floriana's main square, St. Anne Square, which is still there today.

Second attribution to the lion is the statue of St. Publius who is the patron saint of Floriana. The St. Publius' statue has a lion with it which shows how Publius was killed for his Christian preachings.

The first game won by the team was confirmed on the feast of the patron's village St. Publius, on 13 April 1910, which is to some considered a divine confirmation.

=== 2020 Win and COVID-19 national outrage ===
On 25 May 2020 Floriana FC were crowned champions of the BOV Premier League for the 26th title in their history and their first in 27 years, following a shortened season by a legal notice from the health authority in Malta to stop all contact sports on the Island because of the COVID-19 pandemic. In June 2020 a vote was taken in the MFA Counsel and declared all those on top of the table in all participating divisions will be declared champions. Due to the COVID-19 pandemic, the season was ultimately stopped earlier and Floriana was crowned champions of the league.

Celebrations were then hosted in the Fosos in Floriana, where a mass gathering of supporters broke social distancing rules and broke several Maltese laws by not staying in groups of six of less. The event sparked national outrage within the public in Malta and was featured on nearly all Maltese national newspapers.

=== Domestic successes ===
Since the foundation of the Malta Football Association, in 1909, (fiv)and local competitions the club won a total of 108 honours, which includes 27 league titles and 25 Cup knock out competitions. The club has also achieved a number of impressive feats, such as four consecutive league championships, ten doubles (League plus Cup) and a League title with maximum points.

=== UEFA competitions ===
Over the years FFC participated in the various competitions organised by the European football body, UEFA, such as the:

- UEFA Champions League
- UEFA Cup Winners' Cup
- Fairs Cities' Cup
- UEFA Europa League
- Intertoto Cup

In 1962, the club was the first to represent Malta in UEFA competitions in its Cup Winners' Cup against the Hungarian side Ujpest Dozsa. Over the years, FFC had the opportunity to meet some renowned European football clubs, including the likes of:

- (England) Ipswich Town
- (Italy) Inter Milan
- (Netherlands) Sparta Rotterdam
- (Greece) Panathinaikos
- (Hungary) Ferencváros
- (Scotland) Dundee United
- (Portugal) FC Porto
- (Germany) Borussia Dortmund
- (Socialist Federal Republic of Yugoslavia) Hajduk Split
- (Serbia) Red Star Belgrade
- (Republic of Ireland) Shamrock Rovers

On two occasions FFC made it to the next round, 1993–94 Champions Cup and Intertoto Cup 1999–00.

=== Youth sector ===
In 1987 the club founded its youth sector, Floriana FC Nursery (FFCN), which is affiliated to the Malta Youth Football Association. The club's youth sector may also be considered one of the most successful organisations of its type on the Island; not only has it produced a number of some of the finest footballers, but it has also won a number of league titles organised by the Association. The following are some of the major honours won by FFCN:

06 / 07 UNDER 14 Knock out competition

- U/14 League Champions – twice
- U/16 League Champions – six times, four of which in a row, 1993 to 1997
- U/18 League Champions – six times, four of which in a row, 1996 to 2000

Today all the major six Premiership clubs in Malta have at least two players forming part of their squad, which have been raised by the Floriana Youth Nursery.

=== Rivalries ===
During their history Floriana has had three main rivals, these being St. George's FC, Sliema Wanderers and neighbors Valletta. The rivalry against St. George's started from the beginnings of football in Malta circa 1890, before the rivalry with Sliema Wanderers FC developed (now referred to as the old firm rivalry).This rivalry peaked from 1922 onwards and lasted until the late 1970s, during which time both sides dominated the Maltese football scene. Football hooliganism and direct conflicts between supporters were something usual.

For some time the rivalry has declined. In 2016/17 Floriana won their 20th FA Trophy against Sliema. This re-ignited the rivalry between both clubs, as Floriana won 9 finals in this cup competition against the Blues. However, since that final, the rivalry sparked again after a few years forward floriana won the FA trophy for the 21st time vs Valletta thus shared the record with the blues, the only 2 teams winning it for twenty-one times. Moving forward, after seven years in the 2023/24 season the two giants of the maltese football met again for the FA Trophy final where Sliema secured a record of winning the title for the 22nd time; making Sliema the most successful football club in Malta with 118 major domestic trophies

The rivalry against Valletta is still alive, and is now considered the biggest fixture in the Maltese Premier League and one of the most classic derbies in Maltese football. The rivalry stems from the close proximity of the two localities they represent, as well as the history and success of both clubs. The matches between the two sides often attract crowds of people.

== Players ==
=== Current squad ===
As of 19 August 2026

Note: Flags indicate national team as defined under FIFA eligibility rules; some limited exceptions apply. Players may hold more than one non-FIFA nationality.

No.	Pos.	Nation	Player
3	DF	MLT	Myles Beerman
4	DF	BRA	Kauan
5	MF	MLT	Gerrard Rodgers
6	DF	BIH	Amar Drina
8	MF	MLT	Zachary Scerri
9	FW	BIH	Kenan Dervišagić
10	MF	ARG	Federico Varela
11	MF	CRO	Robert Murić
12	MF	MLT	Dunstan Vella
14	MF	BIH	Alen Kurtalić
16	MF	ARG	Chapi Romano

No.	Pos.	Nation	Player
17	DF	MLT	Owen Spiteri
19	FW	GAM	Mustapha Jah
21	DF	MLT	Carlo Zammit Lonardelli
22	FW	CRO	Tomislav Gudelj
23	GK	BRA	Guilherme Cioletti
28	MF	MLT	Paul Mbong
37	GK	MLT	Reece Cutajar
70	FW	MLT	Matthia Veselji
80	GK	ESP	Pablo Picón
86	DF	MLT	Nikita Shchepetkin
88	FW	CIV	Ange N`Dri

=== Out on loan ===
Note: Flags indicate national team as defined under FIFA eligibility rules; some limited exceptions apply. Players may hold more than one non-FIFA nationality.

No. / Pos. / Nation / Player	No. / Pos. / Nation / Player

== Non-playing staff ==
=== Administration ===
Position	Name
President	Johann Said
Senior Vice President	Raymond Vella
Vice President & Assistant Secretary	Anton Vella
Secretary & 1st MFA Delegate	Dr Jacques Grima
Treasurer	Mark Edward Galea
Head of PR & Communications	Kelly Cesare
Sports Director	Jean Paul Desira
Head of Operations & FYD	liam Fenech
Head of Player Welfare & Logistics	Amanda Borg
Head of Media & Digital Content	Justin Muscat
Head of Supporters	Omar Aquilina
Head of Club Projects & Club Affairs	Nigel Holland

== Historical list of coaches ==
- (England) Ted Phillips (1966-67)
- (Malta) Lolly Borg (1968-73)
- (Malta) Hugh Caruana (1973-74)
- (Malta) Tony Formosa (1975-81)
- (Malta) Hugh Caruana (1988-89)
- (Malta) Lolly Aquilina (1990-92)
- (England) Mark Miller (1992-94)
- (Malta) George Busuttil (1994)
- (Serbia and Montenegro) Dragan Novčić (1995)
- (England) Ron Fenton (1995-97)
- (Serbia and Montenegro) Vlada Pejović (1997-98)
- (Bulgaria) Traiko Sokolov (1998)
- (Malta) Eric Schembri (1999)
- (Bulgaria) Traiko Sokolov & (England) Mark Miller (1999-00)
- (New Zealand) Kim Wright (2000)
- (Morocco) Karim Bencherifa (1 Jul 2000-30 June 02)
- (Bosnia and Herzegovina) Zijad Švrakić (2002-04)
- (Malta) Willie Vassallo (2004-05)
- (Malta) Jimmy Briffa (2005-06)
- (Malta) Joseph Grech (2006-07)
- (Serbia) Danilo Dončić (1 Jul 2007-30 Jun 08)
- (Serbia) Zoran Popović (1 Jul 2008-9 Jan 09)
- (Brazil) Antonio Carlos Vieira (1 Jul 2008-24 March 09)
- (Republic of Ireland) Roddy Collins (1 Jul 2009-15 Dec 09)
- (Serbia) Zoran Popović (2009-10)
- (Bulgaria) Todor Raykov (1 Jul 2010-21 Feb 11)
- (Malta) Michael Woods (2010-12)
- (Malta) Joe Brincat (20 Mar 2012-12)
- (England) Mark Wright (18 Aug 2012-18 Oct 12)
- (Malta) Stephen Azzopardi (18 Oct 2012-25 Jan 13)
- (England) Iain Brunskill (29 Jan 2013-8 May 13)
- (England) Ian Dawes (9 May 2013-8 Apr 14)
- (Italy) Giovanni Tedesco (8 Apr 2014-8 May 15)
- (Belgium) Luis Oliveira (14 Jun 2015-8 May 16)
- (Italy) Giovanni Tedesco (15 Jun 2016-4 Dec 17)
- (Argentina) Nicolás Chiesa (15 Dec 2017-27 Aug 18)
- (Belgium) Luis Oliveira (28 Aug 2018-14 Nov 18)
- (Italy) Guido Ugolotti (14 Nov 2018-15 May 19)
- (Italy) Vincenzo Potenza (15 May 2019-23 Dec 20)
- | (Malta) John Buttigieg (26 Dec 2020-11 Feb 21)
- (Malta) Darren Vella (11 Feb 2021-16 Feb 21)
- (Italy) Vincenzo Potenza (16 Feb 2021-14 Jun 21)
- (Italy) Gianluca Atzori (17 Jun 202110 May 23)
- (Italy) Mauro Camoranesi (5 Jun 2023-15 May 24)
- (Malta) Darren Abdilla (20 May 2024-14 May 25)
- (Portugal) Daniel Portela (1 Jul 2025-)

== Honours ==
- Maltese Premier League
  - Champions (27): 1909–10, 1911–12, 1912–13, 1920–21, 1921–22, 1924–25, 1926–27, 1927–28, 1928–29, 1930–31, 1934–35, 1936–37, 1949–50, 1950–51, 1951–52, 1952–53, 1954–55, 1957–58, 1961–62, 1967–68, 1969–70, 1972–73, 1974–75, 1976–77, 1992–93, 2019–20, 2025–26
  - Runners-up (14): 1922–23, 1925–26, 1935–36, 1937–38, 1953–54, 1955–56, 1965–66, 1968–69, 1971–72, 1975–76, 1991–92, 1993–94, 2010–11, 2023–24
- Maltese FA Trophy
  - Champions (21): 1937–38, 1944–45, 1946–47, 1948–49, 1949–50, 1952–53, 1953–54, 1954–55, 1956–57, 1957–58, 1960–61, 1965–66, 1966–67, 1971–72, 1975–76, 1980–81, 1992–93, 1993–94, 2010–11, 2016–17, 2021–22
  - Runners-up (13): 1934–35, 1935–36, 1955–56, 1959–60, 1964–65, 1973–74, 1976–77, 1977–78, 1978–79, 1987–88, 1988–89, 2005–06, 2023–24
- Maltese Super Cup
  - Champions (2): 1993, 2017
  - Runners-up (3): 1994, 2011, 2022
- Maltese First Division
  - Champions (1): 1985–86
- Cassar Cup
  - Winners (10): 1920–21, 1922–23, 1935–36, 1936–37, 1949–50, 1951–52, 1952–53, 1953–54, 1957–58, 1960–61
- Independence Cup
  - Winners (7): 1966–67, 1968–69, 1972–73, 1975–76, 1976–77, 1977–78, 1978–79
- Sons of Malta Cup
  - Winners (6): 1967–68, 1968–69, 1973–74, 1975–76, 1976–77, 1977–78
- Super Five Tournament
  - Winners (4): 1993–94, 1994–95, 1995–96, 1997–98
- Cousis Shield
  - Winners (3): 1921–22, 1922–23, 1930–31
- Scicluna Cup
  - Winners (3): 1958–59, 1961–62, 1962–63
- Testaferrata Cup
  - Winners (3): 1975–76, 1976–77, 1977–78
- Christmas Cup
  - Winners (2): 1968–69, 1969–70
- National Ground Cup
  - Winners (1): 1910–11
- Gaelic Cup
  - Winners (1): 1912–13
- Meme Scicluna Cup
  - Winners (1): 1927–28
- Empire Sports Ground Cup
  - Winners (1): 1928–29
- Schembri Shield
  - Winners (3): 1952–53, 1953–54, 1954–55
- Malta Playing Field Association Shield
  - Winners (2): 1951–52, 1953–54
- Lowenbrau Cup
  - Winners (1): 1993–94

== European record ==
=== Matches ===
Season	Competition	Round	Club	Home	Away	Aggregate
1961–62	European Cup Winners' Cup	Preliminary round	(Hungary) Újpest	2–5	2–10	4–15
1962–63	European Cup	Preliminary round	(England) Ipswich Town	1–4	0–10	1–14
1965–66	European Cup Winners' Cup	First round	(West Germany) Borussia Dortmund	1–5	0–8	1–13
1966–67	European Cup Winners' Cup	First round	(Netherlands) Sparta Rotterdam	1–1	0–6	1–7
1967–68	European Cup Winners' Cup	First round	(Netherlands) NAC Breda	1–2	0–1	1–3
1968–69	European Cup	First round	(Finland) Lahti	1–1	0–2	1–3
1969–70	Inter-Cities Fairs Cup	First round	(Romania) Dinamo Bacău	0–1	0–6	0–7
1970–71	European Cup	First round	(Portugal) Sporting CP	0–4	0–5	0–9
1972–73	European Cup Winners' Cup	First round	(Hungary) Ferencvárosi	1–0	0–6	1–6
1973–74	European Cup	First round	(Belgium) Club Brugge	0–2	0–8	0–10
1975–76	European Cup	First round	(Socialist Federal Republic of Yugoslavia) Hajduk Split	0–5	0–3	0–8
1976–77	European Cup Winners' Cup	First round	(Poland) Śląsk Wrocław	1–4	0–2	1–6
1977–78	European Cup	First round	(Greece) Panathinaikos	1–1	0–4	1–5
1978–79	European Cup Winners' Cup	First round	(Italy) Internazionale	1–3	0–5	1–8
1981–82	European Cup Winners' Cup	First round	(Belgium) Standard Liège	1–3	0–9	1–12
1988–89	European Cup Winners' Cup	First round	(Scotland) Dundee United	0–0	0–1	0–1
1991–92	UEFA Cup	First round	(Switzerland) Neuchâtel Xamax	0–0	0–2	0–2
1992–93	UEFA Cup	First round	(Germany) Borussia Dortmund	0–1	2–7	2–8
1993–94	UEFA Champions League	Preliminary round	(Lithuania) Ekranas	1–0	1–0	2–0
1993–94	UEFA Champions League	First round	(Portugal) Porto	0–0	0–2	0–2
1994–95	UEFA Cup Winners' Cup	Qualifying round	(Republic of Ireland) Sligo Rovers	2–2	0–1	2–3
1995	UEFA Intertoto Cup	Group 11	(Austria) Tirol Innsbruck	0–4	—N/a	5th
1995	UEFA Intertoto Cup	Group 11	(Israel) Hapoel Petah Tikva	—N/a	1–1	5th
1995	UEFA Intertoto Cup	Group 11	(France) Strasbourg	0–4	—N/a	5th
1995	UEFA Intertoto Cup	Group 11	(Turkey) Gençlerbirliği	—N/a	0–3	5th
1996–97	UEFA Cup	Preliminary round	(Israel) Beitar Jerusalem	1–5	1–3	2–8
1997	UEFA Intertoto Cup	Group 12	(Austria) SV Ried	1–2	—N/a	5th
1997	UEFA Intertoto Cup	Group 12	(Georgia (country)) Tbilisi	—N/a	0–5	5th
1997	UEFA Intertoto Cup	Group 12	(Russia) Torpedo Moscow	0–1	—N/a	5th
1997	UEFA Intertoto Cup	Group 12	(Greece) Iraklis	—N/a	0–1	5th
1999	UEFA Intertoto Cup	First round	(Wales) Aberystwyth Town	2–1	2–2	4–3
1999	UEFA Intertoto Cup	Second round	(Finland) Jokerit	1–1	1–2	2–3
2000	UEFA Intertoto Cup	First round	(Norway) Stabæk	1–1	0–2	1–3
2011–12	Europa League	Second qualifying round	(Cyprus) AEK Larnaca	0–8	0–1	0–9
2012–13	Europa League	First qualifying round	(Sweden) Elfsborg	0–4	0–8	0–12
2017–18	UEFA Europa League	First qualifying round	(Serbia) Red Star Belgrade	3–3	0–3	3–6
2020–21	UEFA Champions League	First qualifying round	(Romania) CFR Cluj	0–2	—N/a	—N/a
2020–21	UEFA Europa League	Second qualifying round	(Northern Ireland) Linfield	—N/a	1–0	—N/a
2020–21	UEFA Europa League	Third qualifying round	(Estonia) Flora	0–0 (2–4 p)	—N/a	—N/a
2022–23	UEFA Europa Conference League	First qualifying round	(Moldova) Petrocub Hîncești	0–0	0–1	0–1
2024–25	UEFA Conference League	First qualifying round	(San Marino) Tre Penne	3–1	1−1	4−2
2024–25	UEFA Conference League	Second qualifying round	(Portugal) Vitória de Guimarães	0−1	0−4	0−5
2025–26	UEFA Conference League	First qualifying round	(Wales) Haverfordwest County	2–1	3–2	5–3
2025–26	UEFA Conference League	Second qualifying round	(Kosovo) Ballkani	2–4	1–1	3–5
2026–27	UEFA Champions League	First qualifying round	(Republic of Ireland) Shamrock Rovers	2–0	1−5	3−5
2026–27	UEFA Conference League	Second qualifying round	(Kosovo) Drita	1–1	1–2 (a.e.t.)	2–3

== League and cup history ==
Season	League									Top scorer		Cup	Youths		
Season	Div.	Pos.	Pl.	W	D	L	GS	GA	P	Name	Goals	Cup	Sect.	Pos.	Cup
2000–2001	1st	5th	28	13	4	11	54	48	27	(Democratic Republic of the Congo) Rufin Oba	12	SF	A	3rd	RU
2001–2002	1st	5th	28	10	6	12	39	38	25	(Brazil) Eduardo 'Bizu' Do Nascimento	9	R2	A	1st	SF
2002–2003	1st	8th	24	8	6	10	32	34	20	(Georgia (country)) Grigol Gvazava (Malta) Nicolò Baldacchino	6	SF	A	1st	R1
2003–2004	1st	6th	28	8	7	13	41	51	18	(Brazil) Eduardo 'Bizu' Do Nascimento (Malta) Nicolò Baldacchino	8	QF	A	2nd	W
2004–2005	1st	6th	28	7	7	14	28	39	16	(Malta) Nicolò Baldacchino	6	QF	A	4th	SF
2005–2006	1st	7th	24	6	9	9	36	37	18	(Malta) Adrian Mifsud	15	RU	A	6th	QF
2006–2007	1st	7th	24	9	7	8	41	30	22	(Malta) Adrian Mifsud	9	R1	A	5th	QF
2007–2008	1st	5th	28	10	6	12	40	42	22	(Malta) Ryan Darmanin	10	SF	A	6th	QF
2008–2009	1st	6th	28	7	6	15	25	44	16	(Malta) Ryan Darmanin	10	QF	A	8th	RP
2009–2010	1st	7th	24	10	6	8	35	41	25	(Malta) Ryan Darmanin	17	R2	A	4th	RU
2010–2011	1st	2nd	28	14	5	9	46	32	34	(Nigeria) Daniel Nwoke	13	W	A	4th	SF
2011–2012	1st	4th	32	16	6	10	47	35	33	(Malta) Christian Caruana (Sweden) Andre Grabowski	7	QF	A	5th	SF
2012–2013	1st	7th	32	14	10	8	48	38	38	(Brazil) Igor Coronado	13	R4	A	7th	R2
2013–2014	1st	7th	32	14	5	13	50	48	30	(Brazil) Igor Coronado	14	R4	A	9th	R2
2014–2015	1st	5th	33	13	11	9	58	51	36	(Italy) Matteo Piciollo	14	R4	B	7th	R3
2015–2016	1st	5th	33	18	4	11	60	42	39	(Italy) Mario Fontanella	20	QF	B	4th	SF
2016–2017	1st	5th	33	15	9	9	51	37	54	(Italy) Mario Fontanella	14	W	B	7th	R2
2017–2018	1st	5th	26	12	10	4	48	18	46	(Italy) Mario Fontanella	17	R3	B	9th	QF
2018–2019	1st	8th	26	9	5	12	28	25	32	(Brazil) Arthur Oyama	5	R3	C	4th	R3
2019–2020	1st	W	20	12	5	3	38	15	37	(Brazil) Tiago Adan	8	R3	C	4th	R3
2020–2021	1st	12th	23	7	6	10	26	34	27	(Albania) Kristian Keqi	5	QF	C	4th	QF
2021–2022	1st	2nd	16	8	6	2	24	13	30	(Romania) Andrei Ciolacu	4	R3	?	4th	
2022–2023		8th	26	10	7	9	30	26	37	(Romania) Andrei Ciolacu	5	R2			
2023–2024		2nd	26	18	3	5	53	19	57	(Malta) Kemar David Reid	13	F			
2024–2025		3rd	32	17	11	4	48	23	62	(Nigeria) Franklin Sasere	14	SF			
Opening Round			16	10	5	1	27	10	35						
Closing Round			16	7	6	3	21	13	27						
2025–2026		W	32	21	7	4	51	27	70						
Opening Round			16	10	3	3	23	15	33	(Malta) Jake Grech / (The Gambia) Mustapha Jah	6 / 6				
Closing Round			16	11	4	1	28	12	37	(Argentina) Federico Varela	6				
