= St. George's F.C. =

Association football club in Malta

St. George's
- Full name: St. George's Football Club
- Nickname: The Pioneers
- Founded: 1890; 136 years ago
- Ground: Centenary Stadium, Malta
- Capacity: 2,000
- President: Rodnick Abdilla
- Manager: Edmond Lufi
- League: National Amateur League II
- 2024–25: National Amateur League II, 3rd of 10
- Website: facebook.com
Home colours	Away colours

St. George's Football Club is a Maltese association football club from Cospicua. They are currently playing in the Maltese National Amateur League II, and is believed to be the oldest association football club in Malta.

== History ==
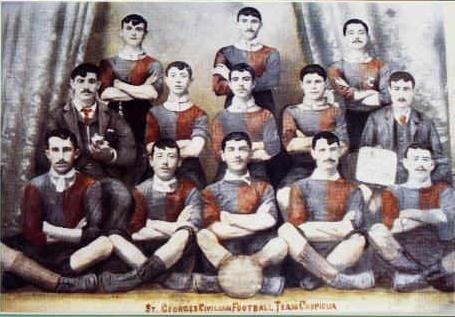
The oldest known photograph of the club, taken in 1894 after defeating Floriana F.C. to become Unofficial Civilian Champions.

During the 1880s, a group of Maltese youngsters was watching English soldiers playing football at the Verdala Barracks; an officer gave the young Maltese a ball and that was the start of the game on the island. They formed the first football club in Malta and named it Santa Margherita; two other clubs emerged soon after: St. Andrews and St. George's. The three clubs in Cospicua merged in 1890 to form one club, holding on to the St. George's name.

During the first years of the 20th century, they became Civilian Champions. The best season for the Cospicua team was 1916–17 during which St. George's F.C. won the 'double' by being crowned League champions and Knock Out Cousis Shield winners. One of the most notable players of St. George's was Emmanuel Balolu Busuttil, the only player to captain the St. George's side to their only championship in the 1916–17 season.

One of the most notable matches St. Georges played in their history was the 1965–66 the old second division decider against Qormi at the old Mannuel Island, a match that saw the biggest crowd of that season in all the MFA competitions. The match ended with a 2–1 score line in favour of St. Georges. From the corner flag, Zambula kicked the ball without anybody touching it straight into the nearest upright.

== Achievements ==
- Maltese Premier League
  - Winners: 1916–17
- Maltese Premier League
  - Runners-up: 1913–14, 1917–18, 1929–30, 1939–40
- Maltese FA Trophy
  - Finalist: 1936–37, 1949–50
- Cousis Shield
  - Winners: 1916–17, 1926–27
- Maltese First Division
  - Champions: 1991–92, 2005–06
- Division 2
  - Champions: 1953–54, 1956–57, 1958–59, 1965–66, 1971–72, 1973–74
- Maltese Second Division
  - Champions: 1987–88, 1996–97, 2003–04 2018–19
- Maltese Third Division
  - Champions: 2002-02
- Division 2 Sons of Malta Cup
  - Winners: 1971–72, 1973–74
- Christmas Cup
  - Winners: 1939–40

== Current squad ==
Note: Flags indicate national team as defined under FIFA eligibility rules; some limited exceptions apply. Players may hold more than one non-FIFA nationality.

No.	Pos.	Nation	Player
—	GK	MLT	Clive Caruana
—	DF	MLT	Gianluca Borg
—	FW	MLT	Jaden Camilleri
—	FW	MLT	Julien Iwueke
—	FW	MLT	Kenneth Aquilina
—	MF	MLT	Matthew Gauci (vice–captain)
—	MF	MLT	Owen Galea
—	DF	MLT	Jordan Debono
—	MF	MLT	Jeanpaul Baldacchino
—	DF	NGA	Victor Kayode
—	GK	MLT	Jake Schiavone

No.	Pos.	Nation	Player
—	MF	MLT	Kurt Zahra
—	FW	MLT	Jurgen Gerada
—	FW	MLT	Nathan Belhadj
—	MF	MLT	Dale Valletta
—	DF	MLT	Jael Vella
—	DF	MLT	Alexander Cauchi
—	MF	MLT	Lee Agius (captain)
—	MF	MLT	Sean Ellul
—	MF	MLT	Owen Cassar
—	FW	MLT	Matthias Formosa
—	DF	MLT	Johann Zarb

=== U21 squad ===
Note: Flags indicate national team as defined under FIFA eligibility rules; some limited exceptions apply. Players may hold more than one non-FIFA nationality.

No.	Pos.	Nation	Player
—	FW	MLT	Dashiell Refalo
—	MF	MLT	Ismael Abela
—	FW	MLT	Greig Vella

No.	Pos.	Nation	Player
—	DF	MLT	Jayden Aquilina
—	MF	MLT	Lawson Cassar

== Committee (2024–25) ==
- President: Stephen Vaughan Jr.
- Vice President: Rodnick Abdilla
- Secretary: Timmy Cucciardi
- Treasurer: JohnLouis Sammut
- Members: Kyle Azzopardi, Ludwig Bonnici, Ivan Camilleri, Clyde Agius
