= Sliema Wanderers F.C. =

Association football club

Sliema Wanderers
- Full name: Sliema Wanderers Football Club
- Nicknames: The Blues; The Wanderers
- Founded: 3 November 1909; 117 years ago
- Ground: Tigne Sports Complex, Sliema, Malta
- Capacity: 1,000
- Chairman: Keith Perry
- Manager: Pablo Doffo
- League: Maltese Premier League
- 2025–26: Maltese Premier League, 5th of 12
- Website: https://sliemawfc.com/
Home colours	Away colours

Sliema Wanderers Football Club, nicknamed "tax-Xelin" (of the shilling), is a professional Maltese football club. It is based in the seaside town of Sliema. It currently plays in the Maltese Premier League.

== History ==
The club was founded in 1909. The club competed in the first ever Maltese Premier League season in 1909–10 and finished in second position to Floriana after the five-game season came to an end.

Ten years down the line, Sliema Wanderers finally made their mark in Maltese football by winning the Maltese Premier League title in the 1919–20 season. Since then the team have gone on to win the title 26 times, a record for Malta; the last three being in 2002–03, 2003–04 and 2004–05.

Sliema Wanderers also hold the record for the most FA Trophy wins, with their first coming in 1935, when they overpowered Floriana with a 4–0 victory. The club have gone on to win this particular honour 20 times, most recently in 2000, 2004 and in 2009; the last title was won against Valletta 7–6 on penalties after the match finished 3–3 following extra time.

=== 2000s ===
The 2000s saw Sliema Wanderers becoming a dominant club in the Maltese scene again.

Summer 2003 had President Robert Arrigo signing Maltese internationals Jamie Pace, Djibril Sylla and Daniel Bogdanovic.

Season 2004-05 saw the Wanderers, under the presidency of Robert Arrigo, win their 26th Maltese Premier League title. Part of this success was Michael Mifsud's return to his boyhood club after being leaving 1.FC Kaiserslautern on a free.

Season 2005-06 started with a UEFA Champions League qualifier against Sheriff Tiraspol. Much to Arrigo's chagrin, lost Michael Mifsud to Lillestrøm SK, in a move made possible by Nikki Dimech who acted as his representative, albeit being a lengthy transfer saga that was complicated by International Transfer Clearance issues and compensation fees.

=== 2010s ===
Sliema Wanderers clinched a Maltese FA Trophy in season 2015-16.

Keith Perry was confirmed as president in the beginning of season 2016-17 despite rumours. John Buttigieg was appointed as Head Coach.

=== 2020s ===
The club endured a rough start to the 2020s. The club started off with a bang, signing former Arsenal F.C. midfielder Denílson. Further players were signed and Keith Perry was appointed chairman of the club, and Jeffrey Farrugia took over as president. A sponsorship deal was struck with Catco Group, an oil investment company based in China and Tunisia. Catco Group however, failed to pay its dues, citing technical reasons. This gave way to unrest within the club, with captain Mark Scerri and head coach Andrea Pisanu making public statements regarding the financial situation of the club, proceeding with resignations such as Perry and team manager Alex Muscat. Players went unpaid for months, with another sponsor, Sixt, finally paying the players directly just before Christmas. Eventually a new sponsor was brought on board. Farrugia was later ousted as Keith Perry returned in the President's seat in preparation for the upcoming season.

Season 2021-22 was disastrous from a technical point of view. Despite signing two new players in Djibouti international Warsama Hassan and Japanese Yuki Uchida, up until 19 November 2021, the club had not yet won a match, and sat at the bottom of the Maltese Premier League. The first win came on 20 November, stunning Valletta with a 2–1 result. The dying minutes of the match however, proved fatal, as Warsama Hassan was introduced at 90 minutes. However, the player had just returned from Egypt, where he had featured for his Djibouti national football team in a match against Algeria. Warsama was supposed to be in quarantine, having returned from a Dark Red listed country. Valletta lodged a formal complaint, which was upheld by the Malta Football Association, awarding a 3–0 win to Valletta. Sliema Wanderers' next match was against Birkirkara F.C., resulting in a further loss. On 10 April 2022 Sliema Wanderers lost against Valletta with a 2–1 result, and were relegated to Maltese Challenge League after thirty-seven years in the top flight.

In the 2026–27 season Sliema signed Maltese internationas Henry Bonello, Teddy Teuma, and Satariano.Sliema played an international friendly against 2-1 loss to Valletta F.C. . They participated in a pre-season friendly tournament held in Mosta. Their group (B) featured Marsaxlokk which they beat, won 3-2 against 4 times Malta Premier League winners Birkirkara F.C. and later beat 3-1 Żabbar St. Patrick F.C. and then went on to win the whole tournament with one goal by Limbombe in the final played against newly promoted Birzebbuga St. Peter's F.C..

8 August 2026	Birżebbuġa	0–1	Sliema Wanderers	Mosta
EEST (UTC+3)		Report	Limbombe 79'	Stadium: Charles Abela Memorial Stadium

== Rivalries ==
Sliema has a few rivals. Floriana F.C. and Sliema are eternal rivals since the league was founded they competed for the cup drawing huge attendances. The rivalry is called the Old Firm. The last few encounters mostly went Florianas side the last one them having won 1-0. The FA Final 2024 was between these two teams. The game saw two red cards and many yellows and fouls. After a goalless draw Sliema won 4-2 on penalties having Rashid al Tumi save 2 penalties.

In the old days Sliema were also rivals with St. Georges F.C. as they too competed for the league. But this rivalry has died over time as the haven't played for a long time about 20 years. St. George now plays in the BOV Amuture league II.

A more recent rivalry is the Sliema-Gżira United F.C. (Sliema won the most recent one 2-1) and Melita F.C. who now plays in the Challenge League (Sliema won the most recent won 4-2). These two cities (Melita represents St. Julians) border Sliema and compete for other things like tourism and progress.

== Futsal ==
Sliema Wanderers also had a futsal team, which participated in Malta's top futsal league until 2024. The 2023–24 season was the last edition of the Enemed Futsal League in which Sliema Wanderers Futsal participated, finishing at 9th place and thus qualified for the Enemed Challenger League.

Previously, Sliema had limited success in the domestic futsal competitions, finishing eighth in the 2010–11 season, fifth in 2011–12, and seventh in 2012–13 - out of ten teams. In the 2015–16 season, when the championship featured 14 teams, Sliema placed ninth.

Sliema Wanderers Bilbao Futsal reached the second round of the national cup in 2010–11 and 2012–13.

=== Youth Futsal League ===
On 13 February, Sliema Wanderers Youth Futsal won the Youth Futsal League after defeating Mosta 6–2 in the final played at the National Sport School in Pembroke, with Giorgio Comes scoring five goals for the winners.

== Players ==
=== Current squad ===
As of 15 August 2026. Note: Flags indicate national team as defined under FIFA eligibility rules; some limited exceptions apply. Players may hold more than one non-FIFA nationality.

No.	Pos.	Nation	Player
1	GK	MLT	Henry Bonello
2	DF	MLT	Jean Borg
3	DF	MLT	Nikolai Micallef
4	DF	ESP	Diego Cámara
7	DF	MLT	Adam Magri Overend
8	MF	POR	Matteo Lorenzi
9	FW	CUW	Nigel Robertha
10	MF	MLT	Teddy Teuma
11	FW	ARG	Brian Gambarte
14	MF	MLT	Karl Grima
15	DF	BRA	Gustavo Alcino
17	FW	BEL	Anthony Limbombe
19	FW	GRE	Nikos Karelis

No.	Pos.	Nation	Player
23	FW	MLT	Alexander Satariano
24	GK	MLT	Bradley Scalpello
27	FW	MLT	Luke Montebello
28	DF	MKD	Vlatko Drobarov
29	FW	ROU	Ionuț Cojocaru
30	MF	NGR	Wale Musa Alli
31	GK	MLT	Fabian Lauri
40	DF	NED	Robin Polley
44	GK	NGR	Kelvin Emeka Agu
70	MF	MLT	Stephen Pisani
77	FW	SOM	Mohamed Awad

=== Out on loan ===
Note: Flags indicate national team as defined under FIFA eligibility rules; some limited exceptions apply. Players may hold more than one non-FIFA nationality.

No.	Pos.	Nation	Player

== European record ==
Season	Competition	Round	Country	Club	Home	Away	Aggregate
1963–64	UEFA Cup Winners' Cup	Preliminary Round	(Wales)	Borough United	0–0	0–2	0–2
1964–65	European Cup	Preliminary Round	(Romania)	Dinamo București	0–2	0–5	0–7
1965–66	European Cup	Preliminary Round	(Greece)	Panathinaikos	1–0	1–4	2–4
1966–67	European Cup	Preliminary Round	(Bulgaria)	CSKA Sofia	1–2	0–4	1–6
1968–69	UEFA Cup Winners' Cup	1. Round	(Luxembourg)	US Rumelange	1–0	1–2	2–2(a)
1968–69	UEFA Cup Winners' Cup	2. Round	(Denmark)	Randers Freja	0–2	0–6	0–8
1969–70	UEFA Cup Winners' Cup	1. Round	(Sweden)	IFK Norrköping	1–0	1–5	2–5
1970–71	Inter-Cities Fairs Cup	1. Round	(Denmark)	Akademisk BK	2–3	0–7	2–10
1971–72	European Cup	1. Round	(Iceland)	ÍA Akranes	0–0	4–0	4–0
1971–72	European Cup	2. Round	(Scotland)	Celtic	1–2	0–5	1–7
1972–73	European Cup	1. Round	(Poland)	Górnik Zabrze	0–5	0–5	0–10
1973–74	UEFA Cup	1. Round	(Bulgaria)	Lokomotiv Plovdiv	0–2	0–1	0–3
1974–75	UEFA Cup Winners' Cup	1. Round	(Finland)	Lahti	2–0	1–4	3–4
1975–76	UEFA Cup	1. Round	(Portugal)	Sporting CP	1–2	1–3	2–5
1976–77	European Cup	1. Round	(Finland)	TPS Turku	2–1	0–1	2–2(a)
1977–78	UEFA Cup	1. Round	(West Germany)	Eintracht Frankfurt	0–0	0–5	0–5
1979–80	UEFA Cup Winners' Cup	1. Round	(Portugal)	Boavista	2–1	0–8	2–9
1980–81	UEFA Cup	1. Round	(Spain)	Barcelona	0–2	0–1	0–3
1981–82	UEFA Cup	1. Round	(Greece)	Aris Thessaloniki	2–4	0–4	2–8
1982–83	UEFA Cup Winners' Cup	1. Round	(Wales)	Swansea City	0–5	0–12	0–17
1987–88	UEFA Cup Winners' Cup	1. Round	(Albania)	Vllaznia	0–4	0–2	0–6
1988–89	UEFA Cup	1. Round	(Romania)	Victoria București	0–2	1–6	1–8
1989–90	European Cup	1. Round	(Albania)	KF Tirana	1–0	0–5	1–5
1990–91	UEFA Cup Winners' Cup	1. Round	(Czechoslovakia)	Dukla Prague	1–2	0–2	1–4
1993–94	UEFA Cup Winners' Cup	Qualifying Round	(Sweden)	Degerfors	1–3	0–3	1–6
1995–96	UEFA Cup	Preliminary Round	(Cyprus)	AC Omonia	1–2	0–3	1–5
1996–97	UEFA Cup	Preliminary Round	(Georgia (country))	Margveti Zestaponi	1–3	3–0	4–3
1996–97	UEFA Cup	Qualifying Round	(Denmark)	Odense BK	0–2	1–7	1–9
1998	UEFA Intertoto Cup	1. Round	(Hungary)	Diósgyőr	2–3	0–2	2–5
1999–00	UEFA Cup	1. Qualifying Round	(Switzerland)	FC Zürich	0–3	0–1	0–4
2000–01	UEFA Cup	1. Qualifying Round	(Serbia and Montenegro)	FK Partizan	2–1	1–4	3–5
2001–02	UEFA Cup	1. Qualifying Round	(Slovakia)	Matador Púchov	2–1	0–3	2–4
2002–03	UEFA Cup	1. Qualifying Round	(Poland)	Polonia Warsaw	1–3	0–2	1–5
2003–04	UEFA Champions League	1. Qualifying Round	(Latvia)	Skonto Riga	2–0	1–3	3–3(a)
2003–04	UEFA Champions League	2. Qualifying Round	(Denmark)	Copenhagen	0–6	1–4	1–10
2004–05	UEFA Champions League	1. Qualifying Round	(Lithuania)	FBK Kaunas	0–2	1–4	1–6
2005–06	UEFA Champions League	1. Qualifying Round	(Moldova)	Sheriff Tiraspol	1–4	0–2	1–6
2006–07	UEFA Cup	1. Qualifying Round	(Romania)	Rapid București	0–1	0–5	0–6
2007–08	UEFA Cup	1. Qualifying Round	(Bulgaria)	Litex Lovech	0–3	0–4	0–7
2009–10	UEFA Europa League	2. Qualifying Round	(Israel)	Maccabi Netanya	0–0	0–3	0–3
2010–11	UEFA Europa League	1. Qualifying Round	(Croatia)	Šibenik	0–3	0–0	0–3
2013–14	UEFA Europa League	1. Qualifying Round	(Azerbaijan)	Khazar Lankaran	1–1	0–1	1–2
2014–15	UEFA Europa League	1. Qualifying Round	(Hungary)	Ferencváros	1–1	1–2	2–3
2024–25	UEFA Conference League	2. Qualifying Round	(Armenia)	Noah	0−0	0−7	0−7

== Historical list of coaches ==
Paul Zammit was sacked after a loss to Swieqi United 2-1 in the Malta FA Cup round of 32 and was replaced by Argentian coach Pablo Doffo, the latter still active as of July 2026.

- (Malta) Joe A. Griffiths
- (Malta) Salvinu Schembri (1963–1964)
- (Hungary) János Bédl (1 July 1964 – 30 June 1966)
- (Malta) Victor Scerri (1968–1978)
- (Malta) Alfred "Freddie" Cardona (1978–1980)
- (Malta) Edward Aquilina (1979–1983)
- (Malta) Robbie Buttigieg (1981–1982)
- (Malta) Tony Formosa (1982–1986)
- (Malta) Lawrence Borg (1987–1991)
- (Bulgaria) Guentcho Dobrev (1992–1993)
- (Malta) Marcel Scucluna (1993)
- (Malta) Martin Gregory (1994)
- (Malta) Andrew Weavill (1994–1995)
- (Malta) John Calleja and (England) Mark Miller (1995–1996)
- (Nigeria) Augustine Eguavoen (July 1999 – October 1999)
- (Malta) Martin Gregory (1999–2000)
- (England) Jeff Wood (2001–2002)
- (Malta) Lawrence Borg (2001–2002)
- (Malta) Edward Aquilina (2002–2006)
- (Malta) Ray Farrugia (2006–2007)
- (Malta) Stephen Azzopardi (1 November 2007 – 30 May 2010)
- (Malta) Mark Marlow (1 July 2010 – 30 June 2011)
- (Serbia) Danilo Dončić (3 February 2011 – 27 May 2012)
- (Malta) Clive Mizzi (27 May 2012 – 7 August 2012)
- (Italy) Alfonso Greco (1 July 2012 – October 2014)
- (Malta) Stephen Azzopardi (October 2014 – December 2015)
- (Italy) Alfonso Greco (1 January 2016 – May 2016)
- (Malta) John Buttigieg (June 2016 – 2019)
- (Italy) Stefano Maccoppi (2019)
- (Italy) Alfonso Greco (July 2019 – February 2020)
- (Italy) Andrea Pisanu (2020-2021)
- (Malta) Noel Turner (2022)
- (Malta) Paul Zammit (2022-2026)
- (Argentina) Pablo Doffo (2026-)

== Honours ==
- record
- ^{s} shared record

Competition	Titles	Seasons
Maltese Premier League	26	1919–20, 1922–23, 1923–24, 1925–26, 1929–30, 1932–33, 1933–34, 1935–36, 1937–38, 1938–39, 1939–40, 1948–49, 1953–54, 1955–56, 1956–57, 1963–64, 1964–65, 1965–66, 1970–71, 1971–72, 1975–76, 1988–89, 1995–96, 2002–03, 2003–04, 2004–05
Maltese FA Trophy	22	1934–35, 1935–36, 1936–37, 1939–40, 1945–46, 1947–48, 1950–51, 1951–52, 1955–56, 1958–59, 1962–63, 1964–65, 1967–68, 1968–69, 1973–74, 1978–79, 1989–90, 1999–2000, 2003–04, 2008–09, 2015–16, 2023–24
Maltese Challenge League	2	1983–84, 2022–23
Maltese Super Cup	3	1996, 2000, 2009
Cassar Cup	11	1923–24, 1924–25, 1933–34, 1934–35, 1937–38, 1938–39, 1945–46, 1955–56, 1956–57, 1959–60, 1966–67
Scicluna Cup	10	1949–50, 1950–51, 1953–54, 1954–55, 1955–56, 1956–57, 1957–58, 1958–59, 1959–60, 1965–66
Euro Cup Malta	6^{s}	1982, 1987, 1990, 2004, 2005, 2010
Independence Cup	5	1964–65, 1969–70, 1971–72, 1973–74, 1981–82
Cousis Shield	4	1917–18, 1919–20, 1923–24, 1925–26
MFA League Cup	4	1965–66, 1969–70, 1978–79, 1984–85
Christmas Cup	3	1966–67, 1967–68, 1970–71
Schembri Shield	3^{s}	1955–56, 1956–57, 1957–58
Super 5 Cup	3	1990–91, 2001–02, 2003–04
Löwenbräu Cup	3	1999, 2001, 2002
Christmas Tourney Cup	2	1936–37, 1948–49
Testaferrata Cup	2	1964–65, 1974–75
Sons of Malta Cup	2	1972–73, 1979–80
Atkins Cup	1	1922–23
Empire Sports Ground Cup	1	1923–24
MFA Cup	1	1931–32
MPFA Shield	1	1954–55
Summer Cup	1	2024
Evolution Gaming Summer Cup	1	2016
Summer Cup (Mosta Tour) (Sir Gammari Muscat Cup)	2	2004, 2026

== Statistics ==
=== Domestic ===
Post-WWII season-by-season performance of the club:

Season	League									
Season	Div.	Tier	Pos.	Pl.	W	D	L	GS	GA	P
1944–45	Maltese Premier League	I	2nd	3	1	1	1	10	5	3
1945–46	Maltese Premier League	I	2nd	12	8	1	3	39	15	17
1946–47	Maltese Premier League	I	4th	14	6	2	6	30	25	14
1947–48	Maltese Premier League	I	3rd	14	7	5	2	35	23	19
1948–49	Maltese Premier League	I	1st	14	11	0	3	33	15	22
1949–50	Maltese Premier League	I	3rd	14	8	3	3	31	15	19
1950–51	Maltese Premier League	I	4th	14	8	2	4	25	11	18
1951–52	Maltese Premier League	I	3rd	14	7	5	2	27	15	19
1952–53	Maltese Premier League	I	4th	14	4	5	5	20	16	13
1953–54	Maltese Premier League	I	1st	14	9	2	3	31	16	20
1954–55	Maltese Premier League	I	2nd	14	10	1	3	33	16	21
1955–56	Maltese Premier League	I	1st	14	12	0	2	48	12	24
1956–57	Maltese Premier League	I	1st	14	12	2	0	43	6	26
1957–58	Maltese Premier League	I	2nd	14	10	1	3	32	11	21
1958–59	Maltese Premier League	I	2nd	14	9	0	5	31	21	18
1959–60	Maltese Premier League	I	5th	14	5	5	4	19	20	15
1960–61	Maltese Premier League	I	3rd	14	9	2	3	31	16	20
1961–62	Maltese Premier League	I	3rd	14	7	3	4	25	20	17
1962–63	Maltese Premier League	I	3rd	14	9	3	2	26	13	21
1963–64	Maltese Premier League	I	1st	14	13	0	1	39	9	26
1964–65	Maltese Premier League	I	1st	14	9	2	1	36	9	20
1965–66	Maltese Premier League	I	1st	10	7	3	0	24	7	17
1966–67	Maltese Premier League	I	2nd	10	7	2	1	25	7	16
1967–68	Maltese Premier League	I	2nd	14	9	2	3	36	11	20
1968–69	Maltese Premier League	I	4th	14	6	5	3	14	8	17
1969–70	Maltese Premier League	I	2nd	14	7	5	2	24	9	19
1970–71	Maltese Premier League	I	1st	14	7	6	1	17	5	20
1971–72	Maltese Premier League	I	1st	18	10	6	2	28	7	26
1972–73	Maltese Premier League	I	2nd	18	10	5	3	34	14	25
1973–74	Maltese Premier League	I	4th	18	8	5	5	25	14	21
1974–75	Maltese Premier League	I	2nd	18	11	2	5	30	20	24
1975–76	Maltese Premier League	I	1st	18	11	4	3	35	13	26
1976–77	Maltese Premier League	I	2nd	18	10	7	1	34	14	27
1977–78	Maltese Premier League	I	3rd	18	8	8	2	28	14	24
1978-79	Maltese Premier League	IA	1st	8	7	0	1	16	5	14
1978-79	Maltese Premier League	ICP	3rd	6	2	0	4	7	9	4
1979–80	Maltese Premier League	I	2nd	18	13	2	3	47	11	28
1980–81	Maltese Premier League	I	2nd	14	10	3	1	27	8	23
1981–82	Maltese Premier League	I	2nd	14	8	2	4	24	20	18
1982–83	Maltese Premier League	I	7th ↓	14	4	4	6	14	11	12
1983-84	Maltese First Division	IIP1	2nd	7	4	1	2			9
1983-84	Maltese First Division	IIP2	1st ↑	6	5	1	0			11
1984–85	Maltese Premier League	I	3rd	13	5	5	3	13	10	15
1985–86	Maltese Premier League	I	6th	14	4	3	7	19	22	11
1986–87	Maltese Premier League	I	4th	14	5	4	5	12	16	14
1987–88	Maltese Premier League	I	2nd	14	8	3	3	19	7	19
1988–89	Maltese Premier League	I	1st	16	11	4	1	32	16	26
1989–90	Maltese Premier League	I	2nd	16	11	2	3	36	11	24
1990–91	Maltese Premier League	I	5th	16	4	7	5	24	20	15
1991–92	Maltese Premier League	I	3rd	18	10	4	4	37	20	24
1992–93	Maltese Premier League	I	7th	18	6	3	9	26	31	15
1993–94	Maltese Premier League	I	5th	18	7	5	6	23	14	19
1994–95	Maltese Premier League	I	2nd	18	12	3	3	55	22	39
1995–96	Maltese Premier League	I	1st	18	15	1	2	55	16	46
1996–97	Maltese Premier League	I	4th	27	14	4	9	58	30	46
1997–98	Maltese Premier League	I	3rd	27	18	2	7	64	26	56
1998–99	Maltese Premier League	I	3rd	27	14	5	8	54	32	47
1999-00	Maltese Premier League	IP1	4th	18	10	3	5	41	23	33
1999-00	Maltese Premier League	ICP	2nd	10	7	1	2	21	13	39
2000-01	Maltese Premier League	IP1	2nd	18	12	3	3	70	24	39
2000-01	Maltese Premier League	ICP	2nd	10	6	2	2	26	13	40
2001-02	Maltese Premier League	IP1	3rd	18	12	2	4	48	16	38
2001-02	Maltese Premier League	ICP	2nd	10	5	2	3	19	14	36
2002-03	Maltese Premier League	IP1	1st	18	14	2	2	51	16	44
2002-03	Maltese Premier League	ICP	1st	10	6	2	2	19	12	42
2003-04	Maltese Premier League	IP1	1st	18	13	2	3	37	15	41
2003-04	Maltese Premier League	ICP	1st	10	7	1	2	24	12	43
2004-05	Maltese Premier League	IP1	1st	18	13	3	2	33	15	42
2004-05	Maltese Premier League	ICP	1st	10	5	4	1	14	8	40
2005-06	Maltese Premier League	IP1	2nd	18	12	3	3	37	12	39
2005-06	Maltese Premier League	ICP	2nd	10	5	2	3	21	15	37
2006-07	Maltese Premier League	IP1	2nd	18	10	4	4	33	21	34
2006-07	Maltese Premier League	ICP	2nd	10	5	3	2	17	13	35
2007-08	Maltese Premier League	IP1	3rd	18	9	5	4	31	18	32
2007-08	Maltese Premier League	ICP	4th	10	6	0	4	16	15	34
2008-09	Maltese Premier League	IP1	4th	18	7	5	6	24	24	26
2008-09	Maltese Premier League	ICP	4th	10	3	3	4	9	17	25
2009-10	Maltese Premier League	IP1	4th	18	9	2	7	29	21	29
2009-10	Maltese Premier League	ICP	3rd	10	5	0	5	12	16	30
2010-11	Maltese Premier League	IP1	7th	18	5	7	6	22	26	22
2010-11	Maltese Premier League	IRP	7th	10	5	0	1	15	5	26
2011-12	Maltese Premier League	IP1	4th	18	8	11	3	34	24	35
2011-12	Maltese Premier League	ICP	5th	10	1	3	6	13	23	23
2012-13	Maltese Premier League	IP1	5th	22	11	4	7	34	22	37
2012-13	Maltese Premier League	ICP	4th	10	5	2	3	14	13	36
2013-14	Maltese Premier League	IP1	4th	22	12	7	3	43	24	43
2013-14	Maltese Premier League	ICP	5th	10	2	3	5	11	18	31
2014–15	Maltese Premier League	I	6th	33	10	9	14	50	56	26
2015–16	Maltese Premier League	I	7th	33	12	6	15	49	51	30
2016–17	Maltese Premier League	I	6th	33	15	7	11	47	37	52
2017–18	Maltese Premier League	I	7th	26	11	7	8	35	26	40
2018–19	Maltese Premier League	I	5th	26	13	6	7	37	26	45
2019–20	Maltese Premier League	I	10th	20	7	3	10	24	22	24
2020–21	Maltese Premier League	I	5th	23	12	4	7	39	31	40
2021-22	Maltese Premier League	IP1	12th	22	2	6	14	12	33	12
2021-22	Maltese Premier League	IRP	12th ↓	5	2	0	3	4	10	18
2022-23	Maltese Challenge League	IIP1	1st	17	15	2	0	40	10	47
2022-23	Maltese Challenge League	IICP	1st ↑	10	9	1	0	26	4	75
2023–24	Maltese Premier League	I	3rd	26	14	8	4	34	12	50
2024–25	Maltese Premier League	IM1	3rd	11	6	4	1	15	5	22
2024–25	Maltese Premier League	ICP1	3rd	5	2	2	1	8	5	8
2024–25	Maltese Premier League	IM2	5th	11	6	0	5	18	13	18
2024–25	Maltese Premier League	ICP2	1st	5	3	1	1	9	4	10
2025–26	Maltese Premier League	IM1	4th	11	5	4	2	16	14	19
2025–26	Maltese Premier League	ICP1	4th	5	2	1	2	5	5	7
2025–26	Maltese Premier League	IM2	7th	11	4	4	3	10	11	16
2025–26	Maltese Premier League	IRP2	7th	5	1	3	1	6	6	6
