= 2004–05 Maltese FA Trophy =

Tournament details
- Country: Malta

Final positions
- Champions: Birkirkara (3rd title)
- Runners-up: Msida St. Joseph

The 2004–05 Maltese FA Trophy was the 67th season since its establishment. The competition started on 6 November 2004 and ended on 20 May 2005 with the final, which Birkirkara won 2–1 against Msida St. Joseph.

== First round ==
Team 1	Score	Team 2
6 November 2004
Valletta	4–0	Balzan Youths
St. Patrick	1–4 (a.e.t.)	Senglea Athletic
7 November 2004
Pietà Hotspurs	3–0	Marsa
Mosta	1–3	Msida St. Joseph
St. George's	0–6	Floriana
13 November 2004
San Gwann	1–0	Lija Athletic
Naxxar Lions	0–5	Mqabba
Hamrun Spartans	bye	

== Second round ==
Team 1	Score	Team 2
26 December 2004
Hamrun Spartans	0–2 (a.e.t.)	Floriana
Pietà Hotspurs	1–2	Valletta
27 December 2004
San Gwann	1–1 (a.e.t.) (4–5 p)	Mqabba
Senglea Athletic	1–3	Msida St. Joseph

== Quarter-finals ==
Team 1	Score	Team 2
2 April 2005
Birkirkara	3–2	Floriana
Msida St. Joseph	1–0	Hibernians
3 April 2005
Sliema Wanderers	3–2	Mqabba
Marsaxlokk	4–2	Valletta

== Semi-finals ==
13 May 2005	Sliema Wanderers	0–0 (a.e.t.) (4–5 p)	Birkirkara	Ta' Qali
		Report		Stadium: Ta' Qali National Stadium; Referee: Chris Lautier
	Penalties
	Turner (penalty scored); Giglio (penalty scored); Chetcuti (penalty scored); Anonam (penalty missed); Woods (penalty scored); Mattocks (penalty missed)		(penalty scored) Dronca; (penalty scored) Camenzuli; (penalty scored) Doda; (penalty scored) L. Galea; (penalty missed) Bonnici; (penalty scored) M. Galea

14 May 2005	Msida St. Joseph	2–2 (a.e.t.) (5–4 p)	Marsaxlokk	Ta' Qali
	Nwoke 13'; Zammit 120'	Report	Frendo 10'; Pace 102'	Stadium: Ta' Qali National Stadium; Referee: Anton Zammit
	Penalties
	Theuma (penalty scored); Sammut (penalty missed); Cachia (penalty scored); Micallef (penalty scored); Zammit (penalty scored); Nwoke (penalty scored)		(penalty scored) Paiber; (penalty scored) Licari; (penalty scored) Bajada; (penalty scored) Pace; (penalty missed) Templeman; (penalty missed) Mamo

== Final ==
20 May 2005

Birkirkara	2–1	Msida St. Joseph
L. Galea 52'; M. Galea 84'	Report	Boni 83'

Ta' Qali National Stadium, Ta' Qali
Referee: Marco Borg
