= Claude Mattocks =

Footballer

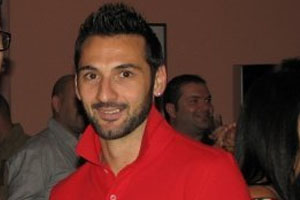

Personal information
- Full name: Claude John Mattocks
- Date of birth: 21 February 1980 (age 46)
- Place of birth: Floriana, Malta
- Height: 5 ft 11 in (1.80 m)
- Position: Midfielder

Senior career*
Years	Team	Apps	(Gls)
1996–2004	Floriana	141	(16)
2004–2007	Sliema Wanderers	45	(3)
2005–2006	→Valletta (loan)	12	(3)
2007–2008	Valletta	12	(1)
2008–2009	Marsaxlokk	13	(1)

International career^{‡}
- Malta U16
- Malta U18
- Malta U21
2003–2009	Malta	16	(0)
- * Club domestic league appearances and goals as of 17 January 2010 ‡ National team caps and goals as of 17 January 2010

Claude John Mattocks (born 21 February 1980 in Floriana, Malta) was a professional footballer who last played for Maltese Premier League side Marsaxlokk as a midfielder.

== Playing career ==
=== Floriana ===
Claude began his career playing for his local side Floriana during the 1996–97 season. Mattocks went on to make three appearances that season, scoring his first goal for the club, as Floriana finished in 3rd position in the Maltese Premier League.

Claude started to force his way into the first team at Floriana with some impressive displays during the 1997–98 season, as Floriana finished in 5th position, with Mattocks making 14 appearances, but failing to score any goals.

For the 1998–99 season, Claude's first team opportunities were restricted to just 10 appearances, he did however score one goal, which helped Floriana record another 5th-place finish in the Maltese Premier League.

During the 1999–00, Mattocks firmly established himself in the Floriana first team squad, making 22 appearances and scoring three goals, as Floriana finished in an impressive 4th position in the Maltese Premier League.

Mattocks went into the 2000–01 season hopeful of improving on the club's previous finish, however Floriana managed another 5th-place finish in the Maltese Premier League, with Claude making 25 appearances, and scoring four goals.

Claude continued to impress and went into the 2001–02 season hoping to help Floriana finish in a higher league position, but again they finished in 5th position in the Maltese Premier League, as Mattocks made 25 appearances, but failed to score any goals.

For the 2002–03 season, Claude and Floriana almost took an almighty fall from grace, as they finished the season in the relegation pool, and narrowly avoided relegation after finishing in 8th position, with Mattocks making 20 appearances, and scoring five goals to help the team cause. Despite the poor form of Floriana, Mattocks did receive his first cap for the Maltese national team.

Claude went into the 2003–04 season in great form, and attracting interest from other teams in the Maltese Premier League, Mattocks completed the season with Floriana, helping the club return to the championship pool to record a 6th-place finish. Claude made 22 appearances, scoring two goals during the season.

=== Sliema Wanderers ===
Following a host of impressive performances for Floriana, Claude joined fellow Maltese Premier League side Sliema Wanderers for the 2004–05 season. The move was an instant success as Mattocks helped his new club to the Maltese Premier League title. During the season Claude made 23 appearances and scored three goals.

For the 2005–06 season, Claude began the season with Sliema Wanderers making 9 appearances, but scoring no goals. During the January transfer window of 2007, Claude switched to Valletta on loan for the remainder of the season. During the season with Valletta, Mattocks made 12 appearances and scored three goals to help the club to a 5th-place finish in the Maltese Premier League, with his contracted club Sliema Wanderers finishing in 2nd position.

Claude returned to Sliema Wanderers for the 2006–07 season, he made 13 appearances, but failed to score any goals throughout the season, as Sliema Wanderers finished in 2nd position in the Maltese Premier League for the second consecutive season.

Mattocks began the 2007–08 season with Sliema Wanderers. Claude made only one appearance, without scoring, and left the club during the January transfer window of 2008. Sliema Wanderers did go on to finish in 4th position in the Maltese Premier League that season.

=== Valletta ===
Claude rejoined Valletta for the second half of the 2007–08 season, he went on to make 12 appearances and scored one goal, as Mattocks won the Maltese Premier League title for the second time in his career, as Valletta finished in 1st position.

=== Marsaxlokk ===
On 20 August 2008, it was confirmed that Claude Mattocks had joined Marsaxlokk from Valletta, teaming up with former Valletta team-mate Saviour Darmanin, who had made the same move the previous month. Mattocks was allocated with the number 21 shirt.

Mattocks made his debut for Marsaxlokk four days later on 24 August 2008, where the side played newly promoted Qormi. He came off the bench as a second-half substitute for Christian Cassar on the 56th minute, and it was Mattocks, with the game three minutes into stoppage time, who crossed a ball into the box, to be met by Julio Alcorsé, who flicked the ball past a helpless Matthew Farrugia to secure a 1–1 draw.

== Honours ==
=== Sliema Wanderers ===
- Maltese Premier League: 2004–05

=== Valletta ===
- Maltese Premier League: 2007–08

== Career statistics ==
Statistics accurate as of match played 1 August 2009.

Club performance			League		Cup		League Cup		Continental		Total	
Season	Club	League	Apps	Goals	Apps	Goals	Apps	Goals	Apps	Goals	Apps	Goals
Malta			League		Maltese Cup		League Cup		Europe		Total	
1996-97	Floriana	Maltese Premier League	3	1	0	0	0	0	0	0	3	1
1997-98	Floriana	Maltese Premier League	14	0	0	0	0	0	0	0	14	0
1998-99	Floriana	Maltese Premier League	10	1	0	0	0	0	0	0	10	1
1999-00	Floriana	Maltese Premier League	22	3	0	0	0	0	0	0	22	3
2000-01	Floriana	Maltese Premier League	25	4	0	0	0	0	0	0	25	4
2001-02	Floriana	Maltese Premier League	25	0	0	0	0	0	0	0	25	0
2002-03	Floriana	Maltese Premier League	20	5	0	0	0	0	0	0	20	5
2003-04	Floriana	Maltese Premier League	22	2	0	0	0	0	0	0	22	2
2004-05	Sliema Wanderers	Maltese Premier League	23	3	0	0	0	0	0	0	23	3
2005-06	Sliema Wanderers	Maltese Premier League	9	0	0	0	0	0	0	0	9	0
2005-06	Valletta (loan)	Maltese Premier League	12	3	0	0	0	0	0	0	12	3
2006-07	Sliema Wanderers	Maltese Premier League	13	0	0	0	0	0	0	0	13	0
2007-08	Sliema Wanderers	Maltese Premier League	1	0	0	0	0	0	0	0	1	0
2007-08	Valletta	Maltese Premier League	12	1	0	0	0	0	0	0	12	1
2008-09	Marsaxlokk	Maltese Premier League	13	1	0	0	0	0	0	0	13	1
2009-10	Marsaxlokk	Maltese First Division	0	0	0	0	0	0	0	0	0	0
Total	Malta		223	24	0	0	0	0	0	0	223	24
Career total			223	24	0	0	0	0	0	0	223	24
