= Carlo Mamo =

Maltese footballer

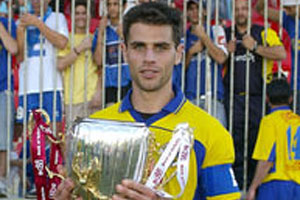

Personal information
- Date of birth: 23 April 1979 (age 47)
- Place of birth: Tarxien, Malta
- Height: 5 ft 10 in (1.78 m)
- Position: Defender

Senior career*
Years	Team	Apps	(Gls)
1997–1999	Tarxien Rainbows	14	(1)
1999–2000	Birkirkara	25	(0)
2000–2004	Sliema Wanderers	84	(2)
2004–	Marsaxlokk	115	(6)
2010	→ Birkirkara (loan)	11	(0)
2010–2011	Marsaxlokk	37	(0)
2012–2014	Tarxien Rainbows	43	(2)
2014–2015	Pembroke Athleta		

International career^{‡}
1998-2001	Malta U21	23	(2)
2002–2011	Malta	22	(0)
- * Club domestic league appearances and goals as of 10 January 2010 ‡ National team caps and goals as of 10 January 2010

Carlo Mamo (born 23 April 1979 in Tarxien, Malta) is a retired professional footballer, who played as a defender. He is the General Secretary of the Malta Football Players Association. He has a Master's in Sports Management and Sports Law.

== Playing career ==
=== Tarxien Rainbows ===
Carlo began his career with his home town club, Tarxien Rainbows, in the 1997–98 season. Mamo went on to make 14 appearances and score one goal during the season. However, his first season ended in disappointment as Tarxien Rainbows finished in 10th position in the Maltese Premier League, requiring the club to be relegated to the First Division.

Mamo went into the 1998–99 season, hoping to help Tarxien Rainbows gain a quick return to the Maltese Premier League. However, the team failed to gain promotion, and remained in the Maltese First Division.

=== Birkirkara ===
Following a string of impressive performances for the Tarxien Rainbows, Carlo joined Birkirkara for the 1999–00 season. The move was an instant success as Mamo helped his new club finish in 1st position and win the Maltese Premier League title. Throughout the season, Carlo made 25 appearances, but failed to score a goal.

=== Sliema Wanderers ===
Despite the successes of the previous season, Carlo opted to leave the Birkirkara football club and join fellow Premier League side Sliema Wanderers for the 2000–01 season. In his first season with the Sliema Wanderers, Mamo made 19 appearances and scored one goal, as he helped the club to a 2nd-place finish.

Carlo went into the 2001–02 season, as an established member of the first team squad. The club finished one position worse off than the previous, as they recorded a 3rd-place finish, with Carlo making 24 appearances, but failing to score a goal.

The 2002–03 season was one of triumph for Carlo, as he won his second Premier League title, and his first with the Sliema Wanderers, making 17 appearances and scoring one goal.

The success continued for Carlo and Sliema during the 2003–04 season. The club again finished in 1st position and won the title, with Mamo making 24 appearances without scoring.

=== Marsaxlokk ===
In 2004, Carlo Mamo swapped the Wanderers for fellow Premier League team Marsaxlokk. His first season was the 2004-05 season. During his debut season with his new club, Carlo made 21 appearances, scoring two goals, and helped his club to a 5th-place finish.

In the 2005-06 season with Marsaxokk Mamo made 24 appearances and score one goal. Marsaxokk improved to a 3rd-place finish.

Carlo Mamo and Marsaxlokk F.C. reached the heights of Maltese football during the 2006-07 season, as Mamo captained his team to the title for the first time in the club's history. Carlo proved instrumental in the club's success, forming a solid partnership in the centre of the defence with fellow Maltese International defender Luke Dimech. During the season Carlo made 25 appearances and scored two goals.

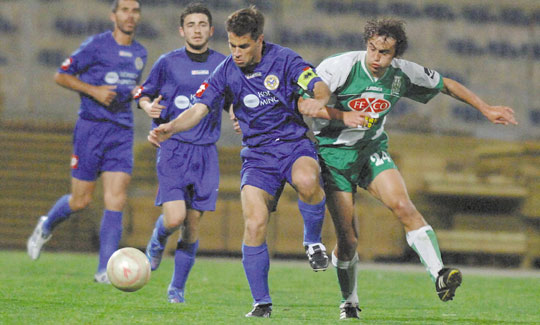
Carlo Mamo in action for Marsaxlokk.

For the 2007-08 season, Carlo was hoping to help Marsaxlokk retain the title. However, the club suffered the loss of many important players and finished in 2nd place in the League with Carlo making 19 appearances and scoring one goal.

Carlo went into the 2008-09 season captaining Marsaxlokk to a 4th-place finish, despite an extremely disappointing start to the season. Following a corruption case against the club, the club was relegated to the Maltese First Division. Carlo made 24 appearances, but failed to score.

Following the verdict of relegation for Marsaxlokk, Mamo showed loyalty by signing a new three-and-a-half-year contract with the club despite reported interest from Premier League duo Qormi and his home town club of Tarxien Rainbows. During the 2009-10 season, Mamo made a total of six appearances, but failed to score any goals.

=== Birkirkara ===
On 20 January 2010, the Marsaxlokk captain signed a deal to re-join his former club Birkirkara on loan until the end of the 2009-10 season. He made 11 appearances, helping Birkirkara to win the Maltese Premier League.

=== Tarxien Rainbows ===
On 4 January 2012, Carlo Mamo signed a deal of 18 months with the Tarxien Rainbows F.C.

== Honours ==
=== Birkirkara ===
- Maltese Premier League: 1999–2000, 2009–10

=== Sliema Wanderers ===
- Maltese Premier League: 2003–04, 2004–05
- Maltese FA Trophy: 2003–04

=== Marsaxlokk ===
- Maltese Premier League: 2006–07

== Career statistics ==
Statistics accurate as of match played 30 August 2010.

Club performance			League		Cup		League Cup		Continental		Total	
Season	Club	League	Apps	Goals	Apps	Goals	Apps	Goals	Apps	Goals	Apps	Goals
Malta			League		Maltese Cup		League Cup		Europe		Total	
1997-98	Tarxien Rainbows	Maltese Premier League	14	1	0	0	0	0	0	0	14	1
1998-99	Tarxien Rainbows	Maltese First Division			0	0	0	0	0	0		
1999-00	Birkirkara	Maltese Premier League	25	0	0	0	0	0	0	0	25	0
2000-01	Sliema Wanderers	Maltese Premier League	19	1	0	0	0	0	0	0	19	1
2001-02	Sliema Wanderers	Maltese Premier League	24	0	0	0	0	0	0	0	24	0
2002-03	Sliema Wanderers	Maltese Premier League	17	1	0	0	0	0	0	0	17	1
2003-04	Sliema Wanderers	Maltese Premier League	24	0	0	0	0	0	0	0	24	0
2004-05	Marsaxlokk	Maltese Premier League	21	2	0	0	0	0	0	0	21	2
2005-06	Marsaxlokk	Maltese Premier League	24	1	0	0	0	0	0	0	24	1
2006-07	Marsaxlokk	Maltese Premier League	25	2	0	0	0	0	0	0	25	2
2007-08	Marsaxlokk	Maltese Premier League	19	1	0	0	0	0	0	0	19	1
2008-09	Marsaxlokk	Maltese Premier League	24	0	0	0	0	0	0	0	24	0
2009-10	Marsaxlokk	Maltese First Division	6	0	0	0	0	0	0	0	6	0
2009-10	Birkirkara (loan)	Maltese Premier League	11	0	0	0	0	0	0	0	11	0
2010-11	Marsaxlokk	Maltese Premier League	0	0	0	0	0	0	0	0	0	0
Total	Malta		253	9	0	0	0	0	0	0	253	9
Career total			253	9	0	0	0	0	0	0	253	9
