= Shaun Bajada =

Malta international footballer (b.1983)

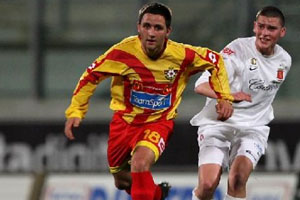

Personal information
- Full name: Shaun Pierre Bajada
- Date of birth: 19 August 1983 (age 43)
- Place of birth: Sannat, Gozo, Malta
- Height: 5 ft 9 in (1.75 m)
- Position: Midfielder

Team information
- Current team: Victoria Hotspurs (on loan from Xewkija Tigers)
- Number: 18

Youth career
- Sannat Lions

Senior career*
Years	Team	Apps	(Gls)
2000–2004	Floriana	48	(3)
2004–2007	Marsaxlokk	43	(6)
2007	→ Msida Saint-Joseph (loan)	11	(1)
2007–2012	Birkirkara	116	(16)
2012–2015	Valletta	20	(1)
2013	→ Sliema Wanderers (loan)	14	(2)
2015–2016	Ghajnsielem	26	(7)
2016–2017	Birkirkara	13	(0)
2017–2018	Ghajnsielem		
2018–	Xewkija Tigers		
2019–	→ Victoria Hotspurs (loan)		

International career^{‡}
	Malta U21	23	(1)
2008–	Malta	33	(0)
2010	Gozo	1	(0)
- * Club domestic league appearances and goals as of 4 October 2013 ‡ National team caps and goals as of 30 March 2013

Shaun Pierre Bajada (born 19 August 1983 in Sannat, Gozo, Malta) is a professional footballer currently playing for Victoria Hotspurs on loan from Xewkija Tigers, where he most frequently plays as a midfielder.

== Playing career ==
=== Floriana ===
As a boy he had won many honours with his native village club Sannat Lions, but was a product of Floriana.

Shaun made his debut with Floriana in the Maltese Premier League in the season 2000–01. During a career spanning four seasons with Floriana, Shaun made 48 appearances and scored three goals.

=== Marsaxlokk ===
On 22 January 2005, Shaun joined Marsaxlokk. Bajada signed a four-and-a-half-year contract with the club. Bajada was the first signing from the local market of the month after the club transferred Etienne Barbara to Birkirkara. Bajada arrived along with two foreigners, Bulgarian Mitko Trendafilov and Nigerian Michael Ochei.

During his time with Marsaxlokk, Shaun made 43 appearances and scored six goals.

=== Msida Saint-Joseph ===
On 25 January 2007, Peter Pullicino joined Marsaxlokk from Msida Saint-Joseph, as part of the deal Shaun Bajada was loaned to Msida Saint-Joseph until July 2007.

During this time Bajada made 11 appearances and scored one goal.

=== Birkirkara ===
Following the completion of his loan spell Msida Saint-Joseph, on 5 August 2007, Marsaxlokk and Birkirkara reached an agreement over a swap deal which saw William Camenzuli join Marsaxlokk and Bajada would join Birkirkara.

=== Victoria Hotspurs ===
On 31 January 2019 Victoria Hotspurs announced, that they had come to an agreement to exchange Bajada from Xewkija Tigers and Joseph Mario Vella from Victoria in a swap loan deal between both clubs.

== International career ==
=== Malta ===
Shaun has played with the Maltese National Team at Under- 21 level, Under- 19 level, Under- 18 level and Under- 16 level. In January 2008 Bajada was chosen as part of the squad for the Maltese national team and he played his first match on 2 February 2008.

== Personal life ==
- Shaun is a supporter of his local team Sannat Lions in the Gozo Football League First Division.
- Shaun also follows the fortunes of Manchester United and Juventus.

== Career statistics ==
Statistics accurate as of match played 1 August 2013.

Club performance			League		Cup		League Cup		Continental		)	Total		
Season	Club	League	Apps	Goals	Apps	Goals	Apps	Goals	Apps	Goals	Apps	Goals		
Malta			League		Maltese Cup		League Cup		Europe		Gozo Football League First Division			Total
2000–01	Floriana	Maltese Premier League	1	0	0	0	0	0	0	0	1	0		
2001–02	Floriana	Maltese Premier League	2	0	0	0	0	0	0	0	2	0		
2002–03	Floriana	Maltese Premier League	12	0	0	0	0	0	0	0	12	0		
2003–04	Floriana	Maltese Premier League	23	2	0	0	0	0	0	0	23	2		
2004–05	Floriana	Maltese Premier League	10	1	0	0	0	0	0	0	10	1		
2004–05	Marsaxlokk	Maltese Premier League	10	0	0	0	0	0	0	0	10	0		
2005–06	Marsaxlokk	Maltese Premier League	27	5	0	0	0	0	0	0	27	5		
2006–07	Marsaxlokk	Maltese Premier League	6	1	0	0	0	0	0	0	6	1		
2006–07	Msida Saint-Joseph (loan)	Maltese Premier League	11	1	0	0	0	0	0	0	11	1		
2007–08	Birkirkara	Maltese Premier League	28	4	0	0	0	0	0	0	28	4		
2008–09	Birkirkara	Maltese Premier League	26	3	0	0	0	0	1	0	27	3		
2009–10	Birkirkara	Maltese Premier League	27	7	0	0	0	0	2	0	29	7		
2010–11	Birkirkara	Maltese Premier League	18	0	1	0	2	0	3	0	24	0		
2011–12	Birkirkara	Maltese Premier League	17	2	0	0	1	0	0	0	18	2		
2012–13	Valletta	Maltese Premier League	12	0	0	0	0	0	4	0	16	0		
2012–13	Sliema Wanderers (loan)	Maltese Premier League	14	2	0	0	0	0	0	0	14	2		
2015–16		Għajnsielem	26	7	0	0	0	0	0	0	14	2		
2015–16	Total	Malta		2	35	1	0	3	0	10	0	258	28	
Career total			270	35	1	0	3	0	10	0	258	28		
