= William Camenzuli =

Maltese footballer (born 1979)

Personal information
- Date of birth: 11 February 1979 (age 47)
- Place of birth: Gżira, Malta
- Height: 5 ft 9 in (1.75 m)
- Position: Defender

Senior career*
Years	Team	Apps	(Gls)
1994–2000	Floriana	88	(2)
2000–2007	Birkirkara	179	(18)
2007–2009	Marsaxlokk	38	(2)
2009–2010	Mosta		
2010–2011	Gudja United		
2012–?	Zebbug Rangers		

International career
- Malta U16
- Malta U18
	Malta U21	25	(2)
2001–2006	Malta	14	(0)
- * Club domestic league appearances and goals

William Camenzuli (born 11 February 1979) is a Maltese former professional footballer who played as a defender.

== Club career ==
=== Floriana ===
Camenzuli was born in Gżira, Malta. He began his career playing for Floriana during the 1994–95 season, throughout the season, he made eight appearances and scored one goal, as Floriana recorded a fourth-place finish in the Maltese Premier League.

Camenzuli went into the 1995–96 season hoping to cement a first team place in the Floriana squad. He went on to make only one appearance without scoring, as Floriana recorded a third-place finish in the Maltese Premier League.

For the 1996–97 season, Camenzuli started to establish himself as a first team regular, he went onto make 13 appearances for the season, but again failed to score, as Floriana again finished in third position in the Maltese Premier League.

The 1997–98 season, was Camenzuli's fourth with Floriana, the club failed to improve on their previous season league finish as they recorded a fifth-place finish in the Maltese Premier League. He made 21 appearances without scoring.

Camenzuli went into the 1998–99 season hoping to help Floriana achieve a higher league position than that of the previous season, however the club again finished in fifth position in the Maltese Premier League. Camenzuli made 21 appearances and scored one goal during the season.

The 1999–2000 season turned out to be Camenzuli's last at Floriana. He made 24 appearances over the season, without scoring, as he helped the club improve on their previous league position, recording a fourth-place finish in the Maltese Premier League.

=== Birkirkara ===
Camenzuli left Floriana and joined fellow Maltese Premier League side Birkirkara for the 2000–01 season, he made 25 appearances and scored two goals in his debut season, as Birkirkara finished in third position in the Maltese Premier League.

The 2001–02 season was Camenzuli's second season with Birkirkara. The club led the way at the halfway point of the season, but following some poor results in the championship pool, Birkirkara finished in third position. Camenzuli made 27 appearances and scored four goals, he also gained his first piece silverware, as the club won the Maltese Cup.

For the 2002–03 season, Camenzuli made 25 appearances and scored seven goals, as Birkirkara improved on their previous finishing position, as they recorded a second-place finish in the Maltese Premier League, he also added another Maltese Cup winners medal to his collection, as Birkirkara retained the trophy, beating Sliema Wanderers in the final.

Camenzuli went into the 2003–04 season hoping to help Birkirkara go one better and win the Maltese Premier League title, however they finished in second position again, with Camenzuli making 26 appearances and chipping in with four goals.

The 2004–05 season was another story of so near, yet so far for Camenzuli, as Birkirkara recorded their third successive second-place finish. During the season, Camenzuli made 26 appearances and scored five goals, he picked up his third Maltese Cup winners medal, as the club beat Msida Saint-Joseph in the final.

The 2005–06 season was Camenzuli's most successful season as a Birkirkara player. He helped the club claim the Maltese Premier League title, making 25 appearances and scoring four goals.

His last season with Birkirkara was the 2006–07 season. During the season Camenzuli made 25 appearances and scored two goals, as Birkirkara finished in third position in the Maltese Premier League.

=== Marsaxlokk ===
On 5 August 2007, Marsaxlokk and Birkirkara reached an agreement over a swap deal which saw Camenzuli join Marsaxlokk and Shaun Bajada would join Birkirkara. Camenzuli made his debut for Marsaxlokk in the 2007–08 season, helping his new club to a second-place finish in the Maltese Premier League that season, making 18 appearances and scoring two goals.

Camenzuli went into the 2008–09 season hoping to help Marsaxlokk gain some more silverware, however the club had an extremely disappointing start to the season by their own high standards, and only managed to gain a place in the championship pool by beating Msida Saint-Joseph in the final game of the first round. Camenzuli made 20 appearances, but failed to score any goals during the season. Despite the club's extremely disappointing start to the season, they managed to finish the season in fourth position in the Maltese Premier League.

For the 2009–10 season, Marsaxlokk were due to play in the Maltese Premier League, however following a guilty verdict on corruption case from the previous season, they were demoted to the Maltese First Division. Camenzuli remained with the club, with the hope he could help the team make a rapid return to the Maltese Premier League.

== International career ==
Camenzuli has gained 14 caps for Malta.

On 14 November 2001, Camenzuli made his international debut for Malta in a friendly match against Canada, a game which Malta went on to win 2–1.

== Career statistics ==
Statistics accurate as of match played 1 August 2009.

Club performance			League		Cup		League Cup		Continental		Total	
Season	Club	League	Apps	Goals	Apps	Goals	Apps	Goals	Apps	Goals	Apps	Goals
Malta			League		Maltese Cup		League Cup		Europe		Total	
1994–95	Floriana	Maltese Premier League	8	1	0	0	0	0	0	0	8	1
1995–96	Floriana	Maltese Premier League	1	0	0	0	0	0	0	0	1	0
1996–97	Floriana	Maltese Premier League	13	0	0	0	0	0	0	0	13	0
1997–98	Floriana	Maltese Premier League	21	0	0	0	0	0	0	0	21	0
1998–99	Floriana	Maltese Premier League	21	1	0	0	0	0	0	0	21	1
1999-00	Floriana	Maltese Premier League	24	0	0	0	0	0	0	0	24	0
2000–01	Birkirkara	Maltese Premier League	25	2	0	0	0	0	0	0	25	2
2001–02	Birkirkara	Maltese Premier League	27	4	0	0	0	0	0	0	27	4
2002–03	Birkirkara	Maltese Premier League	25	7	0	0	0	0	0	0	25	7
2003–04	Birkirkara	Maltese Premier League	26	4	0	0	0	0	0	0	26	4
2004–05	Birkirkara	Maltese Premier League	26	5	0	0	0	0	0	0	26	5
2005–06	Birkirkara	Maltese Premier League	25	4	0	0	0	0	0	0	25	4
2006–07	Birkirkara	Maltese Premier League	25	2	0	0	0	0	0	0	25	2
2007–08	Marsaxlokk	Maltese Premier League	18	2	0	0	0	0	0	0	18	2
2008–09	Marsaxlokk	Maltese Premier League	20	0	0	0	0	0	0	0	20	0
2009–10	Marsaxlokk	Maltese First Division	0	0	0	0	0	0	0	0	0	0
Total	Malta		305	22	0	0	0	0	0	0	305	22
Career total			305	22	0	0	0	0	0	0	305	22

== Honours ==
Birkirkara

- Maltese Premier League: 2005–06
- Maltese Cup: 2002, 2003, 2005

Marsaxlokk

- Maltese First Division: 2009–10
