= Malcolm Licari =

Maltese footballer

Personal information
- Full name: Malcolm Licari
- Date of birth: 18 April 1978 (age 48)
- Place of birth: Pietà, Malta
- Height: 5 ft 10 in (1.78 m)
- Positions: Striker; defender

Youth career
- Floriana
- Cambridge United
- Kirkop United

Senior career*
Years	Team	Apps	(Gls)
1995–2003	Pietà Hotspurs	166	(65)
2003–2011	Marsaxlokk	144	(27)
2011–2012	Floriana	8	(1)
2013	Balzan	15	(2)
2013–2014	Rabat Ajax	40	(8)
2014–2015	Pietà Hotspurs	8	(0)
Total		424	(107)

International career^{‡}
- Malta U16
- Malta U18
	Malta U21	9	(1)
2001–2002	Malta	2	(0)
- * Club domestic league appearances and goals ‡ National team caps and goals as of 15 August 2009

Malcolm Licari (born 18 April 1978 in Pietà, Malta) is a retired professional footballer playing for Pietà Hotspurs, Marsaxlokk, Floriana, Balzan and Rabat Ajax in the Maltese Premier League, where he plays as a striker, and also occasionally as a defender. Malcolm Licari used to be captain of Marsaxlokk before his move to Floriana at the end of 2011.

During the early stages of his career with Pietà Hotspurs, Malcolm was usually employed as a flank player or forward, but later on during his Marsaxlokk career, Licari became primarily a right-sided wingback. He is also a set piece taker, and was often Marsaxlokk's a penalty kick taker.

== Playing career ==
=== Youth career ===
Malcolm represented Floriana at under 16 level, winning the Malta Football Association's Most Promising U16 Player award in 1993–94. The following season, he had a three-month spell with Cambridge United, then went on to play for Kirkop United for six months.

=== Pietà Hotspurs ===
Malcolm joined Pietà Hotspurs for 1995–96 season. Licari spent the season playing in the youth and reserve teams.

In the 1996–97 season, Licari made his Pietà Hotspurs league debut, and almost instantly becoming an automatic choice in the first team. He made 23 appearances during the season, finding the net on seven occasions, helping his team to a 7th-place finish in the Maltese Premier League.

Malcolm went into the 1997–98 season, hoping to help Pietà Hotspurs to a higher league finish, which the club achieved as Pietà Hotspurs recorded a 6th-place finish in the Maltese Premier League, with Licari making 26 appearances and scoring five goals.

For the 1998–99 season, Malcolm helped Pietà Hotspurs to a 7th-place finish in the Maltese Premier League, making 23 appearances and scoring three goals.

Malcolm and Pietà Hotspurs went into the 1999–00 season, again looking to improve on their previous league campaign, and following an impressive season Pietà Hotspurs recorded a creditable 5th-place finish in the Maltese Premier League, with Licari making 27 appearances and notching 12 goals.

For the 2000–01 season, Malcolm helped Pietà Hotspurs to a 7th-place finish in the Maltese Premier League, making 22 appearances and scoring 19 goals.

Malcolm went into the 2001–02 season as one of Pietà Hotspurs most valuable players, and his performances helped Pietà Hotspurs to another 7th-place finish in the Maltese Premier League. During the season Licari made 22 appearances and scored 12 goals.

The 2002–03 season proved to be Malcolm's last as a Pietà Hotspurs player, he helped the club to a 5th-place finish in the Maltese Premier League, making 23 appearances and scoring five goals.

=== Marsaxlokk ===
Malcolm Licari left Pietà Hotspurs and joined fellow Maltese Premier League team Marsaxlokk for the 2003–04 season. He helped his new club to a 4th-place finish in the Maltese Premier League, making 26 appearances and scoring 8 goals.

In Malcolm's second season with Marsaxlokk, the club managed to record a 5th-place finish in the Maltese Premier League for the 2004–05 season, as Licari made 23 appearances and scored four goals.

Licari went into the 2005–06 season, with Marsaxlokk slowly improving, the club went on to record their highest finish in their history, as the finished in 3rd position in Maltese Premier League, with Malcolm making 22 appearances and scoring four goals.

The 2006–07 season was Malcolm's fourth season with Marsaxlokk and proved to be the most successful season in his career. During the season, Licari made 26 appearances, and scored one goal, as Marsaxlokk were crowned as champions of the Maltese Premier League for the first time in the club's history.

For the 2007–08 Marsaxlokk were victims of their own success, and following the previous season's triumph, many of the club's star players moved on to explore different ventures, which left the club short of talent. Licari, however stuck around and despite the club's loss of players, they still managed to record a very creditable 2nd-place finish in the Maltese Premier League, with Malcolm making 22 appearances and scoring seven goals.

Malcolm went into the 2008–09 season hoping to help Marsaxlokk gain some more silverware, however the club had an extremely disappointing start to the season by their own high standards, and only managed to gain a place in the championship pool by beating Msida Saint-Joseph in the final game of the first round. Licari made 25 appearances and scored three goals during the season, and despite the club's extremely disappointing start to the season, they managed to finish the season in 4th position in the Maltese Premier League.

For the 2009–10 season, Marsaxlokk were due to play in the Maltese Premier League, however following a guilty verdict on corruption case from the previous season, Marsaxlokk were demoted to the Maltese First Division, despite this Malcolm stayed with the club.

== International career ==
Licari has gained two caps for Malta.

On 15 August 2001, Malcolm made his international debut for Malta in a friendly match against Bosnia and Herzegovina coming on as a substitute in a 2–0 loss.

Licari picked up his second cap on 1 September 2001, in a 2002 FIFA World Cup qualification match against Bulgaria, again coming on as a substitute, as Malta again lost 2–0.

== Honours ==
=== Marsaxlokk ===
Winner

- 2006/07 Maltese Premier League
- 2009/10 Maltese First Division

Runner Up

- 2004 Maltese Cup

== Career statistics ==
Statistics accurate as of match played 1 August 2009.

Club performance			League		Cup		League Cup		Continental		Total	
Season	Club	League	Apps	Goals	Apps	Goals	Apps	Goals	Apps	Goals	Apps	Goals
Malta			League		Maltese Cup		League Cup		Europe		Total	
1995–96	Pietà Hotspurs	Maltese Premier League	0	0	0	0	0	0	0	0	0	0
1996–97	Pietà Hotspurs	Maltese Premier League	23	7	0	0	0	0	0	0	23	7
1997–98	Pietà Hotspurs	Maltese Premier League	26	5	0	0	0	0	0	0	26	5
1998–99	Pietà Hotspurs	Maltese Premier League	23	5	0	0	0	0	0	0	23	5
1999–00	Pietà Hotspurs	Maltese Premier League	27	12	0	0	0	0	0	0	27	12
2000–01	Pietà Hotspurs	Maltese Premier League	22	19	0	0	0	0	0	0	22	19
2001–02	Pietà Hotspurs	Maltese Premier League	22	12	0	0	0	0	0	0	22	12
2002–03	Pietà Hotspurs	Maltese Premier League	23	5	0	0	0	0	0	0	23	5
2003–04	Marsaxlokk	Maltese Premier League	26	8	0	0	0	0	0	0	26	8
2004–05	Marsaxlokk	Maltese Premier League	23	4	0	0	0	0	0	0	23	4
2005–06	Marsaxlokk	Maltese Premier League	22	4	0	0	0	0	0	0	22	4
2006–07	Marsaxlokk	Maltese Premier League	26	1	0	0	0	0	0	0	26	1
2007–08	Marsaxlokk	Maltese Premier League	22	7	0	0	0	0	0	0	22	7
2008–09	Marsaxlokk	Maltese Premier League	25	3	0	0	0	0	0	0	25	3
2009–10	Marsaxlokk	Maltese First Division	0	0	0	0	0	0	0	0	0	0
Total	Malta		310	92	0	0	0	0	0	0	310	92
Career total			310	92	0	0	0	0	0	0	310	92
