= Brian Said =

Maltese footballer

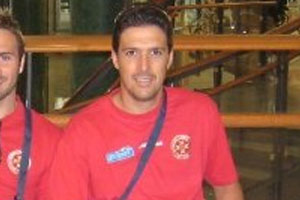

Personal information
- Date of birth: 15 May 1973 (age 53)
- Place of birth: Valletta, Malta
- Position: Defender

Senior career*
Years	Team	Apps	(Gls)
1989–1994	Luxol St. Andrews	51	(10)
1994–1995	→ Birkirkara Luxol (loan)	17	(1)
1995–2001	Floriana	119	(6)
2001–2008	Sliema Wanderers	181	(14)
2008–2009	Marsaxlokk	24	(2)
2009–2011	Floriana	39	(2)
2011-2015	Luxol St. Andrews	86	(5)
Total		517	(40)

International career
1989-1990	Malta U16	7	(1)
1989-1993	Malta U18	3	(0)
1992-1995	Malta U21	22	(0)
1996–2009	Malta	89	(5)
2004–2006	Malta XI	2	(0)
- * Club domestic league appearances and goals

Brian Said (born 15 May 1973) is a Maltese football manager and former player who manages Maltese First Division side St. Andrews, and captain of the Luxol St Andrew's Veteran Team, where he plays as a defender.

== Club career ==
=== St. Andrews ===
Brian Said started his career with St. Andrews, playing regularly in the first team from the 1991–92 season. Early in his career he was used both as a midfielder and as a striker.

In total he recorded 51 appearances with St. Andrews and scored ten goals.

=== Birkirkara ===
Said spent the 1994–95 season on loan with Birkirkara, where he made 17 appearances and scored on one occasion.

=== Floriana ===
Next for Said was a move to Floriana in 1995. Now firmly settled in a central defender, his performances eventually earned him a call-up to the Malta national team.

Said spent six seasons with Floriana from 1995 to 2001, where he recorded 119 appearances and scored six goals for the club.

=== Sliema Wanderers ===
In 2001, Said moved to the ambitious Sliema Wanderers. Now an integral member of the Malta national team, Said became the team's captain, taking over from Noel Turner.

During seven seasons spanning from 2001 to 2008, Said made 181 appearances for The Wanderers, and scored 14 goals.

=== Marsaxlokk ===
In July 2008 it was confirmed that Marsaxlokk had signed Said. It was possible that he would form a partnership with another former Sliema Wanderers defender, in the shape of Carlo Mamo.

Said made his league debut for Marsaxlokk on 24 August 2008, where the side played newly promoted Qormi. Said played the full match, in which both sides shared a 1–1 draw.

During one full season with Marsaxlokk, Said made 24 appearances and scored two goals.

=== Floriana ===
Following Marsaxlokk's relegation to the Maltese First Division, a clause in Said's contract was activated, allowing him to leave the club for free.

On 28 September 2009, it was confirmed that he had joined Floriana for the second time in his career.

== International career ==
Said made his debut for Malta in an August 1996 friendly match away against Iceland, coming on as a 87th-minute substitute for Jeffrey Chetcuti, and earned a total of 91 caps (2 unofficial), scoring 5 goals. His final international was a November 2009 friendly against Bulgaria.

== Style of play ==
Said is tall and strong in the air and can generally compensate for his lack of speed with his ability to read the game. Said is also well known for his contribution to goal scoring, and is often a threat from set pieces.

== Career statistics ==
Scores and results list Malta's goal tally first.

No	Date	Venue	Opponent	Score	Result	Competition
1.	8 September 1999	Ta' Qali National Stadium, Ta' Qali, Malta	Republic of Ireland	1–2	2–3	Euro 2000 qualifier
2.	16 February 2004	Ta' Qali National Stadium, Ta' Qali, Malta	Estonia	2–1	5–2	Rothmans Tournament
3.	8 June 2005	Laugardalsvöllur, Reykjavík, Iceland	Iceland	1–2	1–4	2006 World Cup qualifier
4.	8 September 2007	Ta' Qali National Stadium, Ta' Qali, Malta	Turkey	1–0	2–2	Euro 2008 qualifier
5.	26 March 2008	Ta' Qali National Stadium, Ta' Qali, Malta	Liechtenstein	7–1	7–1	Friendly match

== Honours ==
- Maltese Premier League: 3

2003, 2004, 2005

- FA Trophy: 2

2004, 2011
