= Joseph Attard =

Maltese football referee

- Full name: Joseph Attard
- Born: 1 July 1965 (age 61); Malta

International
Years	League	Role
1997-2010	FIFA	Referee

Joseph Attard (born 1 July 1965), is a Maltese former football referee who was a listed international referee from 1997 to 2010.

He started as the assistant referee during the 1998 FIFA World Cup qualification in France between Georgia and Moldova on 7 June 1997.

He was promoted to a referee on 1 September 2001, where he was summoned to officiated the match between Wales and Armenia.

In 2008, Attard and Albanian coach Ilir Pelinku were charged for bribing a goalkeeper Saviour Darmanin before the match and match manipulation. They appeared and arranged in court in May 2009.

On 12 November 2010, Attard was found guilty of breaching Article 10 of the association's regulations, FIFA and the Malta Football Association’s Board to Investigate Corrupt Practices banned Attard for life in football activities.

On 21 February 2012, Attard and Pelinku were convicted of bribery and match manipulation.
