= Luke Dimech =

Maltese footballer (born 1977)

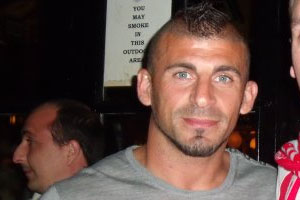

Personal information
- Full name: Luke Anthony Dimech
- Date of birth: 11 January 1977 (age 49)
- Place of birth: Floriana, Malta
- Height: 5 ft 11 in (1.80 m)
- Position: Centre-back

Youth career
- Lincoln City

Senior career*
Years	Team	Apps	(Gls)
1995–2001	Sliema Wanderers	133	(3)
2002	Shamrock Rovers	16	(0)
2003	Birkirkara	10	(0)
2003–2005	Mansfield Town	45	(1)
2005–2006	Chester City	30	(0)
2006–2007	Marsaxlokk	26	(0)
2007–2008	Macclesfield Town	26	(0)
2008–2010	Valletta	47	(2)
2010–2012	AEK Larnaca	43	(0)
2012–2013	Mosta	14	(0)
2013–2015	Valletta	64	(3)
2015–2016	Sliema Wanderers	24	(0)

International career
	Malta U21	14	(0)
1999–2013	Malta	78	(1)
- * Club domestic league appearances and goals

Luke Anthony Dimech (born 11 January 1977) is a former Maltese professional football defender.

== Club career ==
=== Sliema Wanderers ===
Born in Floriana, Malta, Dimech began his career playing for Sliema Wanderers. Luke's first season was the 1995–96 season and instantly gained silverware when the club won the Maltese Premier League.

Luke spent seven seasons with the club and even managed establishing himself in the Maltese national team in 1999, in total Dimech made 133 appearances and scored on three occasions during his time with the club.

=== Shamrock Rovers ===
After many impressive displays Luke moved to Ireland to join Shamrock Rovers for one season, making his debut on 2 September 2002. He was sent off in his fourth appearance. He proceeded to make a total of 16 appearances, but after falling out of favour with the club, Luke left Dublin. He played in the 2002 FAI Cup Final.

=== Birkirkara ===
Dimech returned to Malta joining up with Birkirkara in 2003, and made 10 appearances with the club, and won the F.A Trophy.

=== Mansfield Town ===
Another good season in the Maltese League saw Dimech on the move again, this time he joined English side Mansfield Town in August 2003.

Dimech initially signed a one-year deal with the club for the 2003–04 season, scoring once against Leyton Orient. The season finished in disappointment when Mansfield Town were beaten in the League Two play-off final on penalties to Huddersfield Town. Despite losing the play-off final Dimech signed a 1 year contract extension.

Dimech's second season with Mansfield Town was quite indifferent in the early part of the season; Keith Curle was sacked and replaced by Carlton Palmer. Dimech carried the good form he enjoyed the following season and cemented a place in the heart of the defence, Dimech did not enjoy the best of second halves of the season and after falling out of favour with Carlton Palmer, Dimech was released at the end of the 2004–05 season. In two seasons with Mansfield Town, Dimech made 45 appearances and scored one goal.

=== Chester City ===
His next move was onto another English club, Chester City on a free transfer in July 2005 on a one-year contract. His manager was once again Keith Curle and his central defensive partner was David Artell, who moved with him from Mansfield.

Dimech was a regular in the heart of the Chester City defence and made 30 appearances during the 2005–06 season. Having only a one-year contract at the club and an indifferent second half to the season meant that Luke was released when his contract expired.

=== Marsaxlokk ===
Dimech then returned to his homeland joining Marsaxlokk in 2006 in time for the new season. He has also captained the side during the season, in the absence of Carlo Mamo. He was also still a major part of the Malta national team setup, forming a strong partnership alongside veteran Brian Said.

Following Marsaxlokk triumph in the league, and the end of the players contract, Dimech decided not to renew and instead decided to search for a club elsewhere in Europe, thought to be England.

=== Macclesfield Town ===
On 19 July 2007, Dimech signed a one-year deal with manager Ian Brightwell to join League Two side Macclesfield Town and was re-united with Carl Regan who he played alongside in Chester City's defence.

Dimech made his Macclesfield Town debut on the opening day of the League Two season away to Bradford City on 11 August 2007, in which the game finished 1–1. Three days later Luke made his home debut in the first round tie of Football League Cup against League One outfit Leeds United, the game finished 1–0 to Leeds, thanks to 78th-minute goal from Ian Westlake.

On 31 January 2008, Dimech and Carl Regan's partnership came to an end as Regan joined former Macclesfield-manager Paul Ince at Milton Keynes Dons. As one of Dimech's former Chester teammates left the club, another one arrived in the shape of Sean Hessey who joined the club on a season long loan from Chester City, and is likely to fill the void left by the departing Regan.

On 18 May 2008, Dimech and four other Macclesfield Town players were released by manager Keith Alexander. During his time with Macclesfield Town, Dimech made 26 appearances, but did not find the net.

=== Valletta F.C. ===
On 20 May 2008, Dimech signed for Valletta F.C. On 24 May 2010, Dimech was released by Valletta F.C following an incident in a Championship Pool game against Sliema Wanderers in April. Some Valletta supporters were critical towards him when the players were leaving the pitch at half time, and he responded by taking off his shirt and putting it on the pitch. This earned him a second yellow card in the game, and a club suspension before the club eventually decided to release him. In all he made 47 appearances and scored 2 goals. Dimech rejoined Valletta for a loan spell from Mosta fc in the January transfer window Season 2012/2013.

=== AEK Larnaca ===
On 25 June 2010, Dimech signed for AEK Larnaca. He was a well regarded and important player for the team. In August 2011, Dimech helped his club AEK Larnaca to reach the group stage of the UEFA Europa League, after beating Rosenborg 2–1 on aggregate, and was the first Maltese player to play in the group stages of a major competition.

== International career ==
=== Malta ===
Dimech is a regular in the Maltese national team and to date has 78 caps with one goal. He began playing for Malta on 28 April 1999 when he made his debut against Iceland. When John Buttigieg took over the Maltese national team in 2009, there was apparently some sort of disagreement over Dimech's hairstyle, leading to Dimech being excluded from the squad. Later in the season he officially retired from the national team. In 2012, he came out of international retirement and joined the national team again.

=== International goals ===
Malta Goals

#	Date	Venue	Opponent	Score	Result	Competition
1.	30 April 2003	Ta' Qali Stadium, Ta' Qali, Malta	Cyprus	1–2	1–2	UEFA Euro 2004 qualifying

== Personal life ==
Dimech has a younger brother, Mark, who plays in England for Basford United in the Nottinghamshire Senior League, and is also the team's captain. His older brother, Kris Dimech, used to play for Gedling Southbank and is now the team manager.

== Honours ==
Sliema Wanderers

- Maltese Premier League: 1995–96
- F.A. Trophy: 1999–00

Marsaxlokk

- Maltese Premier League: 2006–07

Valletta

- Maltese Premier League: 2013–14
- FA Trophy: 2013–14
