= Udo Nwoko =

Maltese footballer

Personal information
- Full name: Udochukwu Nwoko
- Date of birth: 15 October 1984 (age 42)
- Place of birth: Abia, Nigeria
- Height: 1.70 m (5 ft 7 in)
- Position: Attacking midfielder

Youth career
- Hibernians

Senior career*
Years	Team	Apps	(Gls)
2002–2003	Hibernians	19	(5)
2004–2005	Xewkija Tigers	25	(18)
2005–2006	Mosta	27	(10)
2006–2007	Hibernians	17	(5)
2007	→ Marsaxlokk	18	(3)
2007–2009	Leixões S.C.	29	(7)
2009	Náutico	0	(0)
2009–2010	Panthrakikos	9	(2)
2010	Doxa Katokopia	18	(4)
2010–2011	Pas Hamedan	15	(6)
2012	Neath	12	(2)
2012–2013	Hibernians	8	(0)
2013	Floriana	11	(1)
2014–2015	Gudja United		
2015–2016	St. George's		
2017	MFK Topvar Topoľčany	8	(1)
2017–2018	MEAP Nisou	12	(1)

International career
2007–2010	Malta	15	(2)
- * Club domestic league appearances and goals as of 29 June 2014

Udochukwu Nwoko (born 15 October 1984) is a retired professional footballer who last played for Cypriot Third Division side MEAP Nisou as a midfielder. Born in Nigeria, he represented the Malta national team.

== Playing career ==
Born in Abia, Nigeria, Nwoko moved to Malta at the age of 14 in the hope that it could one day lead him to one of the top leagues in Europe. He started his career at Hibernians. His main break came during the 2002–03 season, where he made 16 appearances for the club, but failed to find the net.

He then moved to Xewkija Tigers of the Gozo Football League in 2004, and transformed into a predator in front of goal. Nwoko hit 18 goals in just 25 appearances, and became one of the hottest prospects in Maltese football.

Following the successful spell with Xewkija Tigers, Nwoko found himself back in the Maltese Premier League joining Mosta for the 2005–06 season. He made 27 appearances and scored 10 goals for the club, but it wasn't enough to save the club, and they were relegated by the difference of a point.

Despite the relegation, Nwoko's form hadn't gone unnoticed and was re-signed by his first club Hibernians for the 2006–07 season, getting another chance to play in the Maltese Premier League. He made 17 appearances with the club and scored 5 goal.

He then moved on loan to fellow Maltese Premier League side Marsaxlokk for the remainder of 2007. He made 18 appearances, and score 3 goals; he did however finish the season as a part of the 2006–07 championship-winning squad and won his first ever Maltese Premier League.

In 2007, he moved to Portuguese club Leixões, where he marked his debut with a goal against giants Benfica. He was linked to a £1.25m transfer to the Premiership club Reading in January 2008, but an unfortunate injury at the short transfer window stopped the transfer. . Nwoko recently terminated his contract with Portuguese club Leixoes. He signed a short contract with a Brazilian top league club, on 21 March 2009 Clube Náutico Capibaribe in Brazil. In summer 2009, he signed for Panthrakikos F.C. in the Greek Super League, and left at the end of the season when the club was relegated. In January 2010, he signed for Doxa Katokopia in the Cypriot First Division, staying there for just 6 months before in June 2010, he signed for Pas Hamedan in the Iran Pro League.

He signed for Floriana in January 2013. On 27 June 2014 he signed with Gudja United. After one season with Gudja he signed a one-year contract with St. George's on 15 July 2015.

On 17 March 2017 Udo signed with MFK Topvar Topoľčany from the 3. Liga in Slovakia. He won 8 caps and scored 1 goal.

== International career ==
Nwoko was called up by Malta for the first time ahead of a UEFA Euro 2008 qualifying matches against Hungary in Budapest on 13 October 2007 and also played at home to Moldova four days later. He was available for selection after being granted Maltese citizenship in August 2007.

== Honours ==
- Maltese Premier League (1):
  - 2006–07
