= Camenzuli =

Camenzuli is a surname. Notable people with the surname include:

- Ryan Camenzuli (born 1994), Maltese footballer
- William Camenzuli (born 1979), Maltese footballer
