= Nuno Gomes (footballer, born 1979) =

Portuguese footballer

Personal information
- Full name: Nuno Miguel dos Santos Gomes
- Date of birth: 6 December 1979 (age 46)
- Place of birth: Porto, Portugal
- Height: 1.85 m (6 ft 1 in)
- Position: Centre-back

Youth career
- 1990–1998: Boavista

Senior career*
Years	Team	Apps	(Gls)
1998–1999	Marco	25	(2)
1999–2000	Aves	2	(0)
2000–2002	Gondomar	59	(6)
2002–2003	Boavista	0	(0)
2003–2004	Paredes	16	(0)
2004–2005	Verín	36	(4)
2005–2006	Marsaxlokk	21	(1)
2006–2007	Vaslui	2	(0)
2007–2008	Fostiras	3	(0)
Total		164	(13)

International career
1996	Portugal U16	10	(1)
1997	Portugal U17	3	(0)
1997	Portugal U18	1	(0)
- * Club domestic league appearances and goals

Nuno Miguel dos Santos Gomes (born 6 December 1979) is a Portuguese former professional footballer who played as a central defender.

== Club career ==
Gomes was born in Porto. A Boavista F.C. youth graduate who never played for its first team – or in the country's Primeira Liga – he plied the vast majority of his trade in the lower leagues of Portugal, Spain and Greece. His only two top-division experiences came with Marsaxlokk F.C. in the Maltese Premier League and FC Vaslui, appearing in just two Liga I games in his only season with the latter club.

Gomes retired from football at the age of only 28.
