= Nikolai Muscat =

Maltese footballer

Personal information
- Full name: Nikolai Muscat
- Date of birth: 13 July 1996 (age 30)
- Place of birth: Malta
- Position: Midfielder

Team information
- Current team: Marsaxlokk
- Number: 6

Senior career*
Years	Team	Apps	(Gls)
2013–2017	San Ġwann		
2017–2023	Gżira United	140	(9)
2023–	Marsaxlokk	81	(6)

International career^{‡}
2018	Malta U20	1	(0)
2018	Malta U21	2	(0)
2019–	Malta	12	(0)
- * Club domestic league appearances and goals as of 7 May 2026 ‡ National team caps and goals as of 7 September 2024

Nikolai Muscat (born 13 July 1996) is a Maltese footballer who plays as a midfielder for Marsaxlokk and the Malta national team.

== Career ==
Muscat made his international debut for Malta on 18 November 2019 in a UEFA Euro 2020 qualifying match against Norway, which finished as a 1–2 home loss.

== Career statistics ==
=== International ===
As of 26 March 2023

Malta
Year	Apps	Goals
2019	1	0
2021	2	0
2022	1	0
2023	1	0
Total	5	0
