= Oualid El Hasni =

Tunisian footballer (born 1993)

Personal information
- Date of birth: 9 August 1993 (age 33)
- Place of birth: Cannes, France
- Height: 1.92 m (6 ft 4 in)
- Positions: Centre-back; right-back

Team information
- Current team: Marsaxlokk
- Number: 4

Youth career
- 1998–2009: Cannes
- 2009–2011: Werder Bremen

Senior career*
Years	Team	Apps	(Gls)
2013–2016	Vicenza	33	(0)
2015	→ Monza (loan)	15	(0)
2016–2017	Étoile du Sahel	1	(0)
2017–2018	Triestina	23	(0)
2018–2019	UTA Arad	24	(1)
2019	→ UTA Arad II	0	(0)
2019–2021	Stade Tunisien	27	(1)
2021–2025	Floriana	97	(7)
2025–	Marsaxlokk	26	(2)

International career
2013	Tunisia U23	1	(0)
- * Club domestic league appearances and goals as of 7 May 2026

Oualid El Hasni (born 9 August 1993) is a Tunisian professional footballer who plays as a defender for Maltese Premier League club Marsaxlokk.

== Career ==
El Hasni progressed through the AS Cannes youth system before joining German club Werder Bremen's U17 team.

On 2 February 2015, El Hasni was signed by Monza in a temporary deal.

In August 2017, he joined Triestina, newly promoted to Serie C, from Étoile du Sahel.
