= Lino Galea =

Maltese footballer

Personal information
- Full name: Angelo Galea
- Date of birth: 26 March 1976 (age 50)
- Place of birth: Malta
- Position: Defender

Senior career*
Years	Team	Apps	(Gls)
1992–1997	Valletta	47	(1)
1997–2001	Sliema Wanderers	77	(3)
2001–2008	Birkirkara	170	(6)
2008–2009	Tarxien Rainbows	10	(0)

International career^{‡}
- Malta U16
- Malta U18
- Malta U21
1997–2001	Malta	4	(0)
- * Club domestic league appearances and goals as of 15 July 2009 ‡ National team caps and goals as of 15 July 2009

Angelo Galea (born 26 March 1976 in Malta) is a retired professional footballer. He played as defender.

== Playing career ==
Angelo "Lino" Galea played for Valletta, Sliema Wanderers, Birkirkara and Tarxien Rainbows and was once a Maltese international. Galea won the 2005 and 2008 Maltese Cups with Bikirkara.
