= 2003–04 Maltese FA Trophy =

Tournament details
- Country: Malta

Final positions
- Champions: Sliema Wanderers (19th title)
- Runners-up: Marsaxlokk

The 2003–04 Maltese FA Trophy was the 66th season since its establishment. The competition started on 1 November 2003 and ended on 18 May 2004 with the final, which Sliema Wanderers won 2-0 against Marsaxlokk.

== First round ==
Team 1	Score	Team 2
1 November 2003
Marsaxlokk	1–0	St. Patrick
San Gwann	2–3 (a.e.t.)	Msida St. Joseph
8 November 2003
Hamrun Spartans	3–0	Marsa
Pietà Hotspurs	2–0	Senglea Athletic
15 November 2003
Mosta	4–1	Naxxar Lions
Lija Athletic	2–0	Mqabba
22 November 2003
Rabat Ajax	1–3	Balzan Youths
Tarxien Rainbows	0–1	Floriana

== Second round ==
Team 1	Score	Team 2
21 February 2004
Floriana	1–0	Balzan Youths
Pietà Hotspurs	1–3	Marsaxlokk
22 February 2004
Mosta	3–1	Lija Athletic
1 March 2004
Msida St. Joseph	2–1	Hamrun Spartans

== Quarter-finals ==
Team 1	Score	Team 2
3 April 2004
Msida St. Joseph	0–1	Sliema Wanderers
Valletta	1–0	Floriana
4 April 2004
Mosta	0–5	Birkirkara
Hibernians	1–4	Marsaxlokk

== Semi-finals ==
12 May 2004	Marsaxlokk	1–0 (a.e.t.)	Valletta	Ta' Qali
	Bogdanović 115'	Report		Stadium: Ta' Qali National Stadium; Referee: Chris Lautier

13 May 2004	Sliema Wanderers	2–1	Birkirkara	Ta' Qali
	Giglio 29'; Mifsud 68'	Report	Dronca 76' (pen.)	Stadium: Ta' Qali National Stadium; Referee: Joe Attard

== Final ==
18 May 2004

Marsaxlokk	0–2	Sliema Wanderers
	Report	Brincat 29'; Giglio 86'

Ta' Qali National Stadium, Ta' Qali
Referee: Adrian Casha
