= Cleavon Frendo =

Maltese footballer

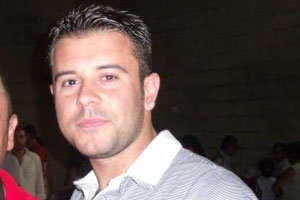

Personal information
- Full name: Cleavon Frendo
- Date of birth: 1 July 1985 (age 41)
- Place of birth: Pietà, Malta
- Height: 5 ft 4 in (1.63 m)
- Position: Winger

Youth career
- Torino

Senior career*
Years	Team	Apps	(Gls)
2000–2004	Pietà Hotspurs	50	(10)
2002–2003	→ Lija Athletic (loan)	9	(2)
2004–2008	Marsaxlokk	79	(23)
2008–2020	Valletta	20	(2)
2010–2011	→ Qormi F.C. (loan)	20	(6)
2011–2012	→ Sliema Wanderers (loan)	22	(3)
2012–2013	→ Pietà Hotspurs (loan)	15	(1)
2013–2014	→ Pietà Hotspurs (loan)	13	(3)
2014–2015	→ Lija Athletic (loan)	21	(5)
2015–2016	→ Marsa (loan)	22	(3)
2016–2017	→ Attard (loan)	12	(0)
2017	→ Fgura United (loan)	12	(4)
2017–2018	→ Fgura United (loan)	11	(4)
2018–2019	→ Marsaxlokk (loan)	27	(3)
2019–2020	→ Mtarfa (loan)	13	(1)
2020–2021	Mtarfa	6	(0)

International career^{‡}
- Malta U17
- Malta U19
	Malta U21	19	(2)
2004–2008	Malta	9	(1)
- * Club domestic league appearances and goals as of 30 June 2012 ‡ National team caps and goals as of 19 July 2020

Cleavon Frendo (born 1 July 1985 in Pietà, Malta) is a professional footballer who plays as a winger.

== Playing career ==
Cleavon started his professional career in 2000 at Pieta Hotspurs, after returning from Torino in Italy. He was loaned to Lija Athletic for the 2002–03 season. He then joined Marsaxlokk, and won the 2006–07 season of the Maltese Premier League.

In June 2008, Cleavon along with his Marsaxlokk teammate Jamie Pace left the 2006–07 champions to join the 2007–08 champions Valletta.

Frendo made his league debut for Valletta on 25 August 2008, coming on as a 76th-minute substitute for fellow new recruit Marcelo Peabirú in a 1–1 draw with Sliema Wanderers.

Cleavon's first goal for Valletta came ironically against his former club, Marsaxlokk, on 20 December 2008, when he tapped in a rebound in the 44th minute from an initial shot by Gilbert Agius that had hit the post. Valletta went on to win the match 1–0. For the 2011–12 season, he joined Sliema Wanderers.

== Honours ==
Marsaxlokk

- Maltese Premier League: 2006–07
