= Rufin Oba =

Congolese retired footballer (born 1976)

Personal information
- Full name: Rufin Christophe Oba Swing
- Date of birth: 20 February 1976 (age 50)
- Place of birth: Brazzaville, Republic of the Congo
- Position: Forward

Senior career*
Years	Team	Apps	(Gls)
1997-2002	Floriana	114	(42)
2003	Birkirkara	9	(0)
2005-2006	Floriana	8	(0)
2006-2007	Qala Saints		

International career
1993–1995	Congo	7	(1)
- * Club domestic league appearances and goals

Rufin Oba (born 20 February 1976 in the Republic of the Congo) is a Congolese retired footballer who last played for Birkirkara of the Maltese Premier League in 2003.

== Malta ==
Spending three years with Floriana of the Maltese Premier League, Oba was the leading goal-scorer in the 2000–01 Maltese Premier League season with 12 goals. He agreed to join rivals Birkirkara in 2003 and was unveiled late January that year despite being contacted by Floriana. However, Sliema Wanderers impugned the Congolese attacker's transfer to Birkirkara, saying that it violated regulations. By June, he had prematurely ended his three-year contract with the club, with Moroccan mentor Karim Bencherifa planning to take him to Brunei in 2004.

== International ==
In January 1995, Oba scored a goal in a 1996 African Cup of Nations qualifier as Republic of Congo lost 1–2 to Ghana.
