= Jamie Pace =

Footballer (born 1977)

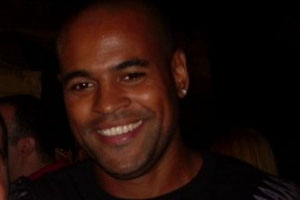

Personal information
- Full name: Jamie Pace MacDonald
- Date of birth: 1 January 1977 (age 49)
- Place of birth: Hammersmith, England
- Position: Midfielder

Senior career*
Years	Team	Apps	(Gls)
1995–1998	Tooting & Mitcham	72	(42)
1998–1999	Sutton United	23	(16)
1999–2000	Barton Rovers	51	(21)
2000–2001	Carshalton Athletic	18	(6)
2001–2003	Pietà Hotspurs	44	(8)
2003	→ Sliema Wanderers (loan)	10	(0)
2004	→ Valletta (loan)	7	(1)
2004–2008	Marsaxlokk	77	(7)
2008–2013	Valletta	52	(8)
2012–2013	→ Balzan (loan)	20	(1)

International career
2005–2011	Malta	48	(3)
- * Club domestic league appearances and goals

Jamie Pace MacDonald (born 1 January 1977) is a retired professional footballer who played as a midfielder. Born in England, he played for the Malta national team at international level.

== Club career ==
Pace joined Marsaxlokk in 2005 from Valletta, during his time in Malta he has also played for Sliema Wanderers and Pietà Hotspurs. He played with various clubs in London before coming to Malta including 1997–98 with Barton Rovers making 51 appearances and scoring 21 goals, Tooting & Mitcham during 1999–2001. Pace had his first trial with Crystal Palace at the age of 17.

== International career ==
Pace had a three-way option of which nation he wished to play his international football for. He could have chosen England, his country of birth, through his Maltese mother Maria-Teresa Pace or Jamaica through his father (the late Keith McDonald), who played for Chelsea. Jamie is the first cousin of ex under-21 Malta international and Marsaxlokk left back Andrew Spiteri.

Pace decided to declare his nationality to Malta after he settled in Malta and learnt the language. In 2005, he received a call up to join the Malta national team, and made his debut on 9 February 2005 against Norway.

== Career statistics ==
Scores and results list Malta's goal tally first, score column indicates score after each Pace goal.

List of international goals scored by Jamie Pace
No.	Date	Venue	Opponent	Score	Result	Competition
1	2 September 2006	Ta' Qali Stadium, Ta' Qali, Malta	Bosnia and Herzegovina	1–1	2–5	UEFA Euro 2008 qualifying
2	23 March 2008	Ta' Qali Stadium, Ta' Qali, Malta	Liechtenstein	4–0	7–1	Friendly
3	2 September 2010	Ramat Gan Stadium, Ramat Gan, Israel	Israel	1–1	1–3	UEFA Euro 2012 qualifying

== Honours ==
Marsaxlokk

- Maltese Premier League: 2006–07

Valletta

- Maltese Premier League: 2010–11
