= Saviour Darmanin =

Maltese footballer

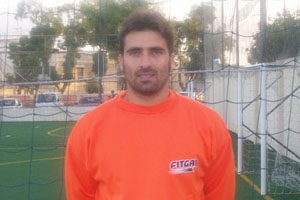

Personal information
- Full name: Saviour Darmanin
- Date of birth: 7 February 1977 (age 49)
- Place of birth: Vittoriosa, Malta
- Height: 6 ft 2 in (1.88 m)
- Position: Goalkeeper

Youth career
- Pietà Hotspurs

Senior career*
Years	Team	Apps	(Gls)
1994–2004	Pietà Hotspurs	203	(0)
2005	Birkirkara	10	(0)
2005	Vauxhall Motors	6	(0)
2006	Għajnsielem	19	(0)
2006–2008	Valletta	34	(0)
2008–2009	Marsaxlokk	9	(0)
Total		281	(0)

International career^{‡}
1996–2000	Malta U21	13	(0)
2002–2005	Malta	6	(0)

Managerial career
- 2009: Vittoriosa Stars (assistant coach)
- * Club domestic league appearances and goals as of 30 October 2009 ‡ National team caps and goals as of 30 October 2009

Saviour Darmanin (born 7 February 1977 in Pietà, Malta) is a Maltese retired footballer, who was most recently working with Maltese First Division side Vittoriosa Stars, where he was the club's assistant manager. During his career, he played as a goalkeeper. Saviour is remembered for being part of the Valletta squad that beat Juventus in 2008, where he saved a shot to win Valletta the game in the penalty shoot-out. He now runs his own goalkeeping school in Malta.

== Honours ==
Valletta

Winner

- 1994–95 Maltese First Division
- 2002–03 Carlsberg Tournament
- 2004–05 Maltese FA Trophy
- 2005–06 Gozo Freedom Cup
- 2008–09 Maltese Premier League
- 2008–09 Bet Fair Cup vs Juventus

Malta National Team

Winner

- 2003–04 Rothmans International Tournament
