= Haruna Doda =

Nigerian footballer

Personal information
- Full name: Haruna Doda
- Date of birth: January 16, 1975 (age 51)
- Place of birth: Lagos, Nigeria
- Height: 6 ft 0 in (1.83 m)
- Positions: Midfielder; striker

Team information
- Current team: Zebbug Rangers
- Number: 8
1992–1994	Steel Pioneers		
1994–1998	Safa Sporting Club		
1998–1999	Enugu Rangers		
1999–2000	Belenenses	24	(1)
2000–2001	Santa Clara	16	(3)
2001–2003	C.D. Aves	33	(6)
2003–2005	Birkirkara	39	(20)
2005–2006	Hibernians	26	(10)
2006–2007	Marsaxlokk	25	(8)
2007–2009	St. Patrick	42	(19)
2009–2010	Dingli Swallows	16	(0)
2010–	Zebbug Rangers	19	(3)
2023–	Mellieha S.C.		

International career^{‡}
Years	Team	Apps	(Gls)
2000–2002	Nigeria	4	(0)
- ‡ National team caps and goals as of May 24, 2010

Haruna Doda (born 16 January 1975 in Lagos, Nigeria) is a professional footballer who used to play for Maltese Second Division side Zebbug Rangers, where he played as a midfielder.
