= 1999–2000 Maltese Premier League =

Football competition

Maltese Premier League
- Season: 1999–2000
- Dates: 24 August 1999 – 29 April 2000
- Champions: Birkirkara (1st title)
- Relegated: Gozo; Żurrieq
- Champions League: Birkirkara
- UEFA Cup: Sliema Wanderers; Valletta
- UEFA Intertoto Cup: Floriana
- Matches played: 132
- Goals scored: 462 (3.5 per match)
- Top goalscorer: Michael Mifsud (21 goals)

The 1999–2000 Maltese Premier League (known as the Rothmans Premier League for sponsorship reasons) was the 20th season of the Maltese Premier League, and the 85th season of top-tier football in Malta. It was contested by 10 teams, and Birkirkara F.C. won the championship.

== Teams ==
Locations of the 1999–2000 Maltese Premier League teams

The following teams were promoted from the First Division at the start of the season:

- Gozo
- Żurrieq

From the previous Premier League season, the following teams were relegated to the First Division:

- St. Patrick
- Ħamrun Spartans

== First phase ==
=== League table ===
Pos	Team	Pld	W	D	L	GF	GA	GD	Pts	Qualification
1	Birkirkara	18	15	2	1	39	9	+30	47	Qualification for the Top Six
2	Valletta	18	13	1	4	58	22	+36	40	Qualification for the Top Six
3	Floriana	18	11	1	6	35	24	+11	34	Qualification for the Top Six
4	Sliema Wanderers	18	10	3	5	41	23	+18	33	Qualification for the Top Six
5	Pietà Hotspurs	18	7	5	6	33	36	−3	26	Qualification for the Top Six
6	Hibernians	18	5	7	6	28	25	+3	22	Qualification for the Top Six
7	Naxxar Lions	18	4	4	10	27	40	−13	16	Qualification for the Play-out
8	Gozo	18	3	5	10	14	29	−15	14	Qualification for the Play-out
9	Żurrieq	18	3	3	12	20	55	−35	12	Qualification for the Play-out
10	Rabat Ajax	18	2	3	13	19	51	−32	9	Qualification for the Play-out

Source: RSSSF

=== Results ===
Home \ Away	BKR	FRN	GZO	HIB	NXR	PTA	RBT	SLM	VLT	ŻRQ
Birkirkara	—	2–1	2–0	2–0	5–2	3–1	4–0	2–1	2–0	2–0
Floriana	0–1	—	5–1	2–0	2–0	2–2	4–3	1–0	3–1	3–2
Gozo	1–0	0–1	—	1–1	0–0	0–0	1–1	1–2	0–2	1–0
Hibernians	0–0	0–1	3–1	—	3–3	2–2	3–0	1–1	3–2	1–2
Naxxar Lions	1–5	3–0	2–1	0–0	—	2–3	2–3	2–3	2–4	3–0
Pietà Hotspurs	0–1	3–2	2–3	1–4	1–0	—	2–1	0–0	2–5	2–1
Rabat Ajax	0–2	1–4	2–1	0–3	2–3	2–2	—	0–2	0–9	1–3
Sliema Wanderers	0–1	2–1	4–1	3–3	3–0	2–3	3–1	—	1–3	5–0
Valletta	1–1	2–1	1–0	2–0	3–0	5–3	2–1	1–2	—	9–1
Żurrieq	1–4	1–2	1–1	2–1	2–2	1–4	1–1	2–7	0–6	—

Source: RSSSF
Legend: Blue = home team win; Yellow = draw; Red = away team win.

== Second phase ==
=== Top Six ===
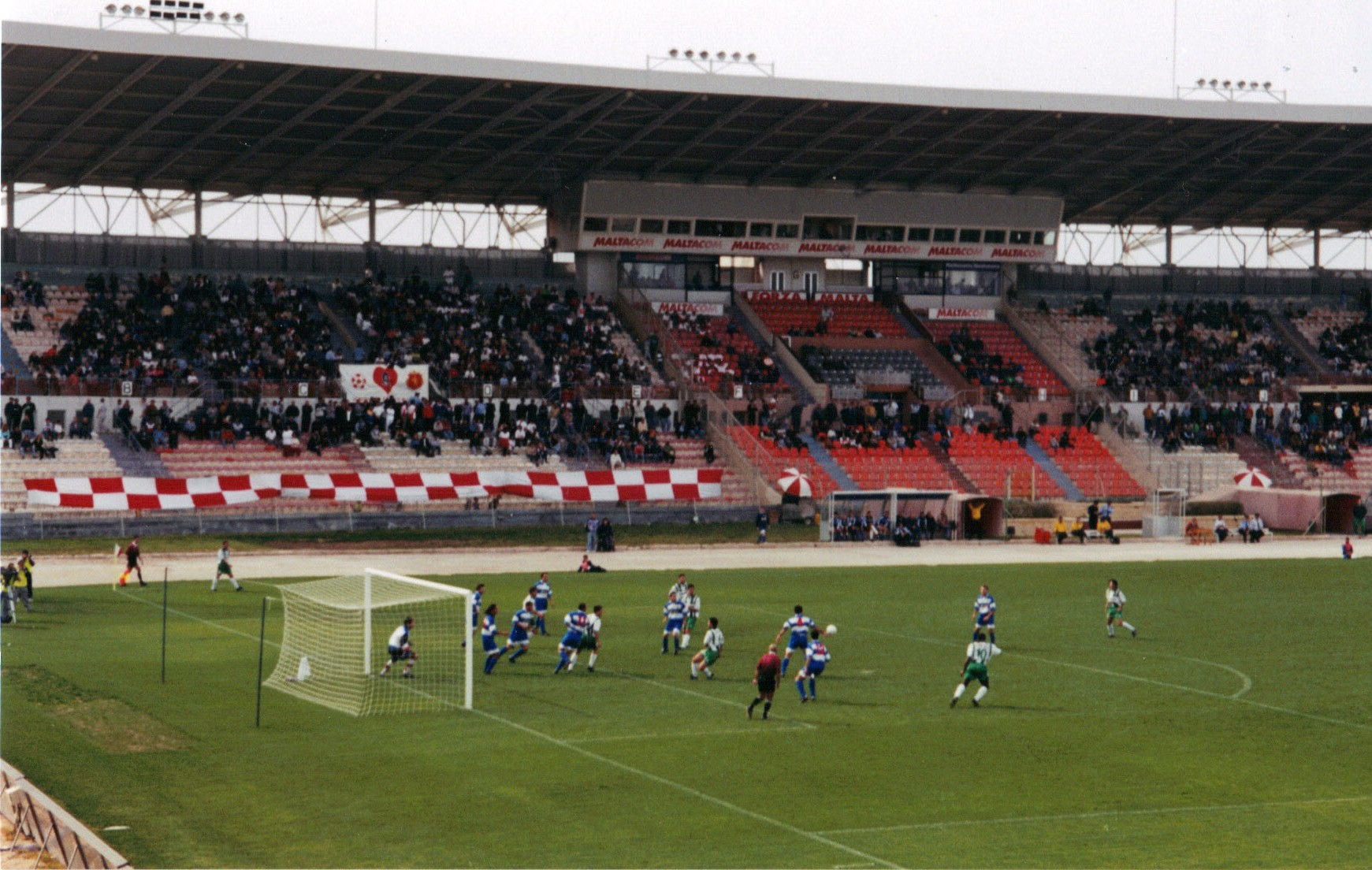
Floriana-Pieta Hotspurs at Ta'Qali

The teams placed in the first six positions in the league table qualified for the Top Six, and the points obtained during the first phase were halved (and rounded up) before the start of second phase. As a result, the teams started with the following points before the second phase: Birkirkara 24 points, Valletta 20, Floriana 17, Sliema Wanderers 17, Pietà Hotspurs 13 and Hibernians 11.

Pos	Team	Pld	W	D	L	GF	GA	GD	Pts	Qualification	BKR	SLM	VLT	FRN	PTA	HIB
1	Birkirkara (C)	10	7	1	2	22	5	+17	46	Qualification for the 2000–01 UEFA Champions League	—	2–0	2–1	1–1	5–0	0–1
2	Sliema Wanderers	10	7	1	2	21	13	+8	39	Qualification for the 2000–01 UEFA Cup	0–2	—	0–0	2–1	2–0	2–1
3	Valletta	10	5	1	4	17	14	+3	36	Qualification for the 2000–01 UEFA Cup	1–5	1–2	—	3–0	4–2	2–1
4	Floriana	10	3	1	6	15	20	−5	27	Qualification for the 2000 UEFA Intertoto Cup	0–3	4–5	0–2	—	2–0	3–0
5	Pietà Hotspurs	10	3	0	7	12	21	−9	22		1–0	0–3	0–2	2–3	—	4–0
6	Hibernians	10	3	0	7	9	23	−14	20		0–2	2–5	2–1	2–1	0–3	—

Source: RSSSF
(C) Champions

=== Play-out ===
The teams which finished in the last four league positions were placed in the play-out and at the end of the phase the two lowest-placed teams were relegated to the First Division. The points obtained during the first phase were halved (and rounded up) before the start of second phase. As a result, the teams started with the following points before the second phase: Naxxar Lions 8 points, Gozo 7, Zurrieq 6, Rabat Ajax 5.

Pos	Team	Pld	W	D	L	GF	GA	GD	Pts	Relegation	NXR	RBT	GZO	ŻRQ
7	Naxxar Lions	6	4	1	1	17	9	+8	21		—	3–3	1–0	6–2
8	Rabat Ajax	6	3	3	0	15	11	+4	17		3–2	—	1–1	5–3
9	Gozo (R)	6	1	2	3	8	10	−2	12	Relegation to the 2000–01 Maltese First Division	1–3	0–0	—	3–1
10	Żurrieq (R)	6	1	0	5	12	22	−10	9	Relegation to the 2000–01 Maltese First Division	0–2	2–3	4–3	—

Source: RSSSF
(R) Relegated

== Season statistics ==
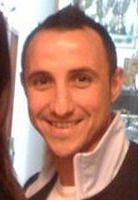
Sliema Wanderers' Michael Mifsud finished as the league top scorer with 21 goals.

=== Top scorers ===
Rank	Player	Club	Goals
1	(Malta) Michael Mifsud	Sliema Wanderers	21
2	(Malta) Gilbert Agius	Valletta	17
2	(Malta) Stefan Giglio	Valletta	17
4	(Bulgaria) Nikolai Kirilov	Żurrieq	15
4	(Federal Republic of Yugoslavia) Nenad Veselji	Valletta	15
6	(Malta) Michael Galea	Birkirkara	14
6	(Democratic Republic of the Congo) Rufin Oba	Floriana	14
6	(Nigeria) Orosco Anonam	Naxxar Lions	14
9	(Malta) Malcolm Licari	Pietà Hotspurs	12
10	(Albania) Edmond Lufi	Pietà Hotspurs	11
