= 2004–05 Maltese Premier League =

Annual soccer tournament

Maltese Premier League
- Season: 2004–05
- Dates: 7 September 2004 – 8 May 2005
- Champions: Sliema Wanderers (26th title)
- Relegated: St. Patrick; Lija Athletic
- Champions League: Sliema Wanderers
- UEFA Cup: Birkirkara; Hibernians
- UEFA Intertoto Cup: Valletta
- Matches played: 132
- Goals scored: 413 (3.13 per match)
- Top goalscorer: Andrew Cohen (21 goals)

The 2003–04 Maltese Premier League was the 25th season of the Maltese Premier League, and the 90th season of top-tier football in Malta. The league started on 7 September 2004 and finished on 8 May 2005. Sliema Wanderers successfully defended last season's league triumph, surpassing Floriana's league title record of 25 championships.

== Teams ==
Locations of the 2004–05 Maltese Premier League teams

The following teams were promoted from the First Division at the start of the season:

- Żabbar St. Patrick
- Lija Athletic

From the previous Premier League season, the following teams were relegated to the First Division:

- Balzan
- Ħamrun Spartans

== First phase ==
=== League table ===
Pos	Team	Pld	W	D	L	GF	GA	GD	Pts	Qualification
1	Sliema Wanderers	18	13	3	2	33	15	+18	42	Qualification for the Top Six
2	Valletta	18	11	3	4	42	26	+16	36	Qualification for the Top Six
3	Hibernians	18	10	6	2	34	22	+12	36	Qualification for the Top Six
4	Birkirkara	18	9	5	4	44	25	+19	32	Qualification for the Top Six
5	Marsaxlokk	18	7	5	6	32	23	+9	26	Qualification for the Top Six
6	Floriana	18	6	6	6	21	22	−1	24	Qualification for the Top Six
7	Pietà Hotspurs	18	5	4	9	34	33	+1	19	Qualification for the Play-out
8	Msida Saint-Joseph (Note: Msida Saint-Joseph has 2 points deducted.)	18	4	6	8	27	34	−7	16	Qualification for the Play-out
9	Żabbar St. Patrick	18	2	3	13	17	45	−28	9	Qualification for the Play-out
10	Lija Athletic	18	2	1	15	10	49	−39	7	Qualification for the Play-out

Source: RSSSF

=== Results ===
Home \ Away	BKR	FRN	HIB	LIJ	MXK	MSD	PTA	SLM	ZAB	VLT
Birkirkara	—	3–0	2–1	4–0	1–1	5–3	2–3	0–2	7–2	1–2
Floriana	1–3	—	1–1	4–0	1–0	1–1	1–1	0–2	2–1	0–0
Hibernians	4–2	2–0	—	2–1	3–3	1–1	2–1	2–3	2–2	2–1
Lija Athletic	1–6	1–1	0–1	—	0–3	1–2	0–4	0–4	1–0	1–2
Marsaxlokk	1–1	0–1	1–2	5–1	—	2–1	4–1	1–3	3–1	1–1
Msida Saint-Joseph	0–2	1–1	0–2	2–1	1–2	—	1–1	1–2	3–1	4–1
Pietà Hotspurs	1–1	2–3	1–3	3–0	0–3	2–2	—	2–3	4–0	2–3
Sliema Wanderers	0–0	1–0	1–1	0–1	2–1	1–1	1–0	—	2–1	3–1
Żabbar St. Patrick	3–3	0–2	0–1	2–0	0–0	3–2	0–5	0–1	—	1–2
Valletta	0–1	3–2	2–2	4–1	3–1	5–1	4–1	3–2	5–0	—

Source: RSSSF
Legend: Blue = home team win; Yellow = draw; Red = away team win.

== Second phase ==
=== Top Six ===
The teams placed in the first six positions in the league table qualified for the Top Six, and the points obtained during the first phase were halved (and rounded up) before the start of second phase. As a result, the teams started with the following points before the second phase: Sliema Wanderers 21 points, Valletta 18, Hibernians 18, Birkirkara 17, Marsaxlokk 15 and Floriana 13.

Pos	Team	Pld	W	D	L	GF	GA	GD	Pts	Qualification	SLM	BKR	HIB	VLT	MXK	FRN
1	Sliema Wanderers (C)	10	5	4	1	14	8	+6	40	Qualification for the 2005–06 UEFA Champions League	—	1–1	1–1	0–0	2–0	2–1
2	Birkirkara	10	6	4	0	25	14	+11	38	Qualification for the 2005–06 UEFA Cup	3–1	—	1–1	6–3	2–2	3–0
3	Hibernians	10	4	5	1	15	10	+5	35	Qualification for the 2005–06 UEFA Cup	1–1	2–2	—	0–3	3–0	1–1
4	Valletta	10	5	1	4	15	15	0	34	Qualification for the 2005 UEFA Intertoto Cup	0–3	1–2	0–2	—	4–1	2–1
5	Marsaxlokk	10	1	1	8	11	25	−14	17		1–2	0–3	1–3	0–1	—	1–0
6	Floriana	10	1	1	8	7	17	−10	16		0–1	0–2	0–1	0–1	4–3	—

Source: RSSSF
(C) Champions

=== Play-out ===
The teams which finished in the last four league positions were placed in the play-out and at the end of the phase the two lowest-placed teams were relegated to the First Division. The points obtained during the first phase were halved (and rounded up) before the start of second phase. As a result, the teams started with the following points before the second phase: Pietà Hotspurs 10 points, Msida Saint-Joseph 8, St. Patrick 5, Lija Athletic 4.

Pos	Team	Pld	W	D	L	GF	GA	GD	Pts	Qualification	PTA	MSD	ZAB	LIJ
7	Pietà Hotspurs	6	3	1	2	10	5	+5	20		—	1–1	4–0	1–0
8	Msida Saint-Joseph	6	3	2	1	11	7	+4	19		2–1	—	3–0	2–0
9	Żabbar St. Patrick (R)	6	3	0	3	10	11	−1	14	Relegation to the 2005–06 Maltese First Division	2–0	4–2	—	4–1
10	Lija Athletic (R)	6	1	1	4	3	11	−8	8	Relegation to the 2005–06 Maltese First Division	0–3	1–1	1–0	—

Source: RSSSF
(R) Relegated

== Season statistics ==
=== Top scorers ===
Rank	Player	Club	Goals
1	(Malta) Andrew Cohen	Hibernians	21
2	(Malta) Ivan Woods	Sliema Wanderers	20
3	(Malta) Michael Galea	Birkirkara	14
4	(Nigeria) Daniel Nwoke	Msida Saint-Joseph	13
5	(Malta) Terence Scerri	Hibernians	12
5	(Malta) Jean Pierre Mifsud Triganza	Birkirkara	12
7	(Nigeria) Haruna Doda	Birkirkara	11
7	(Serbia and Montenegro) Danilo Dončić	Sliema Wanderers	11
7	(Malta) Gilbert Agius	Valletta	11
10	(Malta) Massimo Grima	Valletta	10
10	(Malta) Etienne Barbara	Birkirkara	10
10	(Malta) Cleavon Frendo	Marsaxlokk	10
