= 2000–01 Maltese Premier League =

Maltese Premier League
- Season: 2000–01
- Dates: 19 August 2000 – 30 April 2001
- Champions: Valletta (18th title)
- Relegated: Rabat Ajax; Xgħajra Tornadoes
- Champions League: Valletta
- UEFA Cup: Sliema Wanderers; Birkirkara
- UEFA Intertoto Cup: Hibernians
- Matches played: 132
- Goals scored: 506 (3.83 per match)
- Top goalscorer: Michael Mifsud (30 goals)
- Highest scoring: Xgħajra Tornadoes 0–11 Sliema Wanderers (14 October 2000)

The 2000–01 Maltese Premier League (known as the Rothmans Premier League for sponsorship reasons) was the 21st season of the Maltese Premier League, and the 86th season of top-tier football in Malta. The league started on 19 August 2000 with Birkirkara as the defending champions after their first title in the previous season.

== Teams ==
Locations of the 2000–01 Maltese Premier League teams

The following teams were promoted from the First Division at the start of the season:

- Ħamrun Spartans
- Xgħajra Tornadoes

From the previous Premier League season, the following teams were relegated to the First Division:

- Gozo
- Żurrieq

== First phase ==
=== League table ===
| Pos | Team | Pld | W | D | L | GF | GA | GD | Pts | Qualification |
|---|---|---|---|---|---|---|---|---|---|---|
| 1 | Valletta | 18 | 13 | 3 | 2 | 55 | 27 | +28 | 42 | Qualification for the Top Six |
| 2 | Sliema Wanderers | 18 | 12 | 3 | 3 | 70 | 24 | +46 | 39 | Qualification for the Top Six |
| 3 | Birkirkara | 18 | 11 | 4 | 3 | 34 | 15 | +19 | 37 | Qualification for the Top Six |
| 4 | Hibernians | 18 | 10 | 5 | 3 | 44 | 23 | +21 | 35 | Qualification for the Top Six |
| 5 | Floriana | 18 | 10 | 3 | 5 | 42 | 31 | +11 | 33 | Qualification for the Top Six |
| 6 | Ħamrun Spartans | 18 | 7 | 4 | 7 | 24 | 31 | −7 | 25 | Qualification for the Top Six |
| 7 | Pietà Hotspurs | 18 | 4 | 5 | 9 | 40 | 40 | 0 | 17 | Qualification for the Play-out |
| 8 | Naxxar Lions | 18 | 3 | 3 | 12 | 22 | 44 | −22 | 12 | Qualification for the Play-out |
| 9 | Rabat Ajax | 18 | 2 | 4 | 12 | 23 | 53 | −30 | 10 | Qualification for the Play-out |
| 10 | Xgħajra Tornadoes | 18 | 0 | 2 | 16 | 7 | 73 | −66 | 2 | Qualification for the Play-out |

Source: RSSSF

=== Results ===
| Home \ Away | BKR | FRN | HIB | ĦMR | NXR | PTA | RBT | SLM | VLT | XJR |
|---|---|---|---|---|---|---|---|---|---|---|
| Birkirkara | — | 0–1 | 2–2 | 1–1 | 2–1 | 4–1 | 3–1 | 0–2 | 4–2 | 3–0 |
| Floriana | 2–2 | — | 1–4 | 4–1 | 3–2 | 3–2 | 4–2 | 3–2 | 1–3 | 1–0 |
| Hibernians | 0–2 | 2–2 | — | 2–0 | 3–0 | 2–2 | 1–0 | 2–2 | 3–3 | 6–0 |
| Ħamrun Spartans | 0–1 | 2–1 | 0–3 | — | 3–0 | 2–0 | 1–1 | 2–0 | 0–3 | 2–0 |
| Naxxar Lions | 0–1 | 1–1 | 0–3 | 1–1 | — | 3–1 | 1–3 | 3–3 | 1–3 | 3–2 |
| Pietà Hotspurs | 1–1 | 1–3 | 0–3 | 1–1 | 4–0 | — | 3–1 | 2–3 | 3–5 | 4–0 |
| Rabat Ajax | 0–4 | 0–7 | 2–3 | 2–3 | 2–0 | 2–2 | — | 1–3 | 1–3 | 3–3 |
| Sliema Wanderers | 0–3 | 3–2 | 5–0 | 6–1 | 7–0 | 4–2 | 6–0 | — | 4–1 | 7–0 |
| Valletta | 1–0 | 4–0 | 2–1 | 5–1 | 2–1 | 3–3 | 5–1 | 2–2 | — | 2–0 |
| Xgħajra Tornadoes | 0–1 | 0–3 | 0–4 | 0–3 | 0–5 | 0–8 | 1–1 | 0–11 | 1–6 | — |

Source: RSSSF
Legend: Blue = home team win; Yellow = draw; Red = away team win.

== Second phase ==
=== Top Six ===
The teams placed in the first six positions in the league table qualified for the Top Six, and the points obtained during the first phase were halved (and rounded up) before the start of second phase. As a result, the teams started with the following points before the second phase: Valletta 21 points, Sliema Wanderers 20, Birkirkara 19, Hibernians 18, Floriana 17 and Ħamrun Spartans 13.

| Pos | Team | Pld | W | D | L | GF | GA | GD | Pts | Qualification | VLT | SLM | BKR | HIB | FRN | ĦMR |
|---|---|---|---|---|---|---|---|---|---|---|---|---|---|---|---|---|
| 1 | Valletta (C) | 10 | 8 | 1 | 1 | 21 | 11 | +10 | 46 | Qualification for the 2001–02 UEFA Champions League | — | 2–0 | 2–1 | 1–3 | 2–1 | 2–0 |
| 2 | Sliema Wanderers | 10 | 6 | 2 | 2 | 26 | 13 | +13 | 40 | Qualification for the 2001–02 UEFA Cup | 2–2 | — | 1–2 | 4–2 | 4–1 | 5–1 |
| 3 | Birkirkara | 10 | 5 | 2 | 3 | 16 | 12 | +4 | 36 | Qualification for the 2001–02 UEFA Cup | 1–2 | 1–2 | — | 1–1 | 2–1 | 3–1 |
| 4 | Hibernians | 10 | 4 | 2 | 4 | 16 | 17 | −1 | 32 | Qualification for the 2001 UEFA Intertoto Cup | 2–3 | 1–3 | 2–2 | — | 1–0 | 2–0 |
| 5 | Floriana | 10 | 3 | 1 | 6 | 12 | 17 | −5 | 27 | | 1–4 | 1–1 | 0–2 | 2–0 | — | 3–1 |
| 6 | Ħamrun Spartans | 10 | 0 | 0 | 10 | 4 | 25 | −21 | 12 | | 0–1 | 0–4 | 0–1 | 1–2 | 0–2 | — |

Source: RSSSF
(C) Champions

=== Play-out ===
The teams which finished in the last four league positions were placed in the play-out and at the end of the phase the two lowest-placed teams were relegated to the First Division. The points obtained during the first phase were halved (and rounded up) before the start of second phase. As a result, the teams started with the following points before the second phase: Pietà Hotspurs 9 points, Naxxar Lions 6, Rabat Ajax 5, Xgħajra Tornadoes 1.

| Pos | Team | Pld | W | D | L | GF | GA | GD | Pts | Relegation | PTA | NXR | RBT | XJR |
|---|---|---|---|---|---|---|---|---|---|---|---|---|---|---|
| 7 | Pietà Hotspurs | 6 | 3 | 2 | 1 | 16 | 9 | +7 | 20 | | — | 2–1 | 1–1 | 5–0 |
| 8 | Naxxar Lions | 6 | 3 | 2 | 1 | 18 | 11 | +7 | 17 | | 2–2 | — | 3–3 | 4–3 |
| 9 | Rabat Ajax (R) | 6 | 3 | 2 | 1 | 12 | 10 | +2 | 16 | Relegation to the 2001–02 Maltese First Division | 4–2 | 1–4 | — | 1–0 |
| 10 | Xgħajra Tornadoes (R) | 6 | 0 | 0 | 6 | 4 | 20 | −16 | 1 | Relegation to the 2001–02 Maltese First Division | 1–4 | 0–4 | 0–2 | — |

Source: RSSSF
(R) Relegated

== Season statistics ==
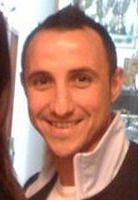
Sliema Wanderers' Michael Mifsud finished as the league top scorer with 30 goals, including four hat-tricks, the most by a single player in the league.

=== Top scorers ===
| Rank | Player | Club | Goals |
|---|---|---|---|
| 1 | (Malta) Michael Mifsud | Sliema Wanderers | 30 |
| 2 | (Malta) Adrian Mifsud | Hibernians | 23 |
| 3 | (Nigeria) Chris Oretan | Valletta | 22 |
| 3 | (Nigeria) Orosco Anonam | Sliema Wanderers | 22 |
| 5 | (Malta) Michael Galea | Birkirkara | 21 |
| 6 | (Malta) Malcolm Licari | Pietà Hotspurs | 19 |
| 7 | (Malta) Gilbert Agius | Valletta | 15 |
| 8 | (Republic of the Congo) Rufin Oba | Floriana | 12 |
| 9 | (Brazil) Eduardo do Nascimento | Floriana | 11 |
| 9 | (Malta) Massimo Grima | Sliema Wanderers | 11 |
| 9 | (Malta) Ivan Woods | Pietà Hotspurs | 11 |

=== Hat-tricks ===
| Player | For | Against | Result | Date |
|---|---|---|---|---|
| (Malta) Paul Zammit | Ħamrun Spartans | Xgħajra Tornadoes | 3–0 | 5 September 2000 |
| (Malta) Michael Mifsud | Sliema Wanderers | Rabat Ajax | 6–0 | 9 September 2000 |
| (Malta) Michael Mifsud^{6} | Sliema Wanderers | Xgħajra Tornadoes | 11–0 | 14 October 2000 |
| (Nigeria) Orosco Anonam | Sliema Wanderers | Xgħajra Tornadoes | 11–0 | 14 October 2000 |
| (Nigeria) Ndubisi Chukunyere | Hibernians | Floriana | 4–1 | 16 October 2000 |
| (Malta) Stefan Sultana^{4} | Hibernians | Xgħajra Tornadoes | 6–0 | 21 October 2000 |
| (Republic of the Congo) Rufin Oba | Floriana | Rabat Ajax | 7–0 | 19 November 2000 |
| (Malta) Michael Mifsud | Sliema Wanderers | Ħamrun Spartans | 6–1 | 10 December 2000 |
| (Malta) Malcolm Licari | Pietà Hotspurs | Naxxar Lions | 4–0 | 1 December 2000 |
| (Malta) Michael Mifsud | Sliema Wanderers | Naxxar Lions | 7–0 | 28 January 2001 |
