= 2005–06 Maltese Premier League =

Maltese Premier League
- Season: 2005–06
- Dates: 5 August 2005 – 14 May 2006
- Champions: Birkirkara (2nd title)
- Relegated: Mosta; Ħamrun Spartans
- Champions League: Birkirkara
- UEFA Cup: Sliema Wanderers; Hibernians
- UEFA Intertoto Cup: Marsaxlokk
- Matches played: 132
- Goals scored: 440 (3.33 per match)
- Top goalscorer: Michael Galea (19 goals)

The 2005–06 Maltese Premier League (known as the BOV Premier League for sponsorship reasons) was the 26th season of the Maltese Premier League, and the 91st season of top-level league football in Malta. Birkirkara won the title while Mosta and Ħamrun Spartans were relegated to the Maltese First Division.

== Teams ==
Locations of the 2005–06 Maltese Premier League teams

The following teams were promoted from the First Division at the start of the season:

- Mosta
- Ħamrun Spartans

From the previous Premier League season, the following teams were relegated to the First Division:

- Żabbar St. Patrick
- Lija Athletic

== First phase ==
=== League table ===
Pos	Team	Pld	W	D	L	GF	GA	GD	Pts	Qualification
1	Birkirkara	18	13	2	3	48	21	+27	41	Qualification for the Top Six
2	Sliema Wanderers	18	12	3	3	37	12	+25	39	Qualification for the Top Six
3	Hibernians	18	12	1	5	37	19	+18	37	Qualification for the Top Six
4	Marsaxlokk	18	10	4	4	36	23	+13	34	Qualification for the Top Six
5	Valletta	18	7	2	9	22	31	−9	23	Qualification for the Top Six
6	Msida Saint-Joseph	18	6	3	9	28	33	−5	21	Qualification for the Top Six
7	Floriana	18	4	7	7	24	28	−4	19	Qualification for the Play-out
8	Ħamrun Spartans	18	6	1	11	29	41	−12	19	Qualification for the Play-out
9	Pietà Hotspurs	18	4	3	11	22	39	−17	15	Qualification for the Play-out
10	Mosta	18	2	2	14	20	56	−36	8	Qualification for the Play-out

Source: RSSSF

=== Results ===
Home \ Away	BKR	FRN	HIB	ĦMR	MXK	MST	MSD	PTA	SLM	VLT
Birkirkara	—	1–1	2–0	2–1	1–1	6–0	4–1	4–1	2–1	4–2
Floriana	0–1	—	0–3	1–3	1–2	4–4	0–0	0–2	0–0	2–1
Hibernians	5–2	1–1	—	1–0	0–1	3–2	4–2	2–1	0–3	1–2
Ħamrun Spartans	0–6	2–4	0–2	—	1–2	2–1	0–2	2–4	1–1	4–2
Marsaxlokk	2–0	1–1	1–4	4–3	—	5–1	1–0	1–3	1–2	2–3
Mosta	2–3	0–3	0–3	0–3	1–3	—	2–1	3–1	0–6	0–3
Msida Saint-Joseph	2–5	4–2	0–2	2–1	1–1	4–1	—	4–2	1–4	0–1
Pietà Hotspurs	0–2	1–3	0–4	2–3	1–4	3–3	0–0	—	0–3	0–0
Sliema Wanderers	2–1	1–0	0–2	4–1	0–0	2–0	2–1	0–1	—	3–0
Valletta	0–2	1–1	2–0	1–2	0–4	1–0	1–3	1–0	1–3	—

Source: RSSSF
Legend: Blue = home team win; Yellow = draw; Red = away team win.

== Second phase ==
=== Top Six ===
The teams placed in the first six positions in the league table qualified for the Top Six, and the points obtained during the first phase were halved (and rounded up) before the start of second phase. As a result, the teams started with the following points before the second phase: Birkirkara 21 points, Sliema Wanderers 20, Hibernians 19, Marsaxlokk 17, Valletta 12 and Msida Saint-Joseph 11.

Pos	Team	Pld	W	D	L	GF	GA	GD	Pts	Qualification	BKR	SLM	MXK	HIB	VLT	MSD
1	Birkirkara (C)	10	6	3	1	20	6	+14	42	Qualification for the 2006–07 UEFA Champions League	—	1–1	1–0	1–0	3–0	5–0
2	Sliema Wanderers	10	5	2	3	21	15	+6	37	Qualification for the 2006–07 UEFA Cup	2–1	—	4–1	3–4	2–1	0–1
3	Marsaxlokk	10	6	1	3	16	13	+3	36	Qualification for the 2006 UEFA Intertoto Cup	1–1	2–1	—	1–0	3–4	1–0
4	Hibernians	10	2	3	5	12	18	−6	28	Qualification for the 2006–07 UEFA Cup (Note: Hibernians won the 2005–06 Maltese FA Trophy and thereby qualified for the 2006–07 UEFA Cup.)	1–3	0–3	3–1	—	1–3	0–0
5	Valletta	10	3	3	4	15	18	−3	24		0–0	1–2	2–2	2–2	—	0–2
6	Msida Saint-Joseph	10	0	4	6	12	26	−14	15		1–4	3–3	3–4	1–1	1–2	—

Source: RSSSF
(C) Champions

=== Play-out ===
The teams which finished in the last four league positions were placed in the play-out and at the end of the phase the two lowest-placed teams were relegated to the First Division. The points obtained during the first phase were halved (and rounded up) before the start of second phase. As a result, the teams started with the following points before the second phase: Floriana 10 points, Ħamrun Spartans 10, Pietà Hotspurs 8, Mosta 4.

Pos	Team	Pld	W	D	L	GF	GA	GD	Pts	Relegation	FRN	PTA	MST	ĦMR
7	Floriana	6	2	2	2	12	9	+3	18		—	1–1	0–1	3–0
8	Pietà Hotspurs	6	2	3	1	9	8	+1	17		2–1	—	2–2	1–1
9	Mosta (R)	6	3	3	0	14	9	+5	16	Relegation to the 2006–07 Maltese First Division	3–3	3–1	—	5–3
10	Ħamrun Spartans (R)	6	0	2	4	6	15	−9	12	Relegation to the 2006–07 Maltese First Division	2–4	0–2	0–0	—

Source: RSSSF
(R) Relegated

== Season statistics ==
=== Top scorers ===
Rank	Player	Club	Goals
1	(Malta) Michael Galea	Birkirkara	19
2	(Nigeria) Daniel Nwoke	Msida Saint-Joseph	16
2	(Malta) Ivan Woods	Sliema Wanderers	16
4	(Malta) Adrian Mifsud	Floriana	15
5	(Malta) Etienne Barbara	Birkirkara	14
5	(Malta) Andrew Cohen	Hibernians	14
5	(Brazil) Wendell Gomes	Marsaxlokk	14
8	(Serbia and Montenegro) Danilo Dončić	Sliema Wanderers	13
9	(Nigeria) Ikechukwu Chibueze	Mosta	12
9	(Malta) Cleavon Frendo	Marsaxlokk	12
