= Marsaxlokk F.C. =

Association football club in Malta

Marsaxlokk
- Full name: Marsaxlokk Football Club
- Nicknames: The Southseasiders; The Blues; Xlukkajri
- Founded: 1949; 77 years ago as Marsaxlokk White Stars
- Ground: Marsaxlokk Ground; Marsaxlokk
- Capacity: 1,000
- Coordinates: 35°50′11.2″N 14°32′36.4″E
- President: Frank Cachia
- Head coach: Enzo Potenza
- League: Maltese Premier League
- 2025–26: Maltese Premier League, 3rd of 12
Home colours	Away colours	Third colours

Marsaxlokk Football Club is a Maltese professional football club from the town of Marsaxlokk, which currently plays in the BOV Premier League. The club was founded in 1949. Marsaxlokk won the Maltese Premier League title for the first time in their history, when they became league champions for the 2006–07 season. Marsaxlokk has its headquarters at Triq il-Kavalleriza, Mxlokk redoubt.

== History ==
=== Early years (1949–1954) ===
The first team from Marsaxlokk represented in MFA competitions were Beland City back in 1944. Although the team was formed within the Zejtun, they decided to represent Marsaxlokk after the MFA adopted the scheme of representation of the district.

After World War II, a number of teams could be formed and in 1949 eventually team Marsaxlokk FC was formed. Marsaxlokk White Stars took part in the Amateur Cup and in 1955 they applied to take part in competitions organized by the MFA.

The association held a series of play-offs to fill the gap that was left team Naxxar Lions in the Third Division. Nevertheless, after two years, the team decided to withdraw from the competitions MFA.

In 1965, Marsaxlokk FC again applied to participate in the competitions of the MFA. The application was accepted. In season between 1965 and 1966, they took part in the league of the Third Division, finished in third place and reached the final of the Knock Out. The season after, Marsaxlokk FC finished runner-up in both the league and in the Knock Out thereby gained promotion for the first time. But season after (1970–71) they were again relegated. The promotion to the second division again achieved the following season (1973–74). After an excellent season in the league, where they maintained a record without defeat, they lost against in Siggiewi Championship decider. They remained in the Second Division until the 1977–78 season when they were relegated.

After eight years in the Third Division, Marsaxlokk won Section B in 1985–86 to then be promoted to the Second Division. The season after, they failed to be promoted so fell again in the Third Division. However, in the 1991–92 season, they won the Third Division Section A with only one loss in Championship decider on penalties against Zejtun Corinthians.

Then, back in the Second Division, Marsaxlokk have set themselves until finally won the Second Division in 1999–2000, to eventually be promoted to First Division. In 2002–2003 season, Marsaxlokk were promoted for the first time in the Premier League having been crowned champions of the First Division Rothmans.

Then after two years in the Maltese Premier League, for the first time, Marsaxlokk wrote in their history the final of the FA Trophy. Although lost against champions Sliema Wanderers c, are qualified for the first round of UEFA Cup qualification where finally have met with NK Primorje of Slovenia.

=== Entering the League (1955–1957) ===
The club applied for a place in the Malta Football Association competitions in 1955. The Malta Football Association organised a series of play-offs to fill a vacancy left by Naxxar Lions in the Maltese Third Division.

Marsaxlokk went on to win the play-offs and secure a place in the Maltese Third Division, but following a lack of interest in the club, they opted out of Malta Football Association after just two years.

=== Re-entering the League (1965–1978) ===
In 1965, Marsaxlokk again applied to take part in the Malta Football Association competitions and their application was accepted. Marsaxlokk took part in the Maltese Third Division 1965/66, finishing in third place and reaching the final of the Knock-Out. The following season, the Southseasiders finished as runners-up in both the Maltese Third Division and again reached the knock-out.

They managed to win promotion to the Maltese Second Division for the first time in their history during the 1970/71 season, but were relegated the following season. The club again achieved promotion to Maltese Second Division in 1973/74, following an excellent league campaign where they held an unbeaten record, and only lost to Siggiewi in the championship decider.

Marsaxlokk retained their Maltese Second Division status until for five seasons, until 1977/78 when they returned to the Maltese Third Division following yet another relegation.

=== Between the Maltese Third Division and the Maltese Second Division (1978–1992) ===
The club remained in the Maltese Third Division for eight years, before winning Section B in 1985/86 and as a result gained promotion back to Maltese Second Division. The promotion didn't last long and the club were relegated back to the Maltese Third Division the following season.

Some six seasons later Marsaxlokk found themselves back in the Maltese Second Division after winning the Maltese Third Division Section A, and only failed to clinch the championship decider to the Zejtun Corinthians on penalties.

=== Promotion to the Maltese First Division (1992–2000) ===
Marsaxlokk established themselves as a Maltese Second Division side for nearly a decade, until they finally won the Maltese Second Division for the first time in the history in 1999–2000, and won promotion to the Maltese First Division.

=== Promotion to the Maltese Premier League (2000–02) ===
With the club seemingly doing well, they spent just two seasons in the Maltese First Division.

Marsaxlokk won the Maltese First Division during the 2001–02 season, and were promoted as champions to the Maltese Premier League, where the club would appear for the first time in their history.

=== Entering Europe (2003–05) ===
After two years in the Maltese Premier League, the Southseasiders managed to reach the final of the Maltese Cup in 2004; this was the first time the club had ever reached the final, and despite the club losing to the champions, the Sliema Wanderers.

Despite the fact that Marsaxlokk had lost in the final of the Maltese Cup, they qualified for the first qualifying round of the UEFA Cup where they met NK Primorje of Slovenia, losing 1–0 at home in the first leg and 2–0 in Slovenia in the return leg.

It was reported on 6 January 2003 that the ambitious Maltese club had made an attempt to sign former England player Paul Gascoigne, but the club failed in any attempt, despite a reported salary of £12,500 a month, which would have been a record salary in Malta had Gascoigne agreed to the terms.

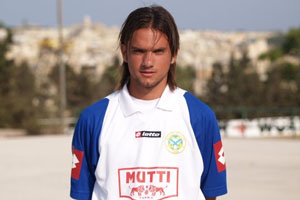
André Schembri joined the club from Hibernians.

During the January transfer window of 2003/04, the club strengthened the squad further, with the signings of highly rated young Maltese midfield duo André Schembri from Hibernians and Cleavon Frendo from Pietà Hotspurs.

Marsaxlokk were showing real promise by this stage and were looking ready to challenge the likes of the Sliema Wanderers, Valletta and Birkirkara to major honours, and yet again signalled they were a side improving. However, the side finished in fifth place for the 2004–05 season, a place lower than their highest-ever league finish of fourth the season prior.

=== (2005–06) season ===
In the 2005–06 season, Marsaxlokk signed: Brazil-born striker Wendell Gomes and Portuguese ex-Boavista defender Nuno Gomes joined the club, along with Malta internationals, defender Carlo Mamo from the Sliema Wanderers and Jamie Pace from Valletta.

The club also pulled off the biggest transfer in their history on 6 August 2005, when they acquired the services of former English Premier League and former Sheffield Wednesday and Nottingham Forest player Chris Bart-Williams.

Despite all the hype surrounding Bart-Williams' move to Malta, he did not live up to the billing and the signing resulted in one of the biggest flops the club had ever experienced. Bart-Williams was soon on his way back home only managing eight appearances before having his three-year contract cancelled after only two months of signing it.

The club enjoyed a successful season and finished in the highest league position in their history, when they grabbed a third-place finish in the Maltese Premier League. The club also managed to qualify for the first round of the UEFA Intertoto Cup where they would meet the Bosnia and Herzegovina side HŠK Zrinjski Mostar; sadly for Marsaxlokk their European adventure didn't last for long as they were knocked out 4–1 over the two legs.

=== Winning the Maltese Premier League (2006–07) season ===
The following season Marsaxlokk acquired the services of Maltese internationals, goalkeeper Justin Haber, defender Luke Dimech, midfielder Peter Pullicino and striker Daniel Bogdanovic along with Nigerian midfielder Haruna Doda.

With the club finishing in third position the previous season, and with the list of impressive signings that had been made by manager Brian Talbot, the Marsaxlokk fans had every reason to be in an optimistic mood. With the club doing well in the league the January transfer window arrived. The club swapped André Rocha da Silva for Udo Nwoko with Hibernians, both on loan deals until the end of the season. Shaun Bajada also left the club on loan until the end of the season, joining Msida Saint-Joseph. The team again impressed during the league season, and were confirmed as champions with one game remaining. They even achieved a 4–1 defeat of the second-placed Sliema Wanderers on the penultimate day of the season with Cleavon Frendo, Jamie Pace, André Schembri and Daniel Bogdanovic all finding the net on the day.

Another award went back to Marsaxlokk when Bogdanovic finished as the league's top goalscorer with 31 goals in 28 appearances, and ended the season one goal short of Danilo Doncic's Maltese record of 32 goals in a season, set while playing for Valletta during the 2001–02 season.

=== 2007–08 season ===
Marsaxlokk started the 2007–08 season with more worries than the previous and many believe that Marsaxlokk will struggle to emulate the success of the 2006–07 season with the loss of some vital players such as Luke Dimech, Justin Haber, Daniel Bogdanovic all leaving, and André Schembri going on a season-long loan to German club Eintracht Braunschweig. The club also decided against renewing the contracts of duo Samir Garci and Haruna Doda. The club did however sign Englishman Daniel Webb following his release from Yeovil Town.

Following the team's triumph the previous season they were entered into the UEFA Champions League qualifying stages. Following so many player departures the club struggled to list a full 16 players in their debut match against FK Sarajevo, where the club only managed to list 13 players, and due to the club's lack of resources they lost the tie 9–1 on (agg).

Daniel Webb lasted just one game with the club, and returned to his native England to team up with AFC Wimbledon. The team have so far signed Maltese international William Camenzuli, along with the Brazilian trio of Renato Conceição, André Rocha da Silva and the re-signing of Wendell Gomes. The team also snapped up Mark Barbara on a season-long loan from Valletta.

The transfer window re-opened on 1 January 2008 with the club in seventh place after 12 games, taking a pretty bad beating from the newly promoted Ħamrun Spartans on 7 December 2007, where they were beaten 7–3. On the transfer front the club released the Brazilian duo of Wendell Gomes and André Rocha da Silva by mutual consent (with the latter joining the Sliema Wanderers); this meant that two of the three foreigners at the club had now left, paving the way for two new foreigners to join the club during the January transfer period.

Marsaxlokk made their first signing of the January transfer window, when they acquired the services of Argentine striker Julio Alcorsé on loan from fellow Premier League side Hibernians. Marsaxlokk followed up the signing of Julio Alcorsé on 23 January, with Montenegro born striker Aleksandar Madžar, who joined on a free following his release from Sliema Wanderers.

Things took a turn for the better with the aforementioned changes within the striking department and it was the names of Julio Alcorsé and Aleksandar Madžar that would appear on the scoresheet regularly. Following the players' good form in front of the goal, Julio Alcorsé finished the season third in the top goalscoring charts with 12 goals and Aleksandar Madžar finished seventh with 10 goals to his name.Marsaxlokk finally managed to clinch a second-place finish in the table, and grabbed a place in next season's UEFA Cup first qualifying round, a rather impressive achievement given the number of departures the team had to overcome in the season. The team rounded off the season with a fantastic 4–0 victory over newly crowned champions Valletta, with goals for the day coming from Jamie Pace, Stephen Wellman (x2) and Aleksandar Madžar.

=== 2008–09 season ===
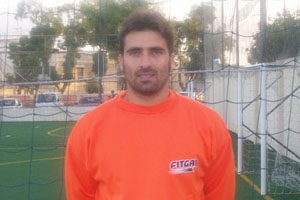
Goalkeeper Saviour Darmanin joined from Valletta.

Following the club's second-place finish during the 2007/08 season, they were seeded for the first qualifying round of the UEFA Cup. The draw was made on 1 July 2008, in which Marsaxlokk were drawn against Croatian outfit Slaven Belupo, who also finished second in their respective league last season.

On the transfer front long serving defender Charlo Magro announced his retirement, after five seasons with the club. André Schembri completed a season long loan at German outfit Eintracht Braunschweig, and will return to Germany for the current season, after joining Carl Zeiss Jena on another season long loan. Also departing are the influential midfield duo of Jamie Pace and Cleavon Frendo, who both signed with league champions Valletta, along with Montenegro striker Aleksandar Madžar who wasn't retained, and later went on to join Floriana. Young midfielder Gordon Mizzi will spend the season on loan with Maltese Third Division side Gzira United, in order to gain some valuable first team experience.

Joining the club was Valletta goalkeeper Saviour Darmanin, Replacing Aleksandar Madžar as the club's third foreign player is Marcelo Pereira, who played the previous season for relegated Mqabba, and finished in second place in the league's goalscoring charts, with an impressive 14 goals. Last season's top goalscorer Julio Alcorsé and fellow striker Mark Barbara had their loan moves from Hibernians and Valletta respectively, extended for a further season.

On 8 July 2008, Marsaxlokk strengthened their squad further with the signings of midfielder Christian Cassar, who joined on a five-year contract from Floriana and defender Clive Brincat from St. George's, although the latter had spent last season on loan with Msida Saint-Joseph. The club also confirmed the signing of Malta vice captain and defender Brian Said from Sliema Wanderers along with fellow defender Arnold Buttigieg from St. Patrick the following day. However, goalkeeper Reuben Gauci and defender Shawn Tellus departed, both players signed season long loan deals with newly promoted side Qormi. On 20 August 2008, Marsaxlokk rounded up their summer of new signings, with the capture of Malta international Claude Mattocks, who had fallen out of favour with Valletta.

Marsaxlokk started the season on 28 August 2008 with an unimpressive draw against newly promoted Qormi, with Julio Alcorsé scoring a very late equaliser to cancel out an earlier goal Ivan to force a 1–1 draw.

Following a 2–0 defeat by holders Valletta, the club recorded their first win coming from two goals behind to beat Ħamrun Spartans 4–2, with goals from Malcolm Licari, Brian Said, Marcelo Pereira and Claude Mattocks.

Following a list of disappointing results, Marsaxlokk appointed Msida Saint-Joseph manager Patrick Curmi as the club's new manager on 18 December 2008, with previous manager Brian Talbot moving upstairs as the club's technical director.

Patrick Curmi's reign began with an unfortunate 1–0 defeat to Valletta, with former Marsaxlokk player Cleavon Frendo scoring the only goal, Curmi did taste his first victory in his fourth game with a 2–1 win over Floriana.

With Marsaxlokk still running the risk of finishing 7th and playing in the relegation pool, their fate would be sealed on the last day of the first phase with a game against Curmi's old club Msida Saint-Joseph. A Marsaxlokk win would mean the clubs would swap places in the league and condemn Msida Saint-Joseph to a place in the relegation pool. Patrick Curmi used his knowledge of his old club to mastermind a 2–1 win and claim the final place in the championship pool.

Marsaxlokk season did however have a sour note after an ongoing investigation into an allegation of bribery against player Claude Mattocks and team manager Peter Hartshorne. On 24 March 2009, both were convicted of bribery and sentenced to four months jail suspended for a year and fined €500. Both parties had pleaded guilty to trying to bribe Msida Saint-Joseph goalkeeper Matthew Camilleri in a fixture on 23 November 2008, the game ended 1–1. Following the verdict Claude Mattocks and Peter Hartshorne were both relieved of their duties with the club. Marsaxlokk concluded their season in impressive style, when despite a 2–1 defeat to Floriana the club managed a fourth-place finish.

=== 2009–10 season ===
The Club still claiming its innocence, pursued its campaign in the First Division with fierce competition and at a heavy financial cost eventually winning the double honors of that season and claimed its Premier place once again. During this time the Club started restructuring its facilities that of a new training ground completed with dressing rooms and other needy facilities.

=== 2016–17 season ===
After being promoted as Champions from the 3rd Division to the 2nd Division, the Club managed to end the season positively by remaining in the 2nd Division. Marsaxlokk FC Youth Team (U19's) were crowned Champions of Section E.

=== 2017–18 season ===
The Club ended the season positively by remaining in the 2nd Division. Marsaxlokk FC Youth Team (U19's) remained in Section D.

=== 2018–19 season ===
The Club ended the season by remaining in the 2nd Division. Marsaxlokk FC Youth Team (U19's) were promoted to Section C.

=== 2019–20 season ===
The club were promoted to the newly named Challenge League (2nd tier of Maltese football). Marsaxlokk FC Youth team missed out on a promotion to Section B after the League ended in March thus staying in Section C.

== Footballer of the year award ==
Year	Player name
2007/08	(Malta) Kevin Sammut

For previous winners, see Maltese Player of the Year.

== Players ==
=== Current squad ===
As of 19 August 2026

Note: Flags indicate national team as defined under FIFA eligibility rules; some limited exceptions apply. Players may hold more than one non-FIFA nationality.

No.	Pos.	Nation	Player
1	GK	MLT	Andrea Cassar
2	DF	UKR	Oleksiy Bykov
3	DF	BRA	Weder Silva
4	DF	TUN	Oualid El Hasni
5	DF	MLT	Enrico Pepe
6	MF	MLT	Nikolai Muscat
7	MF	WAL	Isaac Christie-Davies
8	MF	ARG	Ulises Arias
9	FW	DEN	Rasmus Lindén
10	FW	CPV	Dodo
11	MF	MLT	Juan Carlos Corbalan
14	FW	MLT	Ensell Attard
15	MF	MLT	Neil Galea

No.	Pos.	Nation	Player
16	MF	MLT	Georgios Karamitsios
18	MF	MLT	Grech Torsten
20	MF	MLT	Matthias Mallia
22	GK	CGO	Christoffer Mafoumbi
23	MF	MLT	Tristan Caruana
24	MF	MLT	Lucas Caruana
25	MF	CMR	Joseph Minala
26	DF	MLT	Miguel Maniscalco
27	DF	ARG	Leandro Aguirre
28	FW	ALB	Redon Mihana
30	GK	MLT	Zach Carabott
33	MF	LTU	Domantas Šimkus
56	GK	JPN	Makoto Kikushima

=== Out on loan ===
Note: Flags indicate national team as defined under FIFA eligibility rules; some limited exceptions apply. Players may hold more than one non-FIFA nationality.

No.	Pos.	Nation	Player

== Club officials and coaching staff history ==
=== Club officials ===
- President: Frank Cachia
- Vice president: Joseph Mifsud
- Secretary: Royin Grech
- Treasurer: Jasmine Cassar
- Team manager: Peter Agius

== Managerial history ==
See Marsaxlokk F.C. Managers

Manager	Period
(Malta) Tarcisio Azzopardi	1994–1995
(Malta) Jimmy Briffa	1995–1996
(Malta) Charles Cassar	1996–1997
(Malta) John B Darmanin	1997
(Malta) Louis Cutajar	1997–2000
(Malta) Michael Degiorgio	2000–2001
(Malta) Albert Vella	2001–2002
(Malta) JJ Aquilina	2002–2003
(Malta) Robert Kelly	2003–2004
(Bulgaria) Atanas Marinov	2004–2005
(Malta) Ray Farrugia	2005–2006
(England) Brian Talbot	2006–2008
(Malta) Patrick Curmi	2008–2011
(Malta) Winston Muscat	2011
(Malta) Anton Cremona	2011–2012
(Malta) Louis Cutajar	2012–2013
(Malta) Alfred Attard	2013
(Malta) Charles Borg	2013–2016
(Malta) Joe Desira	2013–2014
(Malta) Andel Mifsud	2014–2015
(Malta) Jeffrey Mifsud	2015–2016
(Argentina) Sergio Soldano	2016–2018
(Malta) Jonathan Holland	2018–2019
(Malta) Edgar Degabriele	2019–2021
(Argentina) Pablo Doffo	2021–2023
(Malta) Winston Muscat	2023–2024
(Italy) Enzo Potenza	2024–

== Seasons ==
This is a list of seasons played by Marsaxlokk Football Club in Maltese football, from 1997 to the present day.

Season	Division	Position	Significant Events	Maltese Cup
1997/98	Maltese First Division	4th
1998/99	Maltese First Division	9th
1999/00	Maltese Second Division	2nd	Runners-Up
2000/01	Maltese First Division	6th
2001/02	Maltese First Division	1st	Champions
2002/03	Maltese Premier League	6th
2003/04	Maltese Premier League	4th		Runners-Up
2004/05	Maltese Premier League	5th
2005/06	Maltese Premier League	3rd
2006/07	Maltese Premier League	1st	Champions
2007/08	Maltese Premier League	2nd	Runners-Up
2008/09	Maltese Premier League	4th	Relegated
2009/10	Maltese First Division	1st	Champions
2010/11	Maltese Premier League

== Achievements ==
Maltese Premier League Champions:
2006–07

Maltese Cup Runners-up:
2003–04, 2022–23

Maltese First Division Champions:
2001–02, 2009–10

Maltese First Division Knock-Out Winners:
2009–10

Maltese Second Division Champions:
1999–00

Maltese Third Division Champions:
1970–71, 2015–2016

Maltese Third Division Runners-up:
1973–74, 1985–86, 1991–92

Maltese Third Division Section Winners:
1962–63, 1967–68, 1993–94

Maltese Third Division Knock-Out Winners:
1972–73

== European record ==
Season	Competition	Round	Country	Club	Score
2004–05	UEFA Cup	1Q	(Slovenia)	Primorje	0–1, 0–2 (0–3 agg)
2006	UEFA Intertoto Cup	1R	(Bosnia and Herzegovina)	Zrinjski Mostar	1–1, 0–3 (1–4 agg)
2007–08	UEFA Champions League	1Q	(Bosnia and Herzegovina)	Sarajevo	0–6, 1–3 (1–9 agg)
2008–09	UEFA Cup	1Q	(Croatia)	Slaven Belupo	0–4, 0–4 (0–8 agg)
2024–25	UEFA Conference League	1Q	(Albania)	Partizani	1–1, 1−2 (2−3 agg)
2026–27	UEFA Conference League	1Q	(Armenia)	Pyunik	0-1, 0-3 (0-4 agg)
