= 2001–02 Maltese Premier League =

Maltese Premier League
- Season: 2001–02
- Dates: 18 August 2001 – 5 May 2002
- Champions: Hibernians (9th title)
- Relegated: Naxxar Lions; Lija Athletic
- Champions League: Hibernians
- UEFA Cup: Sliema Wanderers; Birkirkara
- UEFA Intertoto Cup: Valletta
- Matches: 133
- Goals: 440 (3.31 per match)
- Top goalscorer: Danilo Dončić (32 goals)

The 2001–02 Maltese Premier League (known as the Rothmans Premier League for sponsorship reasons) was the 22nd season of the Maltese Premier League, and the 87th season of top-tier football in Malta. The league started on 18 August 2001 and finished on 5 May 2002. Valletta were the defending champions.

== Teams ==
Locations of the 2001–02 Maltese Premier League teams

The following teams were promoted from the First Division at the start of the season:

- Marsa
- Lija Athletic

From the previous Premier League season, the following teams were relegated to the First Division:

- Rabat Ajax
- Xgħajra Tornadoes

== First phase ==
=== League table ===
Pos	Team	Pld	W	D	L	GF	GA	GD	Pts	Qualification
1	Birkirkara	18	12	4	2	46	16	+30	40	Qualification for the Top Six
2	Hibernians	18	12	4	2	41	22	+19	40	Qualification for the Top Six
3	Sliema Wanderers	18	12	2	4	48	16	+32	38	Qualification for the Top Six
4	Valletta	18	10	5	3	40	21	+19	35	Qualification for the Top Six
5	Ħamrun Spartans	18	7	2	9	23	33	−10	23	Qualification for the Top Six
6	Floriana	18	6	4	8	27	24	+3	22 (Note: Floriana won the sixth-place play-off against Marsa, played on 26 February 2002, 4–3 via a penalty shoot-out after the game had finished 0–0 after extra time.)	Qualification for the Top Six
7	Marsa	18	6	4	8	32	38	−6	22	Qualification for the Play-out
8	Pietà Hotspurs	18	4	3	11	20	36	−16	15	Qualification for the Play-out
9	Naxxar Lions	18	4	0	14	24	54	−30	12	Qualification for the Play-out
10	Lija Athletic	18	2	2	14	14	55	−41	8	Qualification for the Play-out

Source: RSSSSF

=== Results ===
Home \ Away	BKR	FRN	HIB	ĦMR	LJA	MRS	NXR	PTA	SLM	VLT
Birkirkara	—	3–1	1–1	5–0	3–0	3–0	5–1	5–2	0–1	1–3
Floriana	0–1	—	1–2	0–0	3–1	2–2	2–1	5–1	2–0	1–2
Hibernians	0–1	2–1	—	1–1	5–0	3–2	3–2	4–1	2–1	5–4
Ħamrun Spartans	1–2	1–0	0–1	—	2–0	2–3	2–1	2–1	1–5	0–3
Lija Athletic	1–4	2–2	0–4	1–2	—	1–2	3–2	2–1	0–0	0–2
Marsa	2–4	1–1	2–2	2–0 (Note: Marsa were awarded a 2–0 win after a protest. Originally, Ħamrun Spartans won the first encounter with a 1–0 score.)	5–1	—	2–1	2–3	2–4	1–0
Naxxar Lions	1–6	0–3	1–3	2–4	4–2	2–0	—	2–0	1–4	1–4
Pietà Hotspurs	1–1	3–1	0–1	0–3	3–0	2–0	0–1	—	0–3	1–1
Sliema Wanderers	1–1	0–1	2–0	3–2	7–0	4–1	6–0	3–1	—	1–2
Valletta	0–0	2–1	2–2	3–0	4–0	3–3	5–1	0–0	0–3	—

Source: RSSSF
Legend: Blue = home team win; Yellow = draw; Red = away team win.

== Second phase ==
=== Top Six ===
The teams placed in the first six positions in the league table qualified for the Top Six, and the points obtained during the first phase were halved (and rounded up) before the start of second phase. As a result, the teams started with the following points before the second phase: Birkirkara 20 points, Hibernians 20, Sliema Wanderers 19, Valletta 18, Ħamrun Spartans 12 and Floriana 11.

Pos	Team	Pld	W	D	L	GF	GA	GD	Pts	Qualification	HIB	SLM	BKR	VLT	FRN	ĦMR
1	Hibernians (C)	10	7	2	1	26	12	+14	43	Qualification for the 2002–03 UEFA Champions League	—	4–2	2–2	2–4	3–1	2–0
2	Sliema Wanderers	10	5	2	3	19	14	+5	36	Qualification for the 2002–03 UEFA Cup	1–3	—	2–2	2–1	3–2	4–0
3	Birkirkara	10	2	5	3	14	13	+1	31	Qualification for the 2002–03 UEFA Cup	1–3	0–0	—	1–1	1–2	4–0
4	Valletta	10	3	3	4	12	12	0	30	Qualification for the 2002 UEFA Intertoto Cup	1–1	2–0	1–2	—	0–2	1–0
5	Floriana	10	4	2	4	12	14	−2	25		0–2	0–3	1–1	1–0	—	1–1
6	Ħamrun Spartans	10	1	2	7	3	21	−18	17		0–2	0–2	1–0	1–1	0–2	—

Source: RSSSF
(C) Champions

=== Play-out ===
The teams which finished in the last four league positions were placed in the play-out and at the end of the phase the two lowest-placed teams were relegated to the First Division. The points obtained during the first phase were halved (and rounded up) before the start of second phase. As a result, the teams started with the following points before the second phase: Marsa 11 points, Pietà Hotspurs 8, Naxxar Lions 6, Lija Athletic 4.

Pos	Team	Pld	W	D	L	GF	GA	GD	Pts	Relegation	PTA	MRS	NXR	LJA
7	Pietà Hotspurs	6	4	0	2	9	6	+3	20		—	2–1	2–1	2–0
8	Marsa	6	2	1	3	10	10	0	18		1–2	—	2–1	4–0
9	Naxxar Lions (R)	6	2	2	2	13	8	+5	14	Relegation to the 2002–03 Maltese First Division	2–1	1–1	—	6–0
10	Lija Athletic (R)	6	2	1	3	7	15	−8	11	Relegation to the 2002–03 Maltese First Division	1–0	4–1	2–2	—

Source: RSSSF
(R) Relegated

== Season statistics ==
=== Top scorers ===
Rank	Player	Club	Goals
1	(Serbia and Montenegro) Danilo Dončić	Sliema Wanderers	32
2	(Malta) Adrian Mifsud	Hibernians	27
3	(Nigeria) Chris Oretan	Valletta	15
3	(Malta) Michael Galea	Birkirkara	15
5	(Malta) Malcolm Licari	Pietà Hotspurs	12
6	(Malta) Daniel Bogdanović	Naxxar Lions	12
6	(Malta) Stefan Sultana	Ħamrun Spartans	12
8	(Malta) Matthew Calascione	Birkirkara	10
9	(Malta) Ivan Zammit	Valletta	9
9	(Brazil) Eduardo do Nascimento	Floriana	9
9	(Nigeria) Ndubisi Chukunyere	Hibernians	9

=== Hat-tricks ===
Player	For	Against	Result	Date
(Nigeria) Chimezie Nwoke	Naxxar Lions	Lija Athletic	4–2	19 August 2001
(Malta) Chucks Nwoko	Birkirkara	Pietà Hotspurs	5–2	18 August 2001
(Serbia and Montenegro) Danilo Dončić	Sliema Wanderers	Pietà Hotspurs	3–1	8 September 2001
(Serbia and Montenegro) Danilo Dončić	Sliema Wanderers	Naxxar Lions	6–0	29 September 2001
(Serbia and Montenegro) Danilo Dončić	Sliema Wanderers	Valletta	3–0	12 October 2001
(Serbia and Montenegro) Danilo Dončić	Sliema Wanderers	Ħamrun Spartans	4–0	3 March 2002
(Malta) Adrian Mifsud	Hibernians	Sliema Wanderers	4–2	9 March 2002
(Serbia and Montenegro) Danilo Dončić	Sliema Wanderers	Floriana	3–2	21 April 2002

== Awards ==
=== Monthly awards ===
Month	Player of the Month	
Month	Player	Club
August	(Malta) Sean Sullivan	Valletta
September	(Serbia and Montenegro) Danilo Dončić	Sliema Wanderers
October	(Malta) Matthew Calascione	Birkirkara
November	(Malta) Simon Agius	Lija Athletic
December	(Malta) Daniel Bogdanović	Naxxar Lions
January	(Malta) Joe Brincat	Birkirkara
February	Malta national team	
March	(Malta) Adrian Mifsud	Hibernians
April	(Malta) Adrian Mifsud	Hibernians
May	(Malta) Joe Brincat	Birkirkara
