= 2002–03 Maltese Premier League =

Maltese Premier League
- Season: 2002–03
- Dates: 24 August 2002 – 11 May 2003
- Champions: Sliema Wanderers (24th title)
- Relegated: Marsa; Mosta
- Champions League: Sliema Wanderers
- UEFA Cup: Birkirkara; Valletta
- UEFA Intertoto Cup: Hibernians
- Matches played: 132
- Goals scored: 419 (3.17 per match)
- Top goalscorer: 3 players (18 goals)

The 2002–03 Maltese Premier League was the 23rd season of the Maltese Premier League, and the 88th season of top-tier football in Malta. The league started on 24 August 2002 and finished on 11 May 2003. Hibernians were the defending champions.

== Teams ==
Locations of the 2002–03 Maltese Premier League teams

The following teams were promoted from the First Division at the start of the season:

- Marsaxlokk
- Mosta

From the previous Premier League season, the following teams were relegated to the First Division:

- Naxxar Lions
- Lija Athletic

== First phase ==
=== League table ===
| Pos | Team | Pld | W | D | L | GF | GA | GD | Pts | Qualification |
|---|---|---|---|---|---|---|---|---|---|---|
| 1 | Sliema Wanderers | 18 | 14 | 2 | 2 | 51 | 16 | +35 | 44 | Qualification for the Top Six |
| 2 | Birkirkara | 18 | 13 | 1 | 4 | 46 | 24 | +22 | 40 | Qualification for the Top Six |
| 3 | Valletta | 18 | 12 | 1 | 5 | 42 | 18 | +24 | 37 | Qualification for the Top Six |
| 4 | Hibernians | 18 | 9 | 3 | 6 | 35 | 26 | +9 | 30 | Qualification for the Top Six |
| 5 | Pietà Hotspurs | 18 | 6 | 5 | 7 | 19 | 22 | −3 | 23 | Qualification for the Top Six |
| 6 | Marsaxlokk | 18 | 7 | 0 | 11 | 27 | 38 | −11 | 21 | Qualification for the Top Six |
| 7 | Floriana | 18 | 6 | 2 | 10 | 22 | 31 | −9 | 20 | Qualification for the Play-out |
| 8 | Ħamrun Spartans | 18 | 5 | 2 | 11 | 25 | 40 | −15 | 17 | Qualification for the Play-out |
| 9 | Marsa | 18 | 4 | 4 | 10 | 25 | 45 | −20 | 16 | Qualification for the Play-out |
| 10 | Mosta | 18 | 2 | 4 | 12 | 14 | 46 | −32 | 10 | Qualification for the Play-out |

Source: RSSSSF

=== Results ===
| Home \ Away | BKR | FRN | HIB | ĦMR | MRS | MXK | MST | PTA | SLM | VLT |
|---|---|---|---|---|---|---|---|---|---|---|
| Birkirkara | — | 1–2 | 0–3 | 4–2 | 3–0 | 4–2 | 2–0 | 2–1 | 1–3 | 1–3 |
| Floriana | 0–3 | — | 1–0 | 0–1 | 1–3 | 2–0 | 1–3 | 0–0 | 2–5 | 1–2 |
| Hibernians | 1–3 | 4–1 | — | 3–2 | 2–2 | 1–2 | 2–2 | 1–0 | 2–0 | 2–5 |
| Ħamrun Spartans | 2–3 | 2–0 | 0–3 | — | 2–3 | 1–4 | 2–2 | 2–3 | 0–5 | 2–1 |
| Marsa | 0–6 | 2–3 | 2–2 | 2–1 | — | 1–3 | 1–1 | 0–1 | 0–5 | 1–2 |
| Marsaxlokk | 1–3 | 1–3 | 0–4 | 1–3 | 2–0 | — | 3–0 | 1–0 | 0–3 | 3–5 |
| Mosta | 0–3 | 1–4 | 2–1 | 1–2 | 0–5 | 1–4 | — | 0–2 | 1–3 | 0–4 |
| Pietà Hotspurs | 0–1 | 1–1 | 0–1 | 1–1 | 2–2 | 2–0 | 3–0 | — | 2–2 | 0–3 |
| Sliema Wanderers | 3–3 | 1–0 | 2–3 | 2–0 | 3–1 | 2–0 | 4–0 | 5–0 | — | 2–1 |
| Valletta | 1–3 | 1–0 | 2–0 | 2–0 | 6–0 | 4–0 | 0–0 | 0–1 | 0–2 | — |

Source: RSSSF
Legend: Blue = home team win; Yellow = draw; Red = away team win.

== Second phase ==
=== Top Six ===
The teams placed in the first six positions in the league table qualified for the Top Six, and the points obtained during the first phase were halved (and rounded up) before the start of second phase. As a result, the teams started with the following points before the second phase: Sliema Wanderers 22 points, Birkirkara 20, Valletta 19, Hibernians 15, Pietà Hotspurs 12 and Marsaxlokk 11.

| Pos | Team | Pld | W | D | L | GF | GA | GD | Pts | Qualification | SLM | BKR | VLT | HIB | PTA | MXK |
|---|---|---|---|---|---|---|---|---|---|---|---|---|---|---|---|---|
| 1 | Sliema Wanderers (C) | 10 | 6 | 2 | 2 | 19 | 12 | +7 | 42 | Qualification for the 2003–04 UEFA Champions League | — | 3–2 | 0–2 | 3–0 | 2–1 | 3–0 |
| 2 | Birkirkara | 10 | 5 | 2 | 3 | 18 | 10 | +8 | 37 | Qualification for the 2003–04 UEFA Cup | 0–0 | — | 7–2 | 2–1 | 2–0 | 0–1 |
| 3 | Valletta | 10 | 4 | 4 | 2 | 15 | 13 | +2 | 35 | Qualification for the 2003–04 UEFA Cup | 0–3 | 2–0 | — | 0–0 | 0–0 | 2–1 |
| 4 | Hibernians | 10 | 5 | 2 | 3 | 18 | 10 | +8 | 32 | Qualification for the 2003 UEFA Intertoto Cup | 5–2 | 0–1 | 1–1 | — | 2–1 | 2–0 |
| 5 | Pietà Hotspurs | 10 | 1 | 4 | 5 | 8 | 21 | −13 | 19 | | 2–2 | 0–0 | 0–5 | 0–5 | — | 3–2 |
| 6 | Marsaxlokk | 10 | 1 | 2 | 7 | 7 | 19 | −12 | 16 | | 0–1 | 0–4 | 1–1 | 0–2 | 1–1 | — |

Source: RSSSF
(C) Champions

=== Play-out ===
The teams which finished in the last four league positions were placed in the play-out and at the end of the phase the two lowest-placed teams were relegated to the First Division. The points obtained during the first phase were halved (and rounded up) before the start of second phase. As a result, the teams started with the following points before the second phase: Floriana 10 points, Ħamrun Spartans 9, Marsa 8 and Mosta 5.

| Pos | Team | Pld | W | D | L | GF | GA | GD | Pts | Relegation | ĦMR | FRN | MRS | MST |
|---|---|---|---|---|---|---|---|---|---|---|---|---|---|---|
| 7 | Ħamrun Spartans | 6 | 3 | 3 | 0 | 7 | 3 | +4 | 21 | | — | 0–0 | 1–1 | 3–1 |
| 8 | Floriana | 6 | 2 | 4 | 0 | 10 | 3 | +7 | 20 | | 1–1 | — | 5–1 | 1–1 |
| 9 | Marsa (R) | 6 | 2 | 2 | 2 | 8 | 8 | 0 | 16 | Relegation to the 2003–04 Maltese First Division | 0–1 | 0–0 | — | 5–1 |
| 10 | Mosta (R) | 6 | 0 | 1 | 5 | 3 | 14 | −11 | 6 | Relegation to the 2003–04 Maltese First Division | 0–3 | 0–1 | 0–1 | — |

Source: RSSSF
(R) Relegated

== Season statistics ==
=== Top scorers ===
| Rank | Player | Club | Goals |
|---|---|---|---|
| 1 | (Serbia and Montenegro) Danilo Dončić | Sliema Wanderers | 18 |
| 1 | (Malta) Michael Galea | Birkirkara | 18 |
| 1 | (Malta) Adrian Mifsud | Hibernians | 18 |
| 4 | (Nigeria) Ndubisi Chukunyere | Hibernians | 12 |
| 4 | (Romania) Lucian Dronca | Birkirkara | 12 |
| 6 | (Malta) Daniel Bogdanović | Valletta | 11 |
| 6 | (Nigeria) Chris Oretan | Valletta | 11 |
| 6 | (Malta) Stefan Sultana | Ħamrun Spartans | 11 |
| 6 | (Malta) Johann Zammit | Marsaxlokk | 11 |
| 10 | (Malta) Malcolm Tirchett | Marsa | 10 |

=== Hat-tricks ===
| Player | For | Against | Result | Date |
|---|---|---|---|---|
| (Malta) Daniel Bogdanović | Valletta | Marsaxlokk | 5–3 | 27 October 2002 |
| (Bulgaria) Rumen Galabov | Valletta | Pietà Hotspurs | 5–0 | 6 April 2003 |
| (Malta) Adrian Mifsud | Hibernians | Sliema Wanderers | 5–2 | 20 April 2003 |
| (Malta) Nicolò Baldacchino | Floriana | Marsa | 5–1 | 3 May 2003 |
| (Malta) Adrian Mifsud | Hibernians | Pietà Hotspurs | 5–0 | 4 May 2003 |
