= 2006–07 Maltese Premier League =

Maltese Premier League
- Season: 2006–07
- Dates: 19 August 2006 – 13 May 2007
- Champions: Marsaxlokk (1st title)
- Relegated: St. George's; Marsa
- Champions League: Marsaxlokk
- UEFA Cup: Sliema Wanderers; Hibernians
- UEFA Intertoto Cup: Birkirkara
- Matches played: 132
- Goals scored: 425 (3.22 per match)
- Top goalscorer: Daniel Bogdanović (31 goals)

The 2006–07 Maltese Premier League (known as the BOV Premier League for sponsorship reasons) was the 27th season of the Maltese Premier League, and the 92nd season of top-level league football in Malta. Marsaxlokk won the title while St. George's and Marsa were relegated to the Maltese First Division.

== Teams ==
Locations of the 2006–07 Maltese Premier League teams

The following teams were promoted from the First Division at the start of the season:

- St. George's
- Marsa

From the previous Premier League season, the following teams were relegated to the First Division:

- Mosta
- Ħamrun Spartans

== First round ==
=== League table ===
Pos	Team	Pld	W	D	L	GF	GA	GD	Pts	Qualification
1	Marsaxlokk	18	14	3	1	45	15	+30	45	Qualification for the Top Six
2	Sliema Wanderers	18	10	4	4	33	21	+12	34	Qualification for the Top Six
3	Valletta	18	10	3	5	41	18	+23	33	Qualification for the Top Six
4	Msida Saint-Joseph	18	9	6	3	32	17	+15	33	Qualification for the Top Six
5	Birkirkara	18	9	3	6	32	27	+5	30	Qualification for the Top Six
6	Hibernians	18	8	1	9	31	33	−2	25	Qualification for the Top Six
7	Floriana	18	6	6	6	28	20	+8	24	Qualification for the Play-out
8	St. George's	18	2	6	10	11	33	−22	12	Qualification for the Play-out
9	Pietà Hotspurs	18	2	5	11	16	47	−31	11	Qualification for the Play-out
10	Marsa	18	0	3	15	12	50	−38	3	Qualification for the Play-out

Source: RSSSF

=== Results ===
Home \ Away	BKR	FRN	HIB	MRS	MXK	MSJ	PTA	SLM	STG	VLT
Birkirkara	—	1–0	3–2	3–0	1–0	1–3	2–1	3–3	4–0	1–3
Floriana	1–1	—	4–1	4–1	0–1	1–1	4–0	1–1	3–0	1–2
Hibernians	3–2	1–2	—	4–0	2–2	0–4	0–1	2–1	1–2	3–1
Marsa	1–2	0–2	1–3	—	1–5	0–1	3–5	1–2	1–2	0–3
Marsaxlokk	2–2	4–2	2–1	4–0	—	3–0	5–0	3–2	1–1	1–0
Msida Saint-Joseph	5–1	1–0	3–0	1–1	0–1	—	3–1	1–1	2–0	2–2
Pietà Hotspurs	1–4	1–1	1–2	1–1	0–1	0–3	—	2–2	0–0	0–5
Sliema Wanderers	1–0	2–0	3–1	2–0	1–3	3–0	4–1	—	1–0	1–0
St. George's	0–1	0–0	0–3	1–5	1–3	1–1	1–1	2–3	—	0–2
Valletta	1–0	2–2	1–2	6–1	1–3	1–1	6–0	1–0	4–1	—

Source: RSSSF
Legend: Blue = home team win; Yellow = draw; Red = away team win.

== Second phase ==
=== Top Six ===
The teams placed in the first six positions in the league table qualified for the Top Six, and the points obtained during the first phase were halved (and rounded up) before the start of second phase. As a result, the teams started with the following points before the second phase: Marsaxlokk 23 points, Sliema Wanderers 17, Valletta 17, Msida Saint-Joseph 17, Birkirkara 15 and Hibernians 13.

Pos	Team	Pld	W	D	L	GF	GA	GD	Pts	Qualification	MXK	SLM	BKR	VLT	HIB	MSJ
1	Marsaxlokk (C)	10	8	0	2	29	13	+16	47	Qualification for the 2007–08 UEFA Champions League	—	1–4	6–1	0–1	3–1	2–0
2	Sliema Wanderers	10	5	3	2	17	13	+4	35	Qualification for the 2007–08 UEFA Cup	1–4	—	1–1	2–0	2–1	3–2
3	Birkirkara	10	6	1	3	16	17	−1	34	Qualification for the 2007 UEFA Intertoto Cup	2–3	2–1	—	1–0	2–1	2–1
4	Valletta	10	3	4	3	14	13	+1	30		1–3	1–1	3–0	—	3–1	1–1
5	Hibernians	10	2	2	6	14	19	−5	21	Qualification for the 2007–08 UEFA Cup (Note: Hibernians won the 2006–07 Maltese FA Trophy and thereby qualified for the 2007–08 UEFA Cup.)	2–3	1–1	0–2	2–2	—	2–0
6	Msida Saint-Joseph	10	0	2	8	8	23	−15	19		0–4	0–1	1–3	2–2	1–3	—

Source: RSSSF
(C) Champions

=== Play-out ===
The teams which finished in the last four league positions were placed in the play-out and at the end of the phase the two lowest-placed teams were relegated to the First Division. The points obtained during the first phase were halved (and rounded up) before the start of second phase. As a result, the teams started with the following points before the second phase: Floriana 12 points, St. George's 6, Pietà Hotspurs 5, Marsa 2.

Pos	Team	Pld	W	D	L	GF	GA	GD	Pts	Relegation	FRN	PTA	STG	MRS
7	Floriana	6	3	1	2	13	10	+3	22		—	1–0	3–2	2–2
8	Pietà Hotspurs	6	4	0	2	13	9	+4	18		3–1	—	4–5	2–1
9	St. George's (R)	6	1	1	4	12	19	−7	10	Relegation to the 2007–08 Maltese First Division	2–6	1–2	—	1–1
10	Marsa (R)	6	2	2	2	8	8	0	10	Relegation to the 2007–08 Maltese First Division	1–0	0–2	3–1	—

Source: RSSSF
(R) Relegated

== Season statistics ==
=== Top scorers ===
Rank	Player	Club	Goals
1	(Malta) Daniel Bogdanović	Marsaxlokk	31
2	(Malta) Ivan Woods	Sliema Wanderers	20
3	(Argentina) Sebastián Monesterolo	Valletta	16
4	(Malta) Terence Scerri	Hibernians	14
5	(Nigeria) Daniel Nwoke	Msida Saint-Joseph	13
5	(Nigeria) Ibrahim Babatunde	Msida Saint-Joseph	13
7	(Malta) Etienne Barbara	Birkirkara	11
7	(Malta) Jean Pierre Mifsud Triganza	Birkirkara	11
7	(Malta) André Schembri	Marsaxlokk	11
10	(Malta) Adrian Mifsud	Floriana	9
10	(Malta) Kevin Sammut	Marsaxlokk	9
10	(Malta) Gilbert Agius	Valletta	9

=== Hat-tricks ===
Player	For	Against	Result	Date
(Argentina) Sebastián Monesterolo^{4}	Valletta	Pietà Hotspurs	5–0	20 August 2006
(Malta) Daniel Bogdanović	Marsaxlokk	Floriana	4–2	16 September 2006
(Argentina) Sebastián Monesterolo	Valletta	St. George's	4–1	23 September 2006
(Malta) Trevor Cilia	Floriana	Marsa	4–1	24 September 2006
(Malta) Gilbert Agius^{4}	Valletta	Pietà Hotspurs	6–0	10 December 2006
(Malta) Terence Scerri^{4}	Hibernians	Marsa	4–0	16 December 2006
(Malta) Andrew Scerri	Marsa	Pietà Hotspurs	3–5	21 January 2007
(Netherlands Antilles) Richmar Siberie^{4}	Valletta	Marsa	6–1	3 February 2007
(Malta) Daniel Bogdanović^{4}	Marsaxlokk	Birkirkara	6–1	3 March 2007
(Malta) Ivan Woods	Sliema Wanderers	Msida Saint-Joseph	3–2	15 April 2007

== Awards ==
=== Monthly awards ===
Month	Player of the Month	
Month	Player	Club
August	(Argentina) Sebastián Monesterolo	Valletta
September	(Nigeria) Ibrahim Babatunde	Msida Saint-Joseph
October	(Malta) Ivan Woods	Sliema Wanderers
November/December	(Malta) Daniel Bogdanović	Marsaxlokk
January	(Brazil) Renato Conceição	St. George's
February	(Malta) Gilbert Agius	Valletta
March	(Malta) Daniel Bogdanović	Marsaxlokk
April	(Malta) Roderick Bajada	Sliema Wanderers
May	(Malta) Manolito Micallef	Floriana
