= Maltese Player of the Year =

Maltese football award

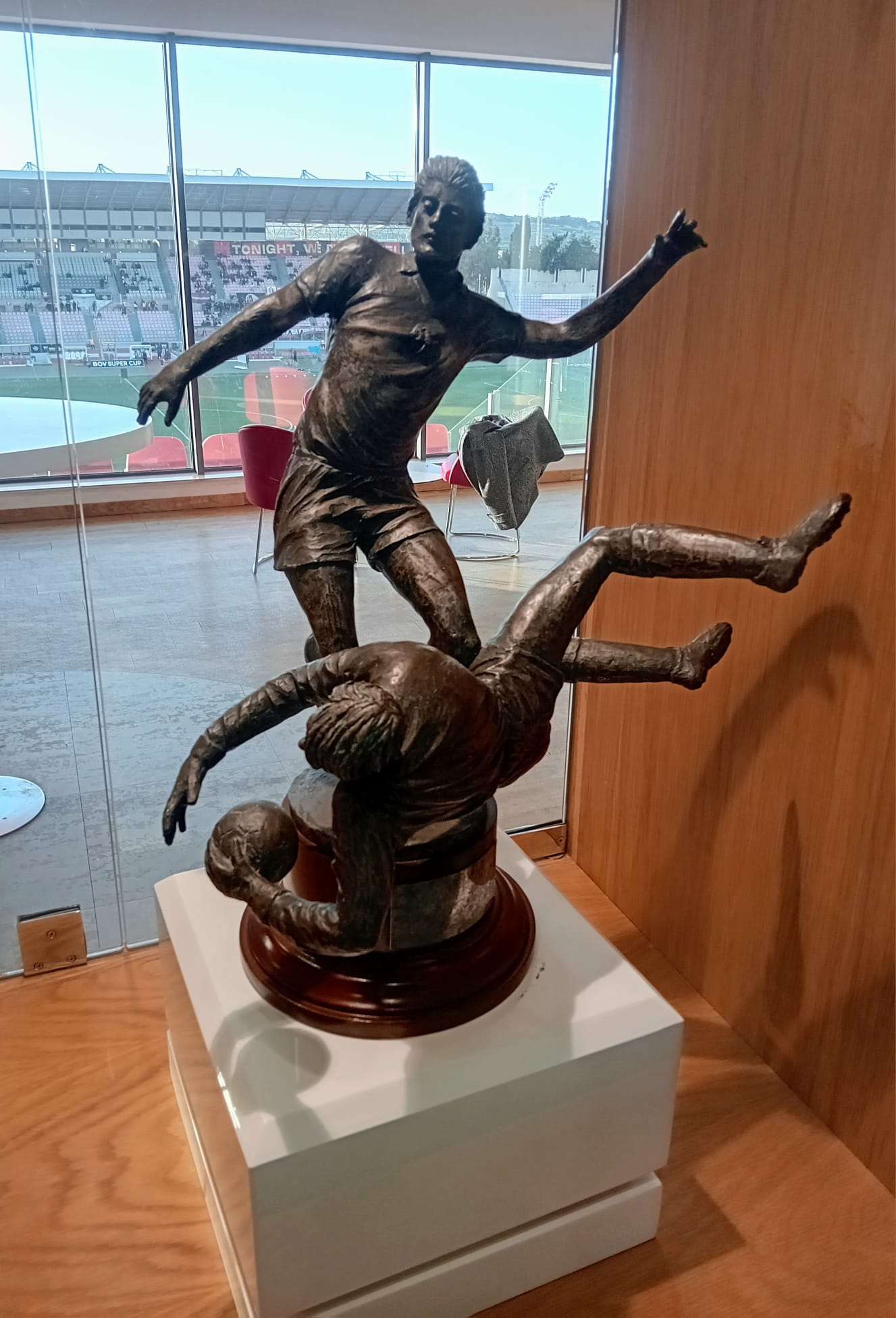
Maltese Player of the Year trophy (since 2000)

The Maltese Player of the Year Award is an annual award given to the player who is adjudged to have been the best of the year in Maltese football. The award has been presented since the 1954–55 season and the winner is chosen by a vote amongst the members of the players' trade union, the Professional Footballers' Association (MFA).

The first winner of the award was Floriana player Lolly Debattista, and the current holder is Jurgen Degabriele of Hibernians.

== Winners ==
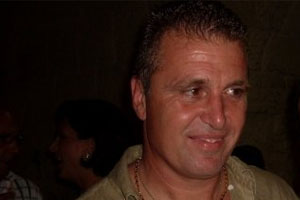
Nicky Saliba won the award in the 1991–92 and 1998–99 seasons.

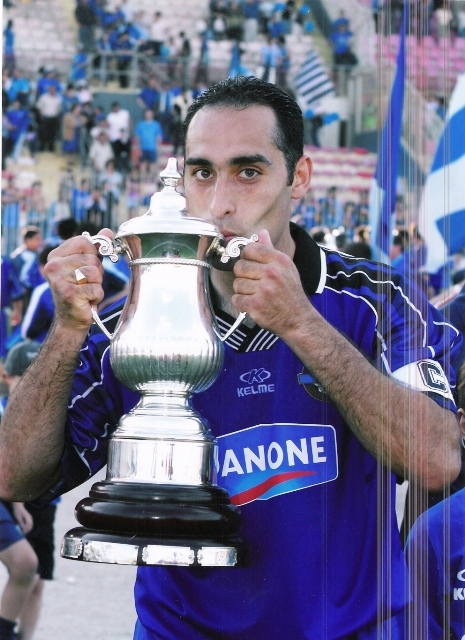
Noel Turner won the award in the 1995–96 and 2002–03 seasons.

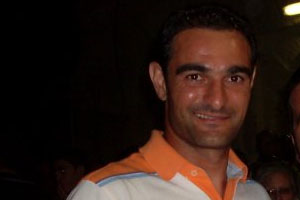
Gilbert Agius won the award three times (1996–97, 2000–01 and 2007–08).

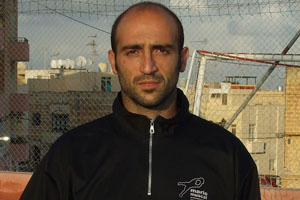
Mario Muscat won the award in 1997–98.

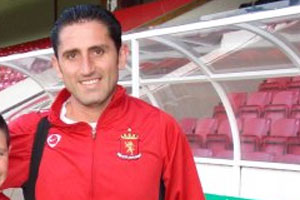
Stefan Giglio won the award in 2003–04.

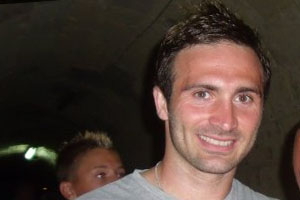
Kevin Sammut is the only Marsaxlokk player to win the award in the 2007–08 season.

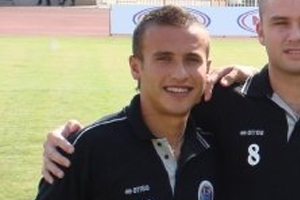
Andrew Cohen is the only player to win the award four times (2004–05, 2005–06, 2014–15 and 2017–18).

Key
Player (X)	Name of the player and number of times they had won the award at that point (if more than one)
§	Denotes the club were Premier League champions in the same season

Maltese Player of the Year winners
Year	Player	Club	Notes
1954–55	Lolly Debattista	Floriana^{§}	
1955–56	Tony Nicholl	Sliema Wanderers^{§}	
1956–57	Joe Bonnici	Sliema Wanderers^{§}	
1957–58	Joe Cilia	Valletta	
1958–59	Alfred Vella James	Floriana	
1959–60	Louis Theobald	Hibernians	
1960–61	Joe Zammit	Valletta	
1961–62	Lolly Borg	Floriana^{§}	
1962–63	Edwin Schembri	Valletta^{§}	
1963–64	Joe Cilia (2)	Valletta	
1964–65	unassigned		
1965–66	Ronnie Cocks	Sliema Wanderers^{§}	
1966–67	Eddie Theobald	Hibernians^{§}	
1967–68	Alfred Debono	Floriana^{§}	
1968–69	John Privitera	Hibernians^{§}	
1969–70	Joe Cini	Sliema Wanderers	
1970–71	Eddie Theobald (2)	Hibernians	
1971–72	Edward Darmanin	Sliema Wanderers^{§}	
1972–73	Freddie Debono	Valletta	
1973–74	Willie Vassallo	Floriana	
1974–75	Eddie Vella	Valletta	
1975–76	John Holland	Floriana	
1976–77	Raymond Xuereb	Floriana^{§}	
1977–78	John Holland (2)	Floriana	
1978–79	Ġużi Xuereb	Hibernians^{§}	
1979–80	Norman Buttigieg	Hibernians	
1980–81	Leli Fabri	Sliema Wanderers	
1981–82	Ernest Spiteri Gonzi	Hibernians^{§}	
1982–83	Carmel Busuttil	Rabat Ajax	
1983–84	Charles Muscat	Żurrieq	
1984–85	Leonard Farrugia	Valletta	
1985–86	Carmel Busuttil (2)	Rabat Ajax^{§}	
1986–87	Raymond Vella	Ħamrun Spartans^{§}	
1987–88	John Buttigieg	Sliema Wanderers	
1988–89	Charles Scerri	Hibernians	
1989–90	Michael Degorgio	Ħamrun Spartans	
1990–91	Raymond Vella (2)	Ħamrun Spartans^{§}	
1991–92	Nicky Saliba	Valletta^{§}	
1992–93	Joe Brincat	Ħamrun Spartans	
1993–94	Silvio Vella	Rabat Ajax	
1994–95	Michael Woods	Hibernians^{§}	
1995–96	Noel Turner	Sliema Wanderers^{§}	
1996–97	Gilbert Agius	Valletta^{§}	
1997–98	Mario Muscat	Hibernians	
1998–99	Nicky Saliba (2)	Valletta^{§}	
1999–2000	Ernest Barry	Sliema Wanderers	
2000–01	Gilbert Agius (2)	Valletta^{§}	
2001–02	Adrian Mifsud	Hibernians^{§}	
2002–03	Noel Turner (2)	Sliema Wanderers^{§}	
2003–04	Stefan Giglio	Sliema Wanderers^{§}	
2004–05	Andrew Cohen	Hibernians	
2005–06	Andrew Cohen (2)	Hibernians	
2006–07	Kevin Sammut	Marsaxlokk^{§}	
2007–08	Gilbert Agius (3)	Valletta^{§}	
2008–09	Clayton Failla	Hibernians^{§}	
2009–10	Shaun Bajada	Birkirkara^{§}	
2010–11	Roderick Briffa	Valletta^{§}	
2011–12	Clayton Failla (2)	Hibernians	
2012–13	Paul Fenech	Birkirkara^{§}	
2013–14	Ryan Fenech	Valletta^{§}	
2014–15	Andrew Cohen (3)	Hibernians^{§}	
2015–16	Roderick Briffa (2)	Valletta^{§}	
2016–17	Bjorn Kristensen	Hibernians^{§}	
2017–18	Andrew Cohen (4)	Gżira United	
2018–19	Andrei Agius	Hibernians	
2019–20	Steve Borg	Valletta	
2020–21	Matthew Guillaumier	Ħamrun Spartans^{§}	
2021–22	Jurgen Degabriele	Hibernians^{§}	
2022–23	Matthew Guillaumier (2)	Ħamrun Spartans^{§}	
2023–24	Luke Montebello	Ħamrun Spartans^{§}	
2024–25	Alexander Satariano	Birkirkara	
2025–26	Joseph Mbong	Ħamrun Spartans	

== Breakdown of winners ==
=== Winners by club ===
Club	Number of wins	Winning years
Hibernians	19	1959–60, 1966–67, 1968–69, 1970–71, 1978–79, 1979–80, 1981–82, 1988–89, 1994–95, 1997–98, 2001–02, 2004–05, 2005–06, 2008–09, 2011–12, 2014–15, 2016–17, 2018–19, 2021–22
Valletta	15	1957–58, 1960–61, 1962–63, 1963–64, 1972–73, 1974–75, 1984–85, 1991–92, 1996–97, 1998–99, 2000–01, 2007–08, 2013–14, 2015–16, 2019–20
Sliema Wanderers	11	1955–56, 1956–57, 1965–66, 1969–70, 1971–72, 1980–81, 1987–88, 1995–96, 1999–2000, 2002–03, 2003–04
Floriana	8	1954–55, 1958–59, 1961–62, 1967–68, 1973–74, 1975–76, 1976–77, 1977–78
Ħamrun Spartans	8	1986–87, 1989–90, 1990–91, 1992–93, 2020–21, 2022–23, 2023–24, 2025–26
Rabat Ajax	3	1982–83, 1985–86, 1993–94
Birkirkara	3	2009–10, 2012–13, 2024–25
Żurrieq	1	1983–84
Marsaxlokk	1	2006–07
Gżira United	1	2017–18
