= List of Malta international footballers (10–24 caps) =

The Malta national football team represents the country of Malta in international association football and is controlled by the Malta Football Association (MFA), the local governing body of football which was founded in 1900. The MFA became a member of the Fédération Internationale de Football Association (FIFA) in 1959 and a year later joined the Union of European Football Associations (UEFA). Prior to that, on 24 February 1957, the team played its first official international match at the Empire Stadium against Austria, a 3–2 defeat. The first goal was scored by Tony Cauchi.

As of April 2026, Malta has played 463 international fixtures, winning 66, drawing 77 and losing 320. The team's most frequent opponent has been Iceland, meeting the side 15 times, winning 3, drawing 1 and losing 11. In global and continental competitions, Malta has competed in qualification groups for both the UEFA European Championship, since 1962, and the FIFA World Cup, since 1974, but has failed to qualify for any tournament finals.

Since 1957, more than 300 players have made at least one international appearance for the team. The following is a list of those players who earned between 10 and 24 caps for Malta.

== Key ==
Positions key
GK	Goalkeeper
DF	Defender
MF	Midfielder
FW	Forward

Position
Playing positions are listed according to the player's preferred position, and not based on tactical formations that were employed at the time.
Caps and goals
Caps and goals are composed of FIFA World Cup, UEFA European Championship matches and each competition's required qualification matches, as well as numerous international friendly tournaments and matches.

== Players ==
Player	Position	Caps	Goals	Date of debut	Debut against	Date of last match	Last match against	Ref
Vincent Magro	MF	24	2	28 August 1973	Canada	28 October 1979	Turkey	
Michael Spiteri	DF	24	1	5 November 1993	Egypt	14 November 2001	Canada	
Cain Attard	MF	23	2	27 May 2016	Czech Republic	26 March 2024	Belarus	
Ernest Barry	GK	23	0	14 August 1996	Iceland	6 June 2001	Denmark	
Ian Ciantar	DF	23	0	15 August 2001	Bosnia and Herzegovina	7 February 2007	Austria	
Stephen Wellman	MF	22	1	16 February 2004	Estonia	20 August 2008	Estonia	
Peter Pullicino	MF	22	0	27 May 2004	Germany	4 February 2008	Iceland	
Martin Scicluna	DF	22	0	6 September 1984	Israel	23 November 1988	Cyprus	
Ronnie Cocks	FW	21	1	13 February 1966	Libya	4 March 1978	Tunisia	
Jesmond Zerafa	FW	21	1	4 October 1989	Israel	19 June 1993	Portugal	
Joe Sant Fournier	MF	21	1	26 May 1992	Latvia	2 September 1998	Germany	
Michael Woods	DF	21	0	5 December 1984	Italy U-21 (Note: The match is recognised as an official International A Match by the Malta Football Association)	2 June 1996	FR Yugoslavia	
Carlo Mamo	DF	21	0	9 February 2002	Jordan	11 October 2011	Israel	
Ivan Zammit	MF	21	0	16 August 1995	Albania	14 October 1998	Republic of Ireland	
Ernest Spiteri-Gonzi	FW	20	3	25 October 1978	Wales	21 December 1983	Spain	
Norman Buttigieg	DF	20	1	25 February 1979	West Germany	21 December 1983	Spain	
Carlo Seychell	FW	20	0	15 October 1972	West Germany	25 February 1979	West Germany	
Brandon Paiber	MF	20	0	15 November 2019	Spain	4 October 2026	Andorra	
Shaun Dimech	FW	19	2	7 October 2020	Gibraltar	19 June 2023	Ukraine	
Edward Herrera	MF	19	1	18 November 2009	Bulgaria	12 June 2015	Bulgaria	
Alfred Mizzi	GK	19	0	18 December 1960	Tunisia	5 March 1977	Tunisia	
Joe Cini	FW	18	2	24 February 1957	Austria	6 May 1972	Hungary	
Leonard Farrugia	FW	18	2	4 March 1978	Tunisia	24 January 1987	Italy	
Eddie Theobald	MF	18	2	18 June 1961	Italy C	30 April 1972	Austria	
Jean Paul Farrugia	FW	18	2	4 June 2014	Gibraltar	30 May 2021	Northern Ireland	
Louis Arpa	FW	18	1	27 April 1969	Austria	27 November 1977	Turkey	
Ferdinando Apap	DF	18	1	29 May 2018	Armenia	14 October 2023	Italy	
Jonathan Holland	MF	18	0	28 April 1999	Iceland	12 February 2003	Kazakhstan	
Dunstan Vella	MF	18	0	1 June 2018	Georgia	14 November 2024	Liechtenstein	
Terence Scerri	FW	17	1	6 September 2006	Turkey	1 April 2009	Hungary	
Anton Camilleri	DF	17	0	4 January 1970	Luxembourg	29 October 1977	East Germany	
Jodi Jones	FW	17	0	23 September 2022	Estonia	12 October 2025	Bosnia and Herzegovina	
Myles Beerman	DF	17	0	6 June 2017	Ukraine	27 September 2026	Liechtenstein	
Yannick Yankam	MF	16	1	23 March 2023	North Macedonia	9 October 2025	Netherlands	
Lawrence Attard	DF	16	0	26 April 1995	Belarus	8 June 1997	Faroe Islands	
Claude Mattocks	MF	16	0	11 December 2003	Poland	2 September 2006	Bosnia and Herzegovina	
Joseph Xuereb	MF	15	1	5 February 1979	West Germany	14 October 1982	Bulgaria	
George Ciantar	DF	15	0	25 November 1972	Austria	18 March 1979	Turkey	
Adrian Mifsud	FW	15	0	3 February 1999	Poland	10 September 2003	Israel	
Ilyas Chouaref	FW	15	0	21 March 2025	Finland	4 October 2026	Andorra	
Dennis Fenech	MF	14	0	28 February 1976	West Germany	15 November 1981	Poland	
Mario Schembri	DF	14	0	10 March 1976	Libya	17 December 1983	Netherlands	
Joseph John Aquilina	MF	14	0	2 June 1979	Wales	16 November 1986	Sweden	
Massimo Grima	MF	14	0	6 August 1997	Hungary	17 November 2010	Croatia	
William Camenzuli	DF	14	0	14 November 2001	Canada	1 March 2006	Georgia	
Alfred Debono	GK	13	0	8 March 1964	Italy C	29 October 1977	East Germany	
Adam Magri Overend	MF	13	0	8 October 2021	Slovenia	27 September 2026	Liechtenstein	
Dennis Mizzi	FW	12	2	31 October 1984	Czechoslovakia	20 December 1987	Portugal	
Edward Aquilina	FW	12	1	13 February 1966	Libya	10 March 1976	Libya	
Mario Farrugia	DF	12	0	11 November 1981	East Germany	21 December 1983	Spain	
Nikolai Muscat	MF	12	0	18 November 2019	Norway	7 September 2024	Moldova	
Paul Sixsmith	DF	11	1	6 February 1998	Albania	28 April 1999	Iceland	
Tristan Caruana	MF	11	1	26 March 2018	Finland	14 November 2021	Slovakia	
Charles Scibberas	GK	11	0	28 February 1976	West Germany	9 October 1983	Libya	
Constantino Consiglio	DF	11	0	4 March 1978	Tunisia	16 November 1983	Republic of Ireland	
Irvin Cardona	FW	11	3	4 September 2025	Lithuania	4 October 2026	Luxembourg	
Jesmond Delia	DF	11	0	26 April 1989	Northern Ireland	6 September 1995	Luxembourg	
Roderick Bajada	MF	11	0	16 February 2004	Estonia	20 August 2008	Estonia	
John Hutchinson	MF	11	0	5 June 2009	Czech Republic	11 October 2011	Israel	
Terence Vella	FW	11	0	14 November 2012	Liechtenstein	16 November 2014	Bulgaria	
Gabriel Mentz	DF	11	0	13 October 2024	Moldova	4 October 2026	Andorra	
Joe Zarb	FW	10	1	4 October 1989	Austria	30 March 1994	Slovakia	
Denis Cauchi	DF	10	0	16 November 1986	Sweden	31 March 1997	Slovakia	
Joe Cilia	DF	10	0	24 February 1957	Austria	8 March 1964	Italy C	
John Mintoff	MF	10	0	14 August 2012	San Marino	26 March 2019	Spain	
Kemar Reid	MF	10	0	17 November 2023	England	9 October 2025	Netherlands	

== References and notes ==
=== Additional references ===
- Strack-Zimmermann, Benjamin. "Malta (2018)". National-Football-Teams.com.
- Mamrud, Roberto. "Malta - Record International Players". Rec.Sport.Soccer Statistics Foundation.
