= List of Malta national football team captains =

The first Malta captain was Salvinu Schembri who captained Malta in their first official match against Austria on 24 February 1957. Since its first competitive match, more than 300 players have made at least one international appearance for the team. Of them, 32 have served as captain of the national team. The record holder is currently Michael Mifsud with 48.

== List of captains ==
Appearances and goals are composed of FIFA World Cup, UEFA European Championship matches and each competition's required qualification matches, as well as numerous international friendly tournaments and matches. Players are initially listed by number of matches captained, followed by number of international caps attained. If the number of matches captained and the number of caps earned are equal, then the player who captained the national team first is listed first. Statistics correct as of 10 September 2018.

#	Player	Malta career	Caps as captain	Total caps	First captaincy	Last captaincy	Ref
1	Michael Mifsud	2000–	48	133	27 May 2004	10 September 2018	
2	Raymond Vella	1984–1994	48	67	10 February 1985	16 February 1994	
3	John Holland	1974–1987	42	61	6 September 1977	24 January 1987	
4	Carmel Busuttil	1982–2001	36	113	17 February 1993	25 April 2001	
5	Gilbert Agius	1993–2009	32	120	11 February 2002	9 September 2009	
6	David Carabott	1987–2005	19	122	28 February 2001	9 February 2005	
7	Chris Laferla	1986–1998	16	65	10 February 1992	6 September 1995	
8	André Schembri	2006–	14	90	25 March 2015	26 March 2018	
9	Silvio Vella	1988–2000	13	90	7 February 1996	6 August 1997	
10	Brian Said	1996–2009	12	91	4 September 2004	18 November 2009	
11	Ronnie Cocks	1966–1978	12	21	11 October 1970	4 September 1974	
12	Roderick Briffa	2003–	9	97	7 October 2011	31 May 2016	
13	Willie Vassallo	1970–1977	9	28	22 December 1974	27 November 1977	
14	John Buttigieg	1984–2000	6	97	21 May 1988	9 February 1996	
15	Luke Dimech	1999–2013	6	78	18 August 2004	14 November 2012	
16	Joe Cini	1957–1972	6	18	13 February 1966	18 June 1971	
17	Joe Brincat	1987–2004	5	103	11 October 1997	14 February 2004	
18	Edward Darmanin	1969–1977	5	28	10 March 1976	30 April 1977	
19	Lolly Borg	1957–1962	5	8	18 June 1961	8 December 1962	
20	Jeffrey Chetcuti	1994–2005	2	69	13 February 2002	16 February 2004	
21	Nicky Saliba	1988–2001	2	68	10 February 1998	6 June 1998	
22	Gareth Sciberras	2003–	2	52	17 November 2010	26 March 2017	
23	Salvinu Schembri	1957–1958	2	3	24 February 1957	25 January 1958	
24	Pullu Demanuele	1957–1958	2	3	8 March 1959	8 December 1960	
25	Justin Haber	2004–2016	1	56	28 March 2007	28 March 2007	
26	Alex Azzopardi	1982–1991	1	45	10 February 1989	10 February 1989	
27	Freddie Mizzi	1960–1977	1	19	20 December 1970	20 December 1970	
28	Louis Arpa	1969–1977	1	18	28 September 1973	28 September 1973	
29	Mario Schembri	1976–1983	1	14	15 May 1983	15 May 1983	
30	Joe Cilia	1957–1964	1	10	8 March 1964	8 March 1964	
31	John Privitera	1962–1970	1	7	27 April 1969	27 April 1969	
32	Josef Mifsud	2007–2008	1	6	17 November 2007	17 November 2007	

== See also ==
- List of Malta international footballers
