= Frank Zammit =

Maltese footballer

Frankie Zammit
Personal information
- Full name: Frank Zammit
- Date of birth: 27 October 1935 (age 91)
- Place of birth: Valletta, Crown Colony of Malta
- Position: Striker

Youth career
- Stella Maris School

Senior career*
Years	Team	Apps	(Gls)
1953–1954	Melita	5	(0)
1955–1969	Valletta	153	(71)
- Mosta
Total		158	(71)

International career
1959–1962	Malta	6	(0)
1964	Malta XI	1	(0)

Managerial career
- 1976–1977: Mellieħa
- 1978–1979: Birkirkara
- * Club domestic league appearances and goals

Frankie Zammit (born 27 October 1935) is a Maltese retired footballer.

== Club career ==
Born in Valletta, Zammit started his career at Melita before joining hometown club Valletta in 1955 after Melita was demoted to the Second Division. A prolific striker, five times Zammit scored 4 goals in a match. He was top goalscorer in the Maltese Premier League in 1960.

== International career ==
Zammit made his debut for Malta in a March 1959 friendly match away against Tunisia and earned a total of 7 caps (1 unofficial, no goals). His final international was a March 1964 match against Italy.

== Honours ==
Valletta

- Maltese Premier League: 3

1959, 1960, 1963

- FA Trophy: 5

1960, 1964
