= Tommy Taylor (Irish footballer) =

Irish footballer

Personal information
- Full name: Thomas Taylor
- Place of birth: Dublin, Ireland
- Positions: Goalkeeper; centre-forward

Senior career*
Years	Team	Apps	(Gls)
1954–1955	Home Farm		
1955–1958	Waterford		
1959–1964	Valletta		
1964–1967	Waterford		

International career
1958	Republic of Ireland	1	(0)
- * Club domestic league appearances and goals

Thomas Taylor, commonly known as Tommy Taylor, is an Irish former footballer who played as a goalkeeper, and briefly as a centre-forward, and made one appearance for the Republic of Ireland national team.

== Career ==
Taylor made his first and only international appearance for the Republic of Ireland on 5 October 1958 in a friendly against Poland, coming on as a 68th-minute substitute for Jimmy O'Neill. The home match, which was played at Dalymount Park in Dublin, finished as a 2–2 draw with Taylor not conceding while in goal.

In early 1959, Taylor moved to Malta for his job with an Irish construction firm, and subsequently joined Valletta. He began his career at Valletta as a centre-forward, but shortly later returned to his usual position as goalkeeper, playing for the club until mid-1974 when he returned to Ireland.

== Career statistics ==
=== International ===
Republic of Ireland
Year	Apps	Goals
1958	1	0
Total	1	0

== Honours ==
Waterford

- League of Ireland: 1965–66
- Munster Senior Cup: 1955–56, 1956–57, 1965–66, 1966–67

Valletta

- Maltese First Division: 1958–59, 1959–60, 1962–63
- Maltese FA Trophy: 1959–60, 1963–64
- Cassar Cup: 1958–59
- Scicluna Cup: 1961, 1964
