= Sammy Nicholl =

Maltese footballer (1934–2023)

Personal information
- Full name: Samuel J Nicholl
- Date of birth: 7 May 1934
- Place of birth: Sliema, Malta
- Date of death: 18 April 2023 (aged 88)
- Position: Striker

Youth career
- Sliema Shamrocks

Senior career*
Years	Team	Apps	(Gls)
1951-1952	Żebbuġ Rangers		
1952–1964	Sliema Wanderers	140	(81)

International career
1957-1962	Malta	7	(1)
1953-1958	Malta XI	15	(3)
- * Club domestic league appearances and goals

Sammy Nicholl (7 May 1934 – 18 April 2023) was a Maltese footballer who played as a striker or winger.

== Club career ==
Born in Sliema, Nicholl started his career at Żebbuġ Rangers but spent the most of his career at hometown club Sliema Wanderers for whom he would score 81 goals in 140 top division games. He debuted for them in October 1952 against Birkirkara and won 5 league titles with The Blues and twice became the league's top goalscorer.

== International career ==
Nicholl made his debut for Malta in a February 1957 friendly match against Austria and earned a total of 7 caps, scoring 1 goal. He scored that goal on his debut, which was Mallta's first ever international game and first ever goal as well. His final international was a December 1962 European Championship qualification match against Denmark.

== Personal life ==
Nicholl was a nephew of Tony Nicholl, who is regarded as one of the greatest players in the history of Maltese football.

He also worked at Barclays Bank in Malta and after his playing career he worked as a sports journalist and pundit. He died in 2023, aged 88.

== Honours ==
- Maltese Premier League: 1954, 1956, 1957, 1964, 1965
- Maltese FA Trophy: 1956, 1959, 1963
