= Alfred Mizzi =

Maltese footballer

Freddie Mizzi
Personal information
- Full name: Alfred Mizzi
- Date of birth: 10 January 1941 (age 85)
- Place of birth: Floriana, Malta
- Position: Goalkeeper

Youth career
- San Girgor Catholic Action

Senior career*
Years	Team	Apps	(Gls)
1955–1957	Melita	20	(0)
1957–1960	Floriana	31	(0)
1960–1977	Hibernians	215	(0)
Total		266	(0)

International career
1960-1977	Malta	18	(0)
1961	Malta XI	1	(0)
- * Club domestic league appearances and goals

Alfred Mizzi (born 10 January 1941 in Floriana, Malta) is a Maltese retired footballer.

== Club career ==
Born in Floriana and nicknamed Il-Pampalun, Mizzi played the majority of his career for Hibernians as a goalkeeper, winning three league titles and three domestic cups. He had made his senior debut for Melita on 11 December 1955 against Birżebbuġa St. Peter's.

== International career ==
Mizzi made his debut for Malta in a December 1960 friendly match against Tunisia and earned a total of 19 caps (1 unofficial). His final international was another friendly against Tunisia, on 5 March 1977.

== Personal life ==
Mizzi was married to Carmen Mallia and they had three children together.

== Honours ==
Floriana

- Maltese Premier League: 1958
- Maltese FA Trophy: 1958

Hibernians

- Maltese Premier League: 1961, 1967,1969
- Maltese FA Trophy: 1962, 1970, 1971
