= Michael Woods (Maltese footballer) =

Maltese footballer (born 1962)

Personal information
- Date of birth: 23 July 1962 (age 64)
- Place of birth: Malta
- Positions: Full back; central midfielder

Youth career
- 1980–1981: Gżira United

Senior career*
Years	Team	Apps	(Gls)
1981–1983	Gżira United		
1983–1984	Sliema Wanderers		
1984–1987	Hibernians		
1992–1997	Hibernians		
1997–2000	Naxxar Lions		

International career
1984–1996	Malta	21	(0)

Managerial career
- 2011–2012: Floriana
- 2012–2013: Hibernians
- 2017–2018: St. Andrews
- * Club domestic league appearances and goals

Michael Woods (born 23 July 1962) is a Maltese former football player and manager. He played mostly as a full back, but also in central midfield.

Woods played for Gżira United, Sliema Wanderers, Hibernians, and Naxxar Lions. With Hibernians, he won the Maltese Premier League in two consecutive seasons, and was named Maltese Player of the Year after winning the second title in 1994–95. He played 21 games for the Malta national team between 1984 and 1996. As a manager, he won the Maltese FA Trophy with Floriana in 2011 and Hibernians in 2013.

== Club career ==
Woods was raised in Gżira and educated at Gżira Primary School and Hamrun Lyceum, both of which produced several leading Maltese footballers. He joined Gżira United as a youth player in 1980 and made his debut in the Maltese Premier League on 27 September 1981, in a season opener against Hibernians. His team lost 3–0, and he made 14 appearances over the season.

In 1983, he became one of several players to transfer from Gżira United to Sliema Wanderers, but was underused in his only season before joining Hibernians. He was a regular player for the team from Paola, but in 1987 he emigrated to England.

Woods returned to Hibernians in 1992, and in his second spell he won two league titles (1994 and 1995), one Maltese Super Cup, and was named Maltese Player of the Year for 1994–95. In 1997, he joined Naxxar Lions, where his playing career ended three years later.

== International career ==
Woods made his debut for the Malta national team on 5 December 1984 in a 2–1 loss to Italy under-21. Eleven days later he made his competitive debut in a 3–2 defeat against West Germany, also at the National Stadium in Ta' Qali, in 1986 FIFA World Cup qualification. Having had a hiatus of six years between 1988 and 1994, he gained his 21st and final cap on 2 June 1996, in a 6–0 loss away to FR Yugoslavia in 1998 FIFA World Cup qualification.

== Managerial career ==
Woods coached at Naxxar and then assistant to Robert Gatt at Hibernians, who won the league in 2001. In 2010, he joined Floriana, and became head coach in February 2011 when technical director Todor Raykov was dismissed. On 22 May, his team won the Maltese FA Trophy by defeating rivals Valletta with a goal by Ivan Woods. He resigned on 16 March 2012 after a run of five games without a win put the third-placed club further from the top.

In June 2012, Woods joined Hibernians on a three-year contract, replacing Mark Miller who had moved to league champions Valletta. His first games in July were UEFA Europa League first qualifying round games against FK Sarajevo, losing 5–2 away in the Bosnian capital then drawing 4–4 to be eliminated 9–6 on aggregate; on 3 August his team lost the Super Cup 3–1 to Valletta. He left by mutual consent in May 2013, having lost a title play-off 3–1 to Birkirkara and won the FA Trophy by the same score against Qormi.

Woods was appointed by St. Andrews in 2017–18.

== Honours ==
=== Player ===
Hibernians

- Maltese Premier League: 1993–94, 1994–95
- Maltese Super Cup: 1994

Individual

- Maltese Player of the Year: 1994–95

=== Manager ===
Floriana

- Maltese FA Trophy: 2010–11

Hibernians

- Maltese FA Trophy: 2012–13
