= Willie Vassallo =

Maltese footballer (1949–2025)

Personal information
- Date of birth: 14 September 1949
- Place of birth: Gżira, Malta
- Date of death: 6 April 2025 (aged 75)
- Place of death: Melbourne, Victoria, Australia
- Position: Midfielder

Senior career*
| Years | Team | Apps | (Gls) |
| 1965–1966 | Gżira United | | |
| 1966–1978 | Floriana | 164 | |
| 1977 | → Green Gully (loan) | | |
| 1978–1985 | Green Gully | | |

International career
| 1970-1977 | Malta | 28 | (2) |

Managerial career
- 2004-2005: Floriana
- * Club domestic league appearances and goals

Willie Vassallo (14 September 1949 – 6 April 2025) was a Maltese footballer who played as a midfielder.

== Club career ==
Born in Gżira, Vassallo started his career at hometown club Gżira United before embarking on a long and successful career with Floriana winning league titles and three domestic cups. He was named Maltese Player of the Year in 1974.

In 1977 he joined Australian side Green Gully, a club with ties to Floriana, on loan but made that move permanent six months later. He would make over 164 appearances for the club and played in the National Soccer League for them.

== International career ==
Vassallo made his debut for Malta in a January 1970 friendly match against Luxembourg and earned a total of 28 caps, scoring 2 goals. His final international was a November 1977 match in 1978 FIFA World Cup qualification against Turkey.

== Post-playing career ==
Vassallo worked in Australian soccer for 27 years, before returning to Malta to take charge at Floriana in 2004.

Vassallo was married to Antoinette, and had a daughter, Verlie, and a son, Brandon. He died in Melbourne on 6 April 2025, at the age of 75.

== Honours ==
- Maltese Premier League: 1968, 1970, 1973, 1975, 1977
- Maltese FA Trophy: 1967, 1972, 1976
