= Edwin Farrugia =

Maltese footballer

Personal information
- Date of birth: 9 July 1952 (age 74)
- Place of birth: Floriana, Malta
- Position: Defender

Senior career*
Years	Team	Apps	(Gls)
1969–1982	Floriana	148	(2)
1982–1987	Ħamrun Spartans	53	(0)
Total		201	(2)

International career^{‡}
1973–1983	Malta	39	(0)
- * Club domestic league appearances and goals as of 29 June 2024 ‡ National team caps and goals as of 29 June 2024

Edwin Farrugia (born 9 July 1952) is a retired footballer, who represented the Malta national team.

== Club career ==
During his career, he played as a defender for Floriana and Ħamrun Spartans, making his debut for the former in October 1969 against Gżira United and playing his final game for the latter in the 1986–1987 season. He had joined Spartans in 1983 among many other top players at the start of club president Victor Tedesco's reign.

== International career ==
Farrugia made his debut for Malta in a November 1973 World Cup qualification match against Sweden and earned a total of 39 caps, scoring no goals. His final international was a December 1983 European Championship qualification match away against the Netherlands.

== Honours ==
Floriana

- Maltese Premier League: 4

1970, 1973, 1975, 1977

- FA Trophy: 3

1972, 1976, 1981

Ħamrun Spartans

- Maltese Premier League: 2

1983, 1987

- FA Trophy: 2

1983, 1984
