= Norman Buttigieg =

Maltese footballer

Personal information
- Date of birth: February 18, 1956 (age 70)
- Place of birth: Paola, Malta
- Position: Sweeper

Youth career
- De Paule Band Club
- –1972: Hibernians

Senior career*
Years	Team	Apps	(Gls)
1972–1985	Hibernians		
1987–1989	St. Patrick		
1989–1994	Ħamrun Spartans	9	(0)
1994–1996	Marsaxlokk		
1996–1998	Luxol St. Andrews		

International career
1979–1983	Malta	20	(1)
- * Club domestic league appearances and goals

Norman Buttigieg (born 18 February 1956) is a Maltese former footballer who played as a sweeper.

At the club level he played primarily with Hibernians in the 1970s and 1980s, winning three league titles at the club. He also earned 20 caps with the Malta national team.

== Playing career ==
Buttigieg was born on 18 February 1956 in the Maltese town of Paola, and began playing football as a child on the field behind the Christ the King Parish Church. As a teenager, he joined De Paule Band Club of the Paola District League, a local competition organized to identify talent for Hibernians' youth teams. He was quickly spotted and selected for the Hibernians under-18 squad.

In 1972–73, he and the rest of the squad were promoted en bloc to the first team, which was playing in the Maltese Premier League (then known as the First Division). Buttigieg went on the play over 200 matches across 13 seasons with Hibernians, winning three Premier League titles and two Maltese FA Trophies, including the first double in club history in 1981–82 when they defeated Sliema Wanderers in the FA Trophy final on the 60th anniversary of the club's founding. He anchored a defense that once led the team on a 37-game unbeaten streak, undoubtedly one of the greatest periods in club history. However he decided to suddenly retire at the age of 29 in 1985.

Buttigieg made a comeback with First Division club St. Patrick two years later, but the team was relegated in his first season. He stayed with the team and led them to a Second Division title in his second year. His play attracted the attention of Premier League club Ħamrun Spartans, who signed the veteran to a deal. He made nine league appearances in 1989–90 before playing somewhat of an assistant coaching role for four years while still on the books. He returned to action in 1994 with Marsaxlokk in the Second Division, playing there for two years before finishing his career at Luxol St. Andrews. After his playing career he started coaching at the youth level.

== International career ==
Buttigieg made his first international appearance with Malta in the group stage of UEFA Euro 1980 qualification, debuting on 25 February 1979 during their incredible 0–0 draw on home soil against eventual champions West Germany. For his performance, the young defender was described as a "constant inspiration to his colleagues" who "rarely put a wrong foot." He made four further appearances in group play, but Malta was eliminated.

He also played during qualifying rounds of the 1982 FIFA World Cup and UEFA Euro 1984. In the latter, their last match was against Spain, who needed to beat them by 11 or more goals to finish above the Netherlands, who had beaten Malta 5–0 four days earlier. Spain had only scored 12 goals in their previous seven matches, but famously defeated Malta 12–1 on 21 December 1983 in Seville to qualify for the final tournament, where they finished as runners-up. This was Buttigieg's final international appearance.

His only goal at the international level came at the 1981 President's Cup, later known as the Korea Cup. Buttigieg scored in the 80th minute against fellow European minnows Liechtenstein to even the score during an eventual 1–1 draw.

== Career statistics ==
=== International ===
National team	Year	Apps	Goals
Malta	1979	5	0
Malta	1980	2	0
Malta	1981	6	1
Malta	1982	2	0
Malta	1983	5	0
Total		20	1

==== International goals ====
Scores and results list Malta's goal tally first.

No.	Date	Venue	Opponent	Score	Result	Competition
1.	14 June 1981	Jeonju World Cup Stadium, Jeonju, South Korea	Liechtenstein	1–1	1–1	1981 President's Cup Football Tournament

== Honours ==
=== Club ===
Hibernians

- Maltese Premier League: 1978–79, 1980–81, 1981–82
- Maltese FA Trophy: 1979–80, 1981–82
- Testaferrata Cup: 1976–77, 1978–79, 1980–81

St. Patrick

- Maltese Second Division: 1988–89

=== Individual ===
- Maltese Player of the Year: 1980
