= Raymond Xuereb =

Maltese footballer

Ray Xuereb
Personal information
- Date of birth: 22 September 1952 (age 74)
- Place of birth: Marsa, Malta
- Position: Forward

Youth career
- Floriana

Senior career*
Years	Team	Apps	(Gls)
1969–1982	Floriana	178	(80)
1982–1986	Ħamrun Spartans	39	(10)
1986-1989	Naxxar Lions		(11+)
1989-1992	Għargħur		(20+)
1993-1995	Naxxar Lions	6+	(1+)
1995-1996	Qrendi	12	(16)

International career
1971–1985	Malta	42	(5)
1973–1984	Malta XI	3	(1)
- * Club domestic league appearances and goals as of 18 July 2009

Raymond Xuereb (born 22 September 1952) is a Maltese retired footballer. He has played for Floriana, Ħamrun Spartans, Naxxar Lions, Għargħur, Qrendi throughout his career. He has also played for the Malta national football team.

== Club career ==
Born in Marsa in 1952, Xuereb made his league debut for Floriana in 1969 against Valletta and scored 80 goals in 178 league games while winning 4 league titles and three domestic cups for them. He later helped Naxxar Lions clinch three successive promotions and is the only player who has scored at all levels of Maltese football. He was named Maltese Player of the Year in 1978.

== International career ==
Xuereb made his debut for Malta in a December 1971 friendly match against Algeria and earned a total of 45 caps (3 unofficial), scoring 6 goals. His final international was an April 1985 World Cup qualification match against Czechoslovakia.

== Personal life ==
Hir brother George and his nephew Aaron also played for the national team.

== Honours ==
Floriana

- Maltese Premier League: 1970, 1973, 1975, 1977
- Maltese FA Trophy: 1972, 1976, 1981

Ħamrun Spartans

- Maltese Premier League: 1983
- Maltese FA Trophy: 1983, 1984

Naxxar Lions

- Maltese First Division: 1988
- Maltese Second Division: 1987
- Maltese Third Division: 1986

Għargħur

- Maltese Second Division: 1991

Qrendi

- Maltese Third Division: 1996
