= Eddie Theobald =

Maltese footballer

Personal information
- Full name: Edward Theobald
- Date of birth: 28 September 1940
- Place of birth: Paola, Malta
- Date of death: 26 March 2010 (aged 69)
- Position: Midfielder

Senior career*
Years	Team	Apps	(Gls)
1958–1974	Hibernians	206	(44)
1974–1977	Żebbuġ Rangers	48	(3)
1977	Naxxar Lions	1	(0)
1977–1978	Msida St-Joseph	7	(1)
Total		262	(48)

International career
1961–1972	Malta	18	(2)

Managerial career
- 1981–1982: Hibernians
- * Club domestic league appearances and goals

Edward "Eddie" Theobald (28 September 1940 – 26 March 2010) was a Maltese footballer who played as a midfielder and made 18 appearances for the Malta national team.

== Career ==
Theobald made his debut for Malta on 18 June 1961 in a friendly match against Italy C, which finished as a 0–3 loss. He went on to make 18 appearances, scoring 2 goals, before making his last appearance on 30 April 1972 in a 1974 FIFA World Cup qualification match against Austria, which finished as a 0–4 loss.

== Personal life ==
His father Turu also played for Hibernians, and his brother Louis earned 4 caps for Malta.

== Career statistics ==
=== International ===
Malta
Year	Apps	Goals
1961	2	0
1962	3	1
1964	1	0
1966	2	0
1969	1	0
1970	3	1
1971	5	0
1972	1	0
Total	18	2

=== International goals ===
No.	Date	Venue	Opponent	Score	Result	Competition
1	28 June 1962	Københavns Idrætspark, Copenhagen, Denmark	Denmark	1–4	1–6	1964 European Nations' Cup qualifying
2	20 December 1970	Empire Stadium, Gżira, Malta	Switzerland	1–1	1–2	UEFA Euro 1972 qualifying

== Honours ==
- Maltese Premier League: 3

1961, 1967, 1969

- FA Trophy: 3

1962, 1970, 1971
