= Andrei Agius =

Maltese footballer (born 1986)

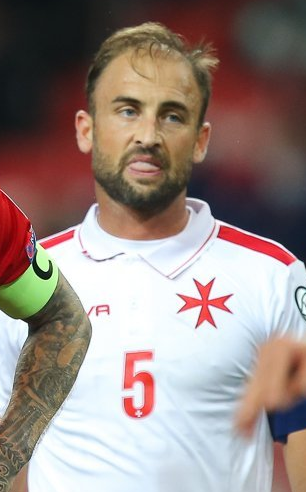
- Agius playing for Malta in 2021

Personal information
- Date of birth: 12 August 1986 (age 40)
- Place of birth: Pietà, Malta
- Height: 1.82 m (6 ft 0 in)
- Position: Central defender

Youth career
- 1995–1999: Santa Lucija
- 1999–2003: Sliema Wanderers
- 2004: Zemun

Senior career*
Years	Team	Apps	(Gls)
2003	Sliema Wanderers	2	(0)
2004	Zemun	0	(0)
2004–2005	Sporting Mascalucia	26	(6)
2005–2007	Messina	28	(2)
2006–2007	→ Martina (loan)	15	(1)
2007–2009	Igea Virtus	68	(3)
2009–2010	Cassino	10	(0)
2010–2011	Melfi	37	(0)
2011	→ Birkirkara (loan)	12	(1)
2011–2013	Latina	35	(0)
2013–2014	Torres	16	(1)
2014	→ Aprilia (loan)	14	(0)
2014–	Hibernians	221	(17)

International career^{‡}
2005–2008	Malta U21	37	(1)
2006–2022	Malta	103	(6)
- * Club domestic league appearances and goals as of 25 June 2023 ‡ National team caps and goals as of 7 June 2021

Andrei Agius (born 12 August 1986) is a Maltese footballer who is currently employed as head coach at Hibernians.

== Club career ==
=== Early career ===
Agius began his career with Santa Lucija, his hometown club, before joining the youth nursery of Sliema Wanderers, the most decorated club in Maltese football.

In July 2003, Agius was part of the Sliema Wanderers under-16 squad that participated in the Nikola Kotkov Tournament, organised by the Academy Lokomotiv 101.

On 19 December 2003, aged only 17, Agius, who started out as a midfielder, made his senior debut for Sliema Wanderers in a Premier League match against Floriana but his determination to pursue a professional career meant that, just weeks after his first senior appearance, the then teenage defender left for his first overseas challenge.

=== Serbia and Montenegro ===
Agius headed to Serbia and Montenegro to join first-division club Zemun on an initial six-month contract but played mostly for Zemun's youth team, scoring two goals in the process.

=== Italy ===
In the summer of 2004, Agius moved to Italy after catching the eye of Sicilian club Sporting Mascalucia who offered him a contract. In his first season with Sport Club Mascalucia, Agius scored three goals and was voted as the most promising midfielder in the Italy's regional championship.

Following another positive season with Mascalucia, Agius secured a contract with then Serie A club Messina, where he became a regular in the reserve squad. In his first season with Messina, Agius switched from midfield to defence.

In February 2006, Agius featured in the Torneo Mondiale di Calcio Coppa Carnevale and scored two goals, one against Pistoiese and the other against Torino. In May 2006, Agius was among the Messina substitutes for the Serie A match against Empoli.

After his initial one-year spell with Messina, Agius was loaned to Serie C side Martina during the August transfer window in 2006. In season 2006–07, Agius faced intense competition for first-team places from experienced and seasoned players but still managed to make some appearances for Martina in the Coppa Italia.

In season 2007–08, Agius moved to Igea Virtus, regarded as the second team of Messina Calcio. In his first season with Igea Virtus, Agius played 34 league matches and one in the Coppa Italia. His performances with Virtus earned him a four-year contract with Messina in March 2008 but the following summer, financial difficulties forced the Serie B club to file for bankruptcy. Agius was freed from his contractual obligations with the club and rejoined Igea Virtus where he was an automatic choice in their first team.

Later on in the 2009–10 season, Agius signed for Serie C team Cassino in a co-ownership deal with Salernitana. In January 2010, Agius was loaned to Melfi, and eventually signed a two-year contract with the club. A year later, it looked as though Agius was going to sign for Serie B side Triestina, and also played for the team in a triangular tournament, but nothing came of it.

In January 2011, Agius joined Maltese Premier League club Birkirkara on a short-term loan deal. On 31 August 2011, Agius signed for Italian side Latina, and was part of the squad that won promotion to Serie B as well as winning the 2012–13 Coppa Italia Lega Pro. US Latina's promotion to the second division of Italian football led to a squad overhaul in the summer of 2013 and Agius opted to join Sardinian club Torres.

=== Return to Malta ===
In the summer of 2014, Agius returned to Malta to join Hibernians, his hometown club. With his current club he won two Maltese Premier League titles (in 2014–15 and 2016–17).

Agius was also in the Hibs team that caused a shock by beating Israel's Maccabi Tel Aviv 2–1 in the first leg of their 2015–16 UEFA Champions League second qualifying round tie at the Hibernians Stadium on 14 July 2015. In 2019, he won the award as Maltese Player of the Year.

== International career ==
Agius earned his first call-up to Malta's under-21 squad, then coached by Mark Miller, in August 2003 for a friendly match against Italy under-21. Agius has represented Malta 37 times at under-21 level. In 2005, he formed part of the Malta under-21 team that participated in the Mediterranean Games, held in Almería, Spain.

In February 2006, Agius, then aged 19, was named in Malta's senior squad for the biennial Malta International football tournament. The other participating nations were Georgia and Moldova.

On 4 June 2021, he played his 100th match for Malta in a 2–1 loss in a friendly match against Kosovo.

== Career statistics ==
#	Country	Season	Club	League	Appearances	Goals
1.	Serbia	2003–04	FK Zemun	Under 18	17	1
2.	Italy	2004–05	FC Mascalucia	Eccellenza	26	6
3.	Italy	2005–06	FC Messina	Primavera	28	2
4.	Italy	2006–07	FC Martina Franca	C1	5	0
5.	Italy	2007–08	FC Igea Virtus	C2	35	1
6.	Italy	2008–09	FC Igea Virtus	C2	33	2
7.	Italy	2009–10	SS Cassino Calcio	C2	10	0
8.	Italy	2010–11	A.S Melfi	C2	17	0
9.	Italy	2011–11	A.S Melfi	C2	14	0
10.	Malta	2011–11	Birkirkara FC Malta	Premier League Malta	14	1
11.	Italy	2011–13	Latina Calcio	C1	36	1
12.	Italy	2013–14	Torres FC Calcio	C2	14	1
13.	Italy	2013–14	Aprilia	C2	16	0
14.	Malta	2014–16	Hibernians	Premier League Malta	85	10

=== International goals ===
Scores and results list Malta's goal tally first.

No	Date	Venue	Opponent	Score	Result	Competition
1.	14 August 2012	San Marino Stadium, Serravalle, San Marino	San Marino	2–1	3–2	Friendly
2.	5 October 2017	Ta' Qali National Stadium, Ta' Qali, Malta	Lithuania	1–0	1–1	2018 FIFA World Cup qualification
3.	29 May 2018	Gernot Langes Stadion, Wattens, Austria	Armenia	1–0	1–1	Friendly
4.	10 September 2018	Ta' Qali National Stadium, Ta' Qali, Malta	Azerbaijan	1–0	1–1	2018–19 UEFA Nations League D
5.	11 October 2018	Fadil Vokrri Stadium, Pristina, Kosovo	Kosovo	1–1	1–3	2018–19 UEFA Nations League D
6.	3 September 2020	Tórsvøllur, Tórshavn, Faroe Islands	Faroe Islands	2–1	2–3	2020–21 UEFA Nations League D

== Honours ==
US Calcio Latina

- Coppa Italia Lega Pro: 2012–13

Hibernians

- Maltese Premier League: 2014–15, 2016–17 2021-22
- Maltese Super Cup: 2015

Individual

- Malta Football Players Association Team of the Year: 2014–15
- Maltese Player of the Year: 2019

== See also ==
- List of men's footballers with 100 or more international caps
