= Louis Theobald =

Maltese footballer (1938–2025)

Personal information
- Date of birth: 20 July 1938
- Place of birth: Paola, Malta
- Date of death: 15 February 2025 (aged 86)
- Position: Defender

Senior career*
Years	Team	Apps	(Gls)
1955–1968	Hibernians		
1968–1970	Birżebbuġa St. Peter's		

International career
1960–1962	Malta	4	(0)
- * Club domestic league appearances and goals

Louis Theobald (20 July 1938 – 15 February 2025) was a Maltese footballer, who spent the majority of his career playing as a defender for Hibernians.

== Club career ==
Born in Paola, Theobald made his debut for hometown club Hibernians in May 1955 against Sliema Wanderers and won one league and one cup title with them. He was voted Maltese Player of the Year in 1960. After a couple of injury-hit seasons, he joined third-tier outfit Birżebbuġa St. Peter's in 1968.

== International career ==
An elegant half-back, Theobald made his debut for Malta in a December 1960 friendly match against Tunisia and earned a total of 4 caps (no goals). His final international was a December 1962 European Championship qualification match against Denmark.

== Personal life and death ==
His father Turu also played for Hibernians, and his brother Eddie earned 18 caps for Malta.

Theobald died on 15 February 2025, at the age of 86.

== Honours ==
Hibernians

- Maltese Premier League: 1961
- Maltese FA Trophy: 1962

Individual

- Maltese Player of the Year: 1960
