= Leonard Farrugia =

Maltese footballer

Nardu Farrugia
Personal information
- Full name: Leonard Farrugia
- Date of birth: 23 November 1956 (age 69)
- Place of birth: Kirkop, Malta
- Position: Striker

Senior career*
Years	Team	Apps	(Gls)
- Kirkop United
1975–1976	→ St George's (loan)	11	(3)
1976–1988	Valletta	159	(90)

International career
1978–1987	Malta	18	(2)

Managerial career
- -2007: Kirkop United
- 2007-: Naxxar Lions
- * Club domestic league appearances and goals

Leonard "Nardu" Farrugia (born 25 November 1956 in Kirkop) is a Maltese retired footballer. He played for Kirkop United, St George's and Valletta. Farrugia was capped eighteen times for the Malta national football team and scored twice.

== Club career ==
Farrugia started playing football for his hometown team Kirkop United. His father Clement founded the club and was its first president. Leonard was loaned to St George's before signing for Valletta in 1976.

=== Valletta ===
Farrugia scored the only goal in the 1976–77 Maltese FA Trophy final against Floriana. He finished top scorer of the league in the 1977–78, 1979–80, and 1984–85 seasons. In 1985 he won the Maltese Player of the Year.

== International career ==
In 1978 Farrugia made his debut for Malta in a 1–0 victory against Tunisia. He scored against Portugal and Sweden.

Farrugia was injured by a tackle from Antonio Cabrini in a January 1987 friendly game against Italy. He missed the rest of the season and was forced to retire after being substituted against Birkirkara the following season.

=== International goals ===
"Score" represents the score in the match after Farrugia's goal.

Goal	Date	Venue	Opponent	Score	Result	Competition
1.	10 February 1985	National Stadium, Ta' Qali	Portugal	1–2	1–3	1986 FIFA World Cup qualification
2.	17 November 1985	National Stadium, Ta' Qali	Sweden	1–1	1–2	1986 FIFA World Cup qualification

== Managerial career ==
Nardu was appointed manager of Naxxar Lions in June 2007.

== Honours and achievements ==
=== Player ===
Valletta

- Premier League: 1977–78, 1979–80, 1983–84
- FA Trophy: 1976–77, 1977–78

=== Individual ===
- Maltese Player of the Year: 1985
