= Mario Muscat =

Maltese football goalkeeper

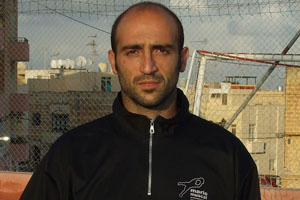

Personal information
- Date of birth: 18 August 1976 (age 50)
- Place of birth: Paola, Malta
- Height: 5 ft 10 in (1.78 m)
- Position: Goalkeeper

Senior career*
Years	Team	Apps	(Gls)
1993–2014	Hibernians	488	(1)
2014	→ Vittoriosa Stars (loan)	12	(0)
2015–2017	Pembroke Athleta	28	(0)

International career^{‡}
1996–2009	Malta	68	(0)

Managerial career
- 2018: Hibernians
- 2018–2019: Qormi
- 2019–2020: Senglea Athletic
- 2020-: Mosta FC
- * Club domestic league appearances and goals as of 2020- ‡ National team caps and goals as of Mosta FC

Mario Muscat (born 18 August 1976) is a Maltese former professional footballer and manager.

Muscat spent almost the entirety of his football career with Hibernians in the Maltese Premier League, and was capped over 68 times for the Maltese national team.

== Playing career ==
=== Hibernians ===
Muscat began his career in the 1993–94 season, when he was called into the first team squad of Hibernians. In his debut season, he helped Hibernians win the Maltese Premier League title, going on to make 18 appearances for the team during the season.

Continuing with Hibernians for the 1994–1995 season, Muscat again won the Maltese Premier League title, making 12 appearances during the season.

In the 1995–1996 season, Muscat went on to record 13 appearances, as Hibernians finished in fourth position in the Maltese Premier League. Despite Muscat failing to win the title with Hibernians for the third time, he was rewarded with a spot within Maltese national football team during the season.

Muscat went into the 1996–1997 season hoping to emulate the form that had seen him called up to the national team. However, Hibernians recorded a disappointing finish in the Maltese Premier League. Muscat went on to make 15 appearances during the season.

The 1997–1998 season saw Muscat maintain his form for Hibernians and the national team. Muscat went on to make 23 appearances, winning the Maltese Player of the Year award, and helped the club win the Maltese Cup.

After several years without a title, Hibernians were crowned champions of the Maltese Premier League for the 2001–02 season, with Muscat as a mainstay of the team.

Muscat would leave the club in 2014 after a period on loan to Vittoriosa Stars, having won in the interim six more titles, including the Maltese Premier League, the Maltese Cup and the Maltese Supercup.

=== Later career and retirement ===
After a two year spell with Pembroke Athleta, also in the Maltese Premier League, Muscat retired in 2017.

== Management career ==
After his retirement, Muscat started his coaching career in his former club, Hibernians, later having spells with Qormi, Senglea Athletic, and his current club, Mosta F.C..

== Career statistics ==
Statistics accurate as of match played 9 August 2009.

Appearances and goals by club, season and competition
Club	Season	League			Maltese Cup		Europe		Other		Total	
Club	Season	Division	Apps	Goals	Apps	Goals	Apps	Goals	Apps	Goals	Apps	Goals
Hibernians	1993–94	Maltese Premier League	18	0	0	0	0	0	0	0	18	0
Hibernians	1994–95	Maltese Premier League	12	0	0	0	0	0	0	0	12	0
Hibernians	1995–96	Maltese Premier League	13	0	0	0	0	0	0	0	13	0
Hibernians	1996–97	Maltese Premier League	15	0	0	0	0	0	0	0	15	0
Hibernians	1997–98	Maltese Premier League	23	0	0	0	0	0	0	0	23	0
Hibernians	1998–99	Maltese Premier League	26	0	0	0	0	0	0	0	26	0
Hibernians	1999–2000	Maltese Premier League	24	0	0	0	0	0	0	0	24	0
Hibernians	2000–01	Maltese Premier League	25	1	0	0	0	0	0	0	25	1
Hibernians	2001–02	Maltese Premier League	26	0	0	0	0	0	0	0	26	0
Hibernians	2002–03	Maltese Premier League	28	0	0	0	0	0	0	0	28	0
Hibernians	2003–04	Maltese Premier League	27	0	0	0	0	0	0	0	27	0
Hibernians	2004–05	Maltese Premier League	27	0	0	0	0	0	0	0	27	0
Hibernians	2005–06	Maltese Premier League	24	0	0	0	0	0	0	0	24	0
Hibernians	2006–07	Maltese Premier League	25	0	0	0	0	0	0	0	25	0
Hibernians	2007–08	Maltese Premier League	19	0	0	0	0	0	0	0	19	0
Hibernians	2008–09	Maltese Premier League	28	0	0	0	0	0	0	0	28	0
Hibernians	2009–10	Maltese Premier League	25	0	0	0	0	0	0	0	25	0
Hibernians	2010–11	Maltese Premier League	22	0	0	0	0	0	0	0	22	0
Hibernians	2011–12	Maltese Premier League	22	0	0	0	0	0	0	0	22	0
Career total			429	1	0	0	0	0	0	0	429	1

== Honors ==
Hibernians

- Maltese Premier League: 1993–94, 1994–95, 2001–02, 2008–09, Maltese premier league 2014/15
- Maltese FA Trophy: 1997–98, 2005–06, 2006–07, 2011–12, 2012–13
- Maltese Super Cup: 1994, 2007

Individual

- Maltese Player of the Year: 1997–98
