= Andrew Cohen (footballer) =

Maltese footballer

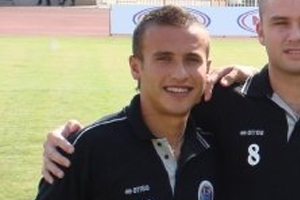
- Cohen in 2009

Personal information
- Full name: Andrew Cohen
- Date of birth: 13 May 1981 (age 45)
- Place of birth: Kalkara, Malta
- Height: 5 ft 5 in (1.65 m)
- Position: Attacking midfielder

Senior career*
| Years | Team | Apps | (Gls) |
| 1999–2017 | Hibernians | 406 | (127) |
| 2017–2021 | Gżira United | 86 | (20) |

International career
| 2004–2018 | Malta | 68 | (1) |

Managerial career
- 2024: Gżira United
- * Club domestic league appearances and goals

Andrew Cohen (born 13 May 1981) is a Maltese former footballer who played as a striker.

== Playing career ==
=== Hibernians ===
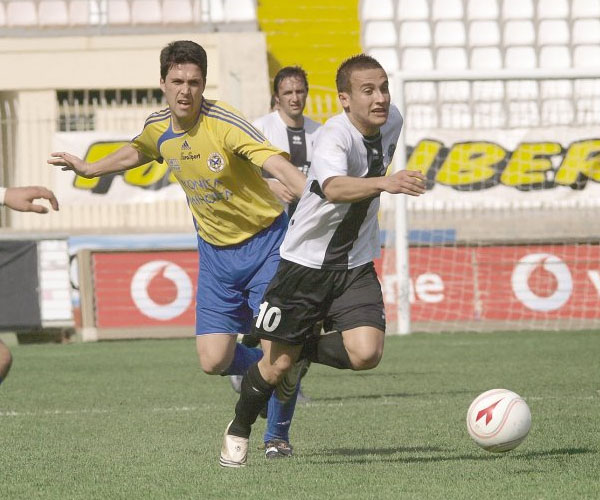
Andrew Cohen battles with Marsaxlokk's defender Brian Said.

Cohen began his career with this boyhood team Hibernians, making the transformation from the youth squad to the senior squad during the 1999–2000 season. He made seven appearances in his debut season, scoring one goal, as Hibernians recorded a sixth-place finish in the Maltese Premier League.

The 2000–01 season saw Cohen firmly establish himself in the Hibernians first team squad, as he helped to a fourth-place finish in the Maltese Premier League, making 19 appearances and scoring three goals. The following season, Hibernians won the league title with Cohen making 19 appearances.

The inclusion of Terence Scerri in the Hibernians first team for the 2003–04 season helped him to uncover his attacking prowess. The pair started to play together regularly, which turned out to be the start of a devastating strike partnership. Hibernians went on to finish third, with Cohen scoring seven goals. Cohen's good form did not go unnoticed as he received his first cap for the Maltese national team, starting in the 3–2 defeat to the Faroe Islands on 18 August 2004.

The 2004–05 season saw Cohen burst onto the goal scoring scene, hitting for the first time double-digit goals, as he finished the league top scorer with 21 goals. This achievement lead him to being crowned as the Maltese Player of the Year for the first time in his career. Cohen's impressive form continued into the 2005–06 season with 14 goals to his name as Hibernians secured a fourth-place finish. He also helped the club win the Maltese Cup, and Cohen scooped for the second consecutive season the Maltese Player of the Year award.

For the 2008–09 season, under the guidance of new manager Mark Miller, the club shocked the critics and beat Valletta by two points to win the Maltese Premier League title. Cohen made 22 appearances and scored nine goals.

=== Gżira United ===
On 31 January 2017, with the transfer window approaching closure, Cohen joined fellow Maltese Premier League side Gżira United on a free transfer, signing a 2 1/2-year deal. The transfer brought down the curtain on a career at Hibernians that had spanned over 16 years playing in Paola, but with playing time becoming less frequent, Cohen made the move to help Gżira United in their battle against relegation. It was also suggested the Maroons completed the deal despite interest from fellow Maltese clubs Sliema Wanderers and Hamrun Spartans.

In his first full season with the club, Gżira surprised the league as they finished third, gaining a place in the qualifying stages of the 2018–19 UEFA Europa League. For his endeavours, Cohen was awarded the Maltese Player of the Year award for a record fourth time.

On 18 January 2024, he became Manager of the club. On 9 November 2024, he resigned as Manager of the Club because they failed to qualify for the top 6 by goal difference when they lost against Ħamrun Spartans 2 days early.

== Honours ==
Hibernians

- Maltese Premier League: 2001–02, 2008–09, 2014–15
- Maltese FA Trophy: 2005–06, 2006–07, 2011–12, 2012–13
- Maltese Super Cup: 2007

Individual

- Maltese Player of the Year: 2004–05, 2005–06, 2014–15, 2017–18

== Career statistics ==
Statistics accurate as of match played September 5, 2014.

Appearances and goals by club, season and competition
| Club | Season | League | | | FA Trophy | | League Decider | | Europe | | Total | |
| Club | Season | Division | Apps | Goals | Apps | Goals | Apps | Goals | Apps | Goals | Apps | Goals |
|---|---|---|---|---|---|---|---|---|---|---|---|---|
| Hibernians | 1999–2000 | Maltese Premier League | 7 | 1 | 0 | 0 | 0 | 0 | 0 | 0 | 7 | 1 |
| Hibernians | 2000–01 | Maltese Premier League | 19 | 3 | 0 | 0 | 0 | 0 | 0 | 0 | 19 | 3 |
| Hibernians | 2001–02 | Maltese Premier League | 19 | 4 | 0 | 0 | 0 | 0 | 0 | 0 | 19 | 4 |
| Hibernians | 2002–03 | Maltese Premier League | 17 | 3 | 0 | 0 | 0 | 0 | 0 | 0 | 17 | 3 |
| Hibernians | 2003–04 | Maltese Premier League | 23 | 7 | 0 | 0 | 0 | 0 | 0 | 0 | 23 | 7 |
| Hibernians | 2004–05 | Maltese Premier League | 27 | 21 | 0 | 0 | 0 | 0 | 0 | 0 | 27 | 21 |
| Hibernians | 2005–06 | Maltese Premier League | 26 | 14 | 0 | 0 | 0 | 0 | 0 | 0 | 26 | 14 |
| Hibernians | 2006–07 | Maltese Premier League | 24 | 8 | 0 | 0 | 0 | 0 | 0 | 0 | 24 | 8 |
| Hibernians | 2007–08 | Maltese Premier League | 23 | 6 | 0 | 0 | 0 | 0 | 0 | 0 | 23 | 6 |
| Hibernians | 2008–09 | Maltese Premier League | 22 | 9 | 0 | 0 | 0 | 0 | 0 | 0 | 22 | 9 |
| Hibernians | 2009–10 | Maltese Premier League | 24 | 6 | 0 | 0 | 0 | 0 | 0 | 0 | 24 | 6 |
| Hibernians | 2010–11 | Maltese Premier League | 24 | 6 | 0 | 0 | 0 | 0 | 0 | 0 | 24 | 6 |
| Hibernians | 2011–12 | Maltese Premier League | 31 | 9 | 0 | 0 | 0 | 0 | 0 | 0 | 31 | 9 |
| Hibernians | 2012–13 | Maltese Premier League | 32 | 8 | 0 | 0 | 1 | 0 | 0 | 0 | 32 | 8 |
| Hibernians | 2013–14 | Maltese Premier League | 29 | 5 | 0 | 0 | 0 | 0 | 0 | 0 | 29 | 5 |
| Hibernians | 2014–15 | Maltese Premier League | 31 | 9 | 5 | 0 | 0 | 0 | 2 | 1 | 38 | 10 |
| Career total | | | 378 | 119 | 5 | 0 | 1 | 0 | 2 | 1 | 386 | 120 |
