= 1965–66 Maltese Premier League =

Maltese First Division
- Season: 1965–66
- Dates: 16th October 1965 - 23rd February 1966.
- Champions: Sliema Wanderers (18th title)
- Relegated: Birkirkara
- European Cup: Sliema Wanderers
- European Cup Winners' Cup: Floriana
- Matches played: 30
- Goals scored: 75 (2.5 per match)
- Top goalscorer: John Bonnet; Ronnie Cocks (6)
- Biggest home win: Sliema Wanderers 4-0 Birkirkara
- Biggest away win: Hamrun Spartans 0-4 Hibernians
- Highest scoring: Birkirkara 2-5 Valletta

The 1965–66 Maltese First Division was the 51st season of top-tier football in Malta.

The season started on 16th October 1965 and ended on 23rd February 1966. It was entirely played on Manoel Island football ground.

It was contested by 6 teams, and Sliema Wanderers F.C. won the championship for the 18th time, the third in a row.

== League standings ==
Pos	Team	Pld	W	D	L	GF	GA	GD	Pts	Qualification
1	Sliema Wanderers F.C. (C)	10	7	3	0	24	7	+17	17	Qualification for the European Cup
2	Floriana F.C.	10	5	1	4	16	11	+5	11	Qualification for the European Cup Winners' Cup (Note: Floriana qualified for the Cup Winners' Cup as Maltese FA Trophy Winners)
3	Hibernians F.C.	10	2	6	2	10	8	+2	10	
4	Valletta F.C.	10	2	5	3	11	13	−2	9	
5	Hamrun Spartans F.C.	10	2	4	4	6	14	−8	8	
6	Birkirkara F.C. (R)	10	0	5	5	8	22	−14	5	Relegation

Source: rsssf.com
(C) Champions; (R) Relegated

== Results ==
Home \ Away	BKR	FRM	HIB	ĦMR	SLM	VLT
Birkirkara	—	0–1	1–1	2–2	1–4	2–5
Floriana	4–1	—	2–1	3–0	2–4	2–0
Hibernians	0–0	1–0	—	0–0	0–2	1–1
Ħamrun Spartans	0–0	1–0	0–4	—	0–2	1–1
Sliema Wanderers	4–0	1–1	2–2	2–0	—	2–0
Valletta	1–1	2–1	0–0	0–2	1–1	—

Legend: Blue = home team win; Yellow = draw; Red = away team win.
