= 1975–76 Maltese Premier League =

Maltese First Division
- Season: 1975–76
- Champions: Sliema Wanderers F.C. (21st title)
- Relegated: Marsa F.C. Birkirkara F.C.
- European Cup: Sliema Wanderers F.C.
- European Cup Winners' Cup: Floriana F.C.
- UEFA Cup: Hibernians F.C.
- Matches played: 91
- Goals scored: 222 (2.44 per match)

The 1975–76 Maltese First Division was the 61st season of top-tier football in Malta. It was contested by 10 teams, and Sliema Wanderers F.C. won the championship.

== League standings ==
Pos	Team	Pld	W	D	L	GF	GA	GD	Pts	Qualification
1	Sliema Wanderers F.C. (C)	18	11	4	3	35	13	+22	26	Qualification for the European Cup
2	Floriana F.C.	18	9	7	2	27	12	+15	25	Qualification for the European Cup Winners' Cup (Note: Floriana qualified for the Cup Winners' Cup as Maltese FA Trophy Winners)
3	Hibernians F.C.	18	7	6	5	17	17	0	20	Qualification for the UEFA Cup
4	Zebbug Rangers	18	7	6	5	20	25	−5	20	
5	Valletta F.C.	18	6	6	6	34	26	+8	18	
6	Msida Saint-Joseph F.C.	18	7	4	7	21	24	−3	18	
7	Senglea Athletics Football Club	18	4	8	6	16	22	−6	16	
8	St. George's F.C.	18	4	6	8	17	25	−8	14	
9	Marsa F.C. (R)	18	3	6	9	20	35	−15	12	Relegation
10	Birkirkara F.C. (R)	18	1	9	8	10	18	−8	11	Relegation

Source: rsssf.com
(C) Champions; (R) Relegated

== Third Place tie-breaker ==
With both Hibernians and Zebbug Rangers level on 20 points, a play-off match was conducted to qualification for the UEFA Cup

Hibernians	3–0	Zebbug Rangers

== Results ==
Home \ Away	BKR	FRN	HIB	MRS	MSD	SNA	SLM	STG	VLT	ZEB
Birkirkara	—	1–3	0–1	1–2	2–0	1–1	1–2	0–0	1–1	1–1
Floriana	0–0	—	0–1	3–1	1–0	0–0	1–2	4–2	3–3	1–0
Hibernians	1–0	0–0	—	1–1	3–1	1–3	0–2	1–0	0–0	1–1
Marsa	0–0	0–0	1–1	—	2–3	0–2	1–4	4–3	0–3	3–4
Msida Saint-Joseph	1–0	1–2	2–3	1–1	—	2–1	0–0	2–0	3–2	1–2
Senglea Athletics	1–1	0–0	0–0	1–2	2–1	—	0–4	0–0	1–3	2–2
Sliema Wanderers	1–1	0–1	1–0	4–1	0–1	1–2	—	1–0	4–1	2–1
St. George's	1–0	2–2	3–0	0–0	0–0	1–0	0–4	—	2–2	2–0
Valletta	2–1	1–3	2–3	3–1	1–2	0–0	1–1	3–1	—	0–1
Żebbuġ Rangers	0–0	0–3	1–0	1–0	1–1	2–0	1–1	2–1	0–6	—

Legend: Blue = home team win; Yellow = draw; Red = away team win.
