= 1970–71 Maltese Premier League =

Annual soccer tournament

Maltese First Division
- Season: 1970–71
- Champions: Sliema Wanderers F.C. (19th title)
- Relegated: no religation
- European Cup: Sliema Wanderers F.C.
- European Cup Winners' Cup: Hibernians F.C.
- UEFA Cup: Marsa F.C.
- Matches played: 57
- Goals scored: 109 (1.91 per match)

The 1970–71 Maltese First Division was the 56th season of top-tier football in Malta. It was contested by 8 teams, and Sliema Wanderers F.C. won the championship.

== League standings ==
Pos	Team	Pld	W	D	L	GF	GA	GD	Pts	Qualification
1	Sliema Wanderers F.C. (C)	14	7	6	1	17	5	+12	20	Qualification for the European Cup
2	Marsa F.C.	14	7	6	1	15	6	+9	20	Qualification for the UEFA Cup
3	Gzira United	14	6	5	3	16	11	+5	17	
4	Hibernians F.C.	14	6	4	4	12	8	+4	16	Qualification for the European Cup Winners' Cup (Note: Hibernians qualified for the Cup Winners' Cup as Maltese FA Trophy Winners)
5	Valletta F.C.	14	6	3	5	11	9	+2	15	
6	Floriana F.C.	14	4	5	5	17	15	+2	13	
7	Qormi F.C.	14	2	2	10	7	23	−16	6	
8	Zebbug Rangers	14	2	1	11	11	29	−18	5	

Source: rsssf.com
(C) Champions

== Championship tie-breaker ==
With both Sliema Wanderers and Marsa level on 20 points, a play-off match was conducted to decide the champion.

Sliema Wanderers F.C.	3–0	Marsa F.C.

== Results ==
Home \ Away	FRN	GŻI	HIB	MRS	QOR	SLM	VLT	ZEB
Floriana	—	0–0	0–0	1–1	2–0	1–1	0–1	1–0
Gżira United	2–4	—	1–0	1–1	1–0	1–0	1–0	2–1
Hibernians	2–1	1–0	—	0–0	0–2	0–2	1–0	3–0
Marsa	2–0	0–0	2–1	—	2–1	0–0	3–0	1–0
Qormi	1–1	0–4	0–2	0–1	—	0–3	0–3	2–3
Sliema Wanderers	3–2	1–1	0–0	1–0	0–0	—	1–0	2–0
Valletta	1–0	1–0	0–0	0–0	1–0	0–0	—	1–2
Żebbuġ Rangers	1–4	2–2	0–2	1–2	0–1	0–3	1–3	—

Legend: Blue = home team win; Yellow = draw; Red = away team win.
