= 1971–72 Maltese Premier League =

Maltese First Division
- Season: 1971–72
- Champions: Sliema Wanderers F.C. (20th title)
- Relegated: Zebbug Rangers; Qormi F.C.
- European Cup: Sliema Wanderers F.C.
- European Cup Winners' Cup: Floriana F.C.
- UEFA Cup: Valletta F.C.
- Matches played: 91
- Goals scored: 157 (1.73 per match)

The 1971–72 Maltese First Division was the 57th season of top-tier football in Malta. It was contested by 10 teams, and Sliema Wanderers F.C. won the championship.

== League standings ==
Pos	Team	Pld	W	D	L	GF	GA	GD	Pts	Qualification
1	Sliema Wanderers F.C. (C)	18	10	6	2	28	7	+21	26	Qualification for the European Cup
2	Floriana F.C.	18	10	6	2	17	7	+10	26	Qualification for the European Cup Winners' Cup (Note: Floriana qualified for the Cup Winners' Cup as Maltese FA Trophy Winners)
3	Valletta F.C.	18	10	4	4	18	13	+5	24	Qualification for the UEFA Cup
4	Hibernians F.C.	18	5	8	5	11	11	0	18	
5	Birkirkara F.C.	18	4	9	5	17	12	+5	17	
6	Gzira United	18	5	7	6	12	12	0	17	
7	Marsa F.C.	18	5	6	7	17	22	−5	16	
8	Hamrun Spartans F.C.	18	4	7	7	13	13	0	15	
9	Zebbug Rangers (R)	18	3	7	8	16	32	−16	13	Relegation
10	Qormi F.C. (R)	18	1	6	11	6	26	−20	8	Relegation

Source: rsssf.com
(C) Champions; (R) Relegated

== Championship tie-breaker ==
With both Sliema Wanderers and Floriana level on 26 points, a play-off match was conducted to decide the champion.

Sliema Wanderers F.C.	2–0	Floriana F.C.

== Results ==
Home \ Away	BKR	FRN	GŻI	HIB	ĦMR	MRS	QOR	SLM	VLT	ZEB
Birkirkara	—	1–2	0–0	1–2	0–0	0–0	2–0	1–1	2–0	6–1
Floriana	2–1	—	1–1	0–0	1–1	2–0	1–0	0–2	0–0	3–0
Gżira United	0–0	0–1	—	0–1	2–0	0–1	2–1	0–0	2–0	1–3
Hibernians	0–1	0–1	1–0	—	1–0	1–1	0–0	0–1	0–1	0–0
Ħamrun Spartans	0–0	1–0	1–2	0–1	—	1–1	3–0	0–0	0–1	3–0
Marsa	2–1	0–1	0–1	1–1	1–0	—	1–1	1–3	2–3	2–1
Qormi	1–0	0–1	0–0	1–1	1–1	0–2	—	0–3	0–2	1–1
Sliema Wanderers	0–0	0–1	0–0	1–0	0–1	1–1	3–0	—	3–0	6–1
Valletta	1–1	0–0	1–0	1–1	1–0	3–0	1–0	0–1	—	1–0
Żebbuġ Rangers	0–0	0–0	1–1	1–1	1–1	2–1	2–0	1–3	1–2	—

Legend: Blue = home team win; Yellow = draw; Red = away team win.
