= 1991–92 Maltese Premier League =

Annual soccer tournament

Maltese Premier League
- Season: 1991–92
- Champions: Valletta F.C. (14th title)
- Relegated: Żurrieq F.C. Mqabba F.C.
- UEFA Champions League: Valletta F.C.
- UEFA Cup: Floriana F.C.
- European Cup Winners' Cup: Hamrun Spartans F.C.
- Matches played: 91
- Goals scored: 275 (3.02 per match)

The 1991–92 Maltese Premier League was the 12th season of the Maltese Premier League, and the 77th season of top-tier football in Malta. It was contested by 10 teams, and Valletta F.C. won the championship.

== Teams ==
Locations of the 1991–92 Maltese Premier League teams

== League standings ==
Pos	Team	Pld	W	D	L	GF	GA	GD	Pts	Qualification
1	Valletta F.C. (C)	18	15	3	0	45	7	+38	33	Qualification for the UEFA Champions League
2	Floriana F.C.	18	10	5	3	26	10	+16	25	Qualification for the UEFA Cup
3	Sliema Wanderers F.C.	18	10	4	4	37	20	+17	24	
4	Hamrun Spartans F.C.	18	10	3	5	52	28	+24	23	Qualification for the European Cup Winners' Cup (Note: Hamrun Spartans qualified for the Cup Winners' Cup as Maltese FA Trophy Winners)
5	Rabat Ajax F.C.	18	6	7	5	31	24	+7	19	
6	Hibernians F.C.	18	5	7	6	19	23	−4	17	
7	Birkirkara F.C.	18	4	8	6	18	26	−8	16	
8	St. Andrews F.C.	18	4	1	13	14	44	−30	9	
9	Żurrieq F.C. (R)	18	2	5	11	20	47	−27	9	Relegation
10	Mqabba F.C. (R)	18	1	3	14	11	44	−33	5	Relegation

Source: rsssf.com
(C) Champions; (R) Relegated

=== Relegation tie-breaker ===
With both St. Andrews and Zurrieq level on 9 points, a play-off match was conducted to determine 9th place and the relegation.

St. Andrews F.C.	2–0	Zurrieq F.C.

== Results ==
Home \ Away	BKR	FRN	HIB	ĦMR	MQB	RBT	SLM	STA	VLT	ŻRQ
Birkirkara	—	2–0	1–1	2–4	0–0	0–0	1–4	2–1	0–2	1–0
Floriana	0–0	—	0–0	1–0	3–0	1–1	0–1	2–0	1–1	2–0
Hibernians	2–1	1–4	—	3–1	1–1	0–0	1–1	3–2	0–5	2–2
Ħamrun Spartans	5–1	0–1	1–0	—	4–2	3–1	3–4	4–0	1–3	5–1
Mqabba	1–1	0–2	0–1	0–5	—	1–5	1–4	0–2	0–5	1–2
Rabat Ajax	1–1	0–2	1–0	3–3	3–0	—	3–1	2–0	1–3	1–1
Sliema Wanderers	0–0	0–1	1–0	1–1	1–0	3–3	—	7–1	0–1	1–0
St. Andrews	0–2	0–4	2–1	0–5	1–0	0–5	1–2	—	0–2	2–0
Valletta	3–1	2–0	0–0	1–1	4–1	2–0	2–1	1–0	—	2–0
Żurrieq	2–2	2–2	0–3	4–6	0–3	3–1	1–5	2–2	0–6	—

Legend: Blue = home team win; Yellow = draw; Red = away team win.
