= 1979–80 Maltese Premier League =

Maltese First Division
- Season: 1979–80
- Champions: Valletta F.C. (11th title)
- Relegated: Zebbug Rangers; Qormi F.C. St. George's F.C.
- European Cup: Valletta F.C.
- European Cup Winners' Cup: Hibernians F.C.
- UEFA Cup: Sliema Wanderers F.C.
- Matches played: 90
- Goals scored: 283 (3.14 per match)

The 1979–80 Maltese First Division was the 65th season of top-tier football in Malta. It was contested by 10 teams, and Valletta F.C. won the championship.

== League standings ==
| Pos | Team | Pld | W | D | L | GF | GA | GD | Pts | Qualification |
|---|---|---|---|---|---|---|---|---|---|---|
| 1 | Valletta F.C. (C) | 18 | 14 | 3 | 1 | 59 | 8 | +51 | 31 | Qualification for the European Cup |
| 2 | Sliema Wanderers F.C. | 18 | 13 | 2 | 3 | 47 | 11 | +36 | 28 | Qualification for the UEFA Cup |
| 3 | Floriana F.C. | 18 | 12 | 4 | 2 | 35 | 6 | +29 | 28 | |
| 4 | Hibernians F.C. | 18 | 11 | 4 | 3 | 46 | 11 | +35 | 26 | Qualification for the European Cup Winners' Cup (Note: Hibernians qualified for the Cup Winners' Cup as Maltese FA Trophy Winners) |
| 5 | Hamrun Spartans F.C. | 18 | 9 | 2 | 7 | 28 | 24 | +4 | 20 | |
| 6 | Birkirkara F.C. | 18 | 6 | 2 | 10 | 23 | 38 | −15 | 14 | |
| 7 | Marsa F.C. | 18 | 6 | 1 | 11 | 14 | 40 | −26 | 13 | |
| 8 | Zebbug Rangers (R) | 18 | 2 | 4 | 12 | 9 | 31 | −22 | 8 | Relegation |
| 9 | Qormi F.C. (R) | 18 | 3 | 1 | 14 | 13 | 65 | −52 | 7 | Relegation |
| 10 | St. George's F.C. (R) | 18 | 1 | 3 | 14 | 9 | 49 | −40 | 5 | Relegation |

Source: rsssf.com
(C) Champions; (R) Relegated

== Results ==
| Home \ Away | BKR | FRN | HIB | ĦMR | MRS | QOR | SLM | STG | VLT | ZEB |
|---|---|---|---|---|---|---|---|---|---|---|
| Birkirkara | — | 1–3 | 0–5 | 5–1 | 0–0 | 4–1 | 0–7 | 0–0 | 0–4 | 1–0 |
| Floriana | 1–0 | — | 0–0 | 0–0 | 2–0 | 1–0 | 1–0 | 3–0 | 1–1 | 0–0 |
| Hibernians | 3–0 | 0–1 | — | 2–2 | 2–1 | 3–0 | 1–1 | 3–0 | 0–1 | 2–1 |
| Ħamrun Spartans | 0–1 | 0–4 | 1–3 | — | 1–0 | 1–0 | 0–1 | 3–1 | 1–4 | 4–0 |
| Marsa | 3–1 | 0–8 | 1–0 | 0–1 | — | 3–0 | 0–7 | 2–0 | 0–4 | 2–0 |
| Qormi | 2–6 | 0–3 | 0–7 | 0–4 | 5–0 | — | 0–5 | 0–1 | 0–11 | 1–0 |
| Sliema Wanderers | 2–1 | 2–1 | 0–2 | 3–1 | 1–0 | 8–0 | — | 3–0 | 0–2 | 1–0 |
| St. George's | 0–1 | 1–5 | 0–9 | 0–3 | 1–2 | 1–3 | 1–3 | — | 0–2 | 1–1 |
| Valletta | 3–1 | 1–0 | 1–1 | 0–2 | 6–0 | 7–1 | 0–0 | 5–1 | — | 4–0 |
| Żebbuġ Rangers | 3–1 | 0–1 | 1–3 | 0–3 | 1–0 | 0–0 | 1–3 | 1–1 | 0–3 | — |

Legend: Blue = home team win; Yellow = draw; Red = away team win.
