= 1989–90 Maltese Premier League =

Annual soccer tournament

Maltese Premier League
- Season: 1989–90
- Champions: Valletta F.C. (13th title)
- Relegated: Tarxien Rainbows F.C. Zebbug Rangers
- European Cup: Valletta F.C.
- European Cup Winners' Cup: Sliema Wanderers F.C.
- UEFA Cup: Hibernians F.C.
- Matches played: 73
- Goals scored: 206 (2.82 per match)

The 1989–90 Maltese Premier League was the 10th season of the Maltese Premier League, and the 75th season of top-tier football in Malta. It was contested by 9 teams, and Valletta F.C. won the championship.

== Teams ==
Locations of the 1989–90 Maltese Premier League teams

== League standings ==
Pos	Team	Pld	W	D	L	GF	GA	GD	Pts	Qualification
1	Valletta F.C. (C)	16	13	2	1	31	6	+25	26 (Note: 2 points deducted.)	Qualification for the European Cup
2	Sliema Wanderers F.C.	16	11	2	3	36	11	+25	24	Qualification for the European Cup Winners' Cup (Note: Sliema Wanderers qualified for the Cup Winners' Cup as Maltese FA Trophy Winners)
3	Hibernians F.C.	16	10	3	3	30	12	+18	23	Qualification for the UEFA Cup
4	Ħamrun Spartans F.C.	16	10	3	3	37	13	+24	23	
5	Floriana F.C.	16	8	1	7	24	17	+7	17	
6	Naxxar Lions	16	2	7	7	17	27	−10	11	
7	Żurrieq F.C.	16	3	5	8	15	30	−15	11	
8	Tarxien Rainbows F.C. (R)	16	1	2	13	9	40	−31	4	Relegation
9	Zebbug Rangers (R)	16	1	1	14	6	49	−43	3	Relegation

Source: rsssf.com
(C) Champions; (R) Relegated

== Third Place tie-breaker ==
With both Hibernians and Hamrun Spartans level on 23 points, a play-off match was conducted to qualification for the UEFA Cup

Hibernians F.C.	1–0	Hamrun Spartans F.C.

== Results ==
Home \ Away	FRN	HIB	ĦMR	NXR	SLM	TRX	VLT	ZEB	ŻRQ
Floriana	—	2–0	1–2	1–1	1–3	2–0	0–1	4–0	3–1
Hibernians	3–1	—	1–0	3–2	1–0	1–0	0–0	7–0	3–1
Ħamrun Spartans	1–0	0–0	—	3–2	1–1	3–0	2–1	10–0	2–0
Naxxar Lions	1–2	0–5	1–3	—	1–1	0–0	1–1	1–1	1–1
Sliema Wanderers	3–1	3–1	2–1	4–0	—	4–0	0–1	1–0	5–0
Tarxien Rainbows	0–2	0–2	2–4	0–3	1–2	—	0–5	2–0	2–2
Valletta	1–0	2–1	1–0	2–0	1–0	3–1	—	5–0	4–0
Żebbuġ Rangers	0–3	1–2	0–4	0–3	1–2	2–0	0–1	—	1–2
Żurrieq	0–1	0–0	1–1	0–0	0–4	4–1	1–2	2–0	—

Legend: Blue = home team win; Yellow = draw; Red = away team win.
