= 1980–81 Maltese Premier League =

Maltese Premier League
- Season: 1980–81
- Champions: Hibernians F.C. (5th title)
- Relegated: Birkirkara F.C. Marsa F.C.
- European Cup: Hibernians F.C.
- European Cup Winners' Cup: Floriana F.C.
- UEFA Cup: Sliema Wanderers F.C.
- Matches played: 56
- Goals scored: 151 (2.7 per match)

The 1980–81 Maltese Premier League was the 1st season of the Maltese Premier League, and the 66th season of top-tier football in Malta. It was contested by 8 teams, and Hibernians F.C. won the championship.

== Teams ==
Locations of the 1980–81 Maltese Premier League teams

== League standings ==
| Pos | Team | Pld | W | D | L | GF | GA | GD | Pts | Qualification |
|---|---|---|---|---|---|---|---|---|---|---|
| 1 | Hibernians F.C. (C) | 14 | 12 | 2 | 0 | 34 | 10 | +24 | 26 | Qualification for the European Cup |
| 2 | Sliema Wanderers F.C. | 14 | 10 | 3 | 1 | 27 | 8 | +19 | 23 | Qualification for the UEFA Cup |
| 3 | Ħamrun Spartans F.C. | 14 | 7 | 1 | 6 | 19 | 16 | +3 | 15 | |
| 4 | Floriana F.C. | 14 | 5 | 5 | 4 | 17 | 13 | +4 | 15 | Qualification for the European Cup Winners' Cup (Note: Floriana qualified for the Cup Winners' Cup as Maltese FA Trophy Winners) |
| 5 | Valletta F.C. | 14 | 6 | 1 | 7 | 25 | 17 | +8 | 13 | |
| 6 | Żurrieq F.C. | 14 | 4 | 4 | 6 | 15 | 17 | −2 | 12 | |
| 7 | Birkirkara F.C. (R) | 14 | 1 | 3 | 10 | 9 | 35 | −26 | 5 | Relegation |
| 8 | Marsa F.C. (R) | 14 | 1 | 1 | 12 | 5 | 35 | −30 | 3 | Relegation |

Source: rsssf.com
(C) Champions; (R) Relegated

== Results ==
| Home \ Away | BKR | FRN | HIB | ĦMR | MRS | SLM | VLT | ŻRQ |
|---|---|---|---|---|---|---|---|---|
| Birkirkara | — | 0–3 | 0–4 | 1–4 | 0–1 | 0–3 | 0–2 | 0–6 |
| Floriana | 1–1 | — | 0–1 | 1–0 | 4–1 | 1–1 | 2–1 | 0–0 |
| Hibernians | 2–1 | 0–0 | — | 2–1 | 6–2 | 1–1 | 2–1 | 2–0 |
| Ħamrun Spartans | 2–0 | 3–1 | 1–2 | — | 1–0 | 0–1 | 1–1 | 3–2 |
| Marsa | 0–2 | 0–4 | 0–2 | 0–1 | — | 0–2 | 1–6 | 0–2 |
| Sliema Wanderers | 5–1 | 3–0 | 1–2 | 4–1 | 1–0 | — | 1–0 | 1–1 |
| Valletta | 2–1 | 2–0 | 2–3 | 0–1 | 4–0 | 1–2 | — | 0–1 |
| Żurrieq | 0–2 | 0–0 | 0–5 | 1–0 | 0–0 | 0–1 | 2–3 | — |

Legend: Blue = home team win; Yellow = draw; Red = away team win.
