= 1978–79 Maltese Premier League =

Maltese First Division
- Season: 1978–79
- Champions: Hibernians F.C. (4th title)
- Relegated: Ghaxaq F.C. Msida Saint-Joseph F.C.
- European Cup: Hibernians F.C.
- European Cup Winners' Cup: Sliema Wanderers F.C.
- UEFA Cup: Valletta F.C.
- Matches played: 82
- Goals scored: 222 (2.71 per match)

The 1978–79 Maltese First Division was the 64th season of top-tier football in Malta. It was contested by 10 teams, and Hibernians F.C. won the championship.

== Group A ==
| Pos | Team | Pld | W | D | L | GF | GA | GD | Pts | Qualification | SLM | HIB | MRS | ĦMR | QOR |
|---|---|---|---|---|---|---|---|---|---|---|---|---|---|---|---|
| 1 | Sliema Wanderers F.C. | 8 | 7 | 0 | 1 | 16 | 5 | +11 | 14 | Qualification for the Championship group | — | 0–1 | 2–1 | 2–0 | 3–2 |
| 2 | Hibernians F.C. | 8 | 5 | 1 | 2 | 11 | 6 | +5 | 11 | Qualification for the Championship group | 1–2 | — | 2–1 | 1–0 | 2–1 |
| 3 | Marsa F.C. | 8 | 3 | 2 | 3 | 8 | 8 | 0 | 8 | Qualification for the Relegation group | 0–1 | 2–1 | — | 1–0 | 2–1 |
| 4 | Hamrun Spartans F.C. | 8 | 1 | 2 | 5 | 4 | 13 | −9 | 4 | Qualification for the Relegation group | 0–5 | 0–0 | 1–1 | — | 0–1 |
| 5 | Qormi F.C. | 8 | 1 | 1 | 6 | 7 | 14 | −7 | 3 | Qualification for the Relegation group | 0–1 | 0–3 | 0–0 | 2–3 | — |

Source: rsssf.com

== Group B ==
| Pos | Team | Pld | W | D | L | GF | GA | GD | Pts | Qualification | VLT | FRN | STG | GĦX | MSD |
|---|---|---|---|---|---|---|---|---|---|---|---|---|---|---|---|
| 1 | Valletta F.C. | 8 | 6 | 2 | 0 | 18 | 3 | +15 | 14 | Qualification for the Championship group | — | 0–0 | 5–1 | 2–1 | 1–0 |
| 2 | Floriana F.C. | 8 | 6 | 2 | 0 | 17 | 2 | +15 | 14 | Qualification for the Championship group | 0–0 | — | 3–0 | 2–0 | 3–0 |
| 3 | St. George's F.C. | 8 | 2 | 2 | 4 | 9 | 15 | −6 | 6 | Qualification for the Relegation group | 1–3 | 1–2 | — | 1–1 | 2–0 |
| 4 | Ghaxaq F.C. | 8 | 1 | 1 | 6 | 8 | 18 | −10 | 3 | Qualification for the Relegation group | 0–4 | 1–4 | 1–2 | — | 5–0 |
| 5 | Msida Saint-Joseph F.C. | 8 | 1 | 1 | 6 | 4 | 18 | −14 | 3 | Qualification for the Relegation group | 0–3 | 0–5 | 0–0 | 3–0 | — |

Source: rsssf.com

== Championship group ==
| Pos | Team | Pld | W | D | L | GF | GA | GD | Pts | Qualification | HIB | VLT | SLM | FRN |
|---|---|---|---|---|---|---|---|---|---|---|---|---|---|---|
| 1 | Hibernians F.C. (C) | 6 | 5 | 1 | 0 | 12 | 5 | +7 | 11 | Qualification for the European Cup | — | 2–1 | 2–1 | 4–1 |
| 2 | Valletta F.C. | 6 | 2 | 2 | 2 | 7 | 6 | +1 | 6 | Qualification for the UEFA Cup | 1–1 | — | 1–2 | 2–0 |
| 3 | Sliema Wanderers F.C. | 6 | 2 | 0 | 4 | 7 | 9 | −2 | 4 | Qualification for the European Cup Winners' Cup (Note: Sliema Wanderers qualified for the Cup Winners' Cup as Maltese FA Trophy Winners) | 1–2 | 0–1 | — | 1–2 |
| 4 | Floriana F.C. | 6 | 1 | 1 | 4 | 5 | 11 | −6 | 3 | | 0–1 | 1–1 | 1–2 | — |

Source: rsssf.com
(C) Champions

== Relegation group ==
| Pos | Team | Pld | W | D | L | GF | GA | GD | Pts | Qualification | ĦMR | MRS | STG | QOR | GĦX | MSD |
|---|---|---|---|---|---|---|---|---|---|---|---|---|---|---|---|---|
| 5 | Hamrun Spartans F.C. | 10 | 8 | 2 | 0 | 23 | 4 | +19 | 19 | | — | 1–0 | 4–1 | 2–2 | 2–0 | 2–0 |
| 6 | Marsa F.C. | 10 | 5 | 3 | 2 | 22 | 8 | +14 | 15 | | 0–0 | — | 2–3 | 2–2 | 5–0 | 2–1 |
| 7 | St. George's F.C. | 10 | 4 | 1 | 5 | 13 | 20 | −7 | 11 | | 0–2 | 0–3 | — | 1–1 | 2–1 | 3–1 |
| 8 | Qormi F.C. | 10 | 3 | 4 | 3 | 17 | 13 | +4 | 10 | | 0–4 | 0–0 | 4–0 | — | 2–0 | 1–2 |
| 9 | Ghaxaq F.C. (R) | 10 | 3 | 1 | 6 | 9 | 19 | −10 | 8 | Relegation | 0–2 | 1–4 | 2–1 | 2–1 | — | 0–0 |
| 10 | Msida Saint-Joseph F.C. (R) | 10 | 1 | 1 | 8 | 5 | 25 | −20 | 3 | Relegation | 1–4 | 0–4 | 1–4 | 0–4 | 0–3 | — |

Source: rsssf.com
(R) Relegated
