= 1956–57 Maltese Premier League =

Maltese First Division
- Season: 1956–57
- Champions: Sliema Wanderers F.C. (15th title)
- Relegated: Marsa F.C.
- Matches played: 56
- Goals scored: 181 (3.23 per match)

The 1956–57 Maltese First Division was the 42nd season of top-tier football in Malta. It was contested by 8 teams, and Sliema Wanderers F.C. won the championship.

== League standings ==
Pos	Team	Pld	W	D	L	GF	GA	GD	Pts	Qualification
1	Sliema Wanderers F.C. (C)	14	12	2	0	43	6	+37	26	Champions
2	Valletta F.C.	14	9	2	3	29	15	+14	20	
3	Floriana F.C.	14	9	1	4	31	17	+14	19	
4	Hamrun Spartans F.C.	14	5	3	6	14	16	−2	13	
5	Rabat	14	4	2	8	17	34	−17	10	
6	Birkirkara F.C.	14	2	5	7	17	26	−9	9	
7	Hibernians F.C.	14	3	3	8	13	21	−8	9	
8	Marsa F.C. (R)	14	1	4	9	14	43	−29	6	Relegation

Source: rsssf.com
(C) Champions; (R) Relegated

== Results ==
Home \ Away	BKR	FRN	HIB	ĦMR	MRS	RBT	SLM	VLT
Birkirkara	—	1–5	0–1	2–1	2–2	2–2	1–3	1–3
Floriana	1–1	—	3–1	1–0	5–1	2–1	0–1	1–2
Hibernians	1–0	0–1	—	2–2	3–3	5–0	0–2	0–2
Ħamrun Spartans	1–1	3–0	1–0	—	3–0	1–0	0–0	0–1
Marsa	0–0	1–6	2–2	0–2	—	0–1	0–10	1–0
Rabat	1–1	1–2	2–1	4–0	3–2	—	1–7	1–6
Sliema Wanderers	4–2	2–0	2–0	3–0	3–1	3–0	—	2–0
Valletta	3–3	2–4	2–0	2–0	3–1	2–0	1–1	—

Legend: Blue = home team win; Yellow = draw; Red = away team win.
