= 1967–68 Maltese Premier League =

Maltese First Division
- Season: 1967–68
- Champions: Floriana F.C. (20th title)
- Relegated: Msida Saint-Joseph F.C. Qormi F.C.
- European Cup: Floriana F.C.
- European Cup Winners' Cup: Sliema Wanderers F.C.
- Inter-Cities Fairs Cup: Hibernians F.C.
- Matches played: 56
- Goals scored: 141 (2.52 per match)

The 1967–68 Maltese First Division was the 53rd season of top-tier football in Malta. It was contested by 8 teams, and Floriana F.C. won the championship.

== League standings ==
Pos	Team	Pld	W	D	L	GF	GA	GD	Pts	Qualification
1	Floriana F.C. (C)	14	11	3	0	25	3	+22	25	Qualification for the European Cup
2	Sliema Wanderers F.C.	14	9	2	3	36	11	+25	20	Qualification for the European Cup Winners' Cup (Note: Sliema Wanderers qualified for the Cup Winners' Cup as Maltese FA Trophy Winners)
3	Hibernians F.C.	14	8	2	4	17	8	+9	18	Qualification for the Inter-Cities Fairs Cup
4	Valletta F.C.	14	6	1	7	14	16	−2	13	
5	Hamrun Spartans F.C.	14	4	4	6	15	24	−9	12	
6	St. George's F.C.	14	3	4	7	13	25	−12	10	
7	Msida Saint-Joseph F.C. (R)	14	4	0	10	11	23	−12	8	Relegation
8	Qormi F.C. (R)	14	2	2	10	10	31	−21	6	Relegation

Source: rsssf.com
(C) Champions; (R) Relegated

== Results ==
Home \ Away	FRN	HIB	ĦMR	MSD	QOR	SLM	STG	VLT
Floriana	—	1–0	1–0	3–0	1–0	2–0	1–1	3–1
Hibernians	1–1	—	2–0	1–0	1–0	2–0	1–0	1–2
Ħamrun Spartans	0–1	0–3	—	1–0	4–1	0–7	2–2	0–4
Msida Saint-Joseph	0–4	0–1	0–4	—	4–1	1–2	0–1	1–0
Qormi	0–4	2–1	0–0	2–1	—	0–3	2–3	0–1
Sliema Wanderers	0–1	1–1	2–2	3–1	5–0	—	2–1	3–0
St. George's	0–2	0–2	1–1	0–2	2–2	0–4	—	1–4
Valletta	0–0	1–0	0–1	0–1	1–0	0–4	0–1	—

Legend: Blue = home team win; Yellow = draw; Red = away team win.
