= Nicky Saliba =

Maltese footballer

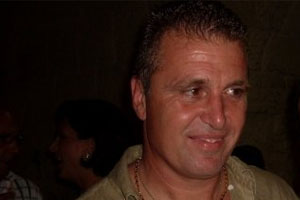

Personal information
- Full name: Nicholas Saliba
- Date of birth: 26 August 1966 (age 60)
- Place of birth: Birkirkara, Malta
- Position: Midfielder

Youth career
- Msida Rangers

Senior career*
Years	Team	Apps	(Gls)
1986–1987	Msida Saint-Joseph	41	(12)
1987–2003	Valletta	287	(21)

International career^{‡}
- Malta U21
1988–2003	Malta	68	(4)

Managerial career
- –2010: Valletta (team manager)
- * Club domestic league appearances and goals as of 21 December 2009 ‡ National team caps and goals as of 21 December 2009

Nicholas Saliba (born 26 August 1966 in Malta) is a former professional footballer who played almost his whole career with Maltese Premier League side Valletta, where he played as a midfielder.

== Career statistics ==
=== International goals ===
#	Date	Venue	Opponent	Score	Result	Competition
1.	26 May 1992	National Stadium, Ta' Qali, Malta	Latvia	1–0	Win	Friendly
2.	19 April 1994	National Stadium, Ta' Qali, Malta	Azerbaijan	5–0	Win	Friendly
3.	16 August 1995	National Stadium, Ta' Qali, Malta	Albania	2–1	Win	Friendly
4.	8 June 1999	Toumba Stadium, Thessaloniki, Greece	FR Yugoslavia	4–1	Loss	Euro 2000 qualifying
Correct as of 13 January 2017

== Honours ==
Valletta

- 1989/90, 1991/92, 1996/97, 1997/98, 1998/99, 2000/01 Maltese Premier League
