= 1957–58 Maltese Premier League =

Maltese First Division
- Season: 1957–58
- Champions: Floriana F.C. (18th title)
- Relegated: St. George's F.C.
- Matches played: 56
- Goals scored: 173 (3.09 per match)

The 1957–58 Maltese First Division was the 43rd season of top-tier football in Malta. It was contested by 8 teams, and Floriana F.C. won the championship.

== League standings ==
Pos	Team	Pld	W	D	L	GF	GA	GD	Pts	Qualification
1	Floriana F.C. (C)	14	12	0	2	43	7	+36	24	Champions
2	Sliema Wanderers F.C.	14	10	1	3	32	11	+21	21	
3	Hamrun Spartans F.C.	14	9	1	4	18	15	+3	19	
4	Valletta F.C.	14	6	3	5	23	18	+5	15	
5	Hibernians F.C.	14	5	2	7	16	26	−10	12	
6	Birkirkara F.C.	14	4	1	9	14	31	−17	9	
7	Rabat	14	3	2	9	16	32	−16	8	
8	St. George's F.C. (R)	14	1	2	11	11	33	−22	4	Relegation

Source: rsssf.com
(C) Champions; (R) Relegated

== Results ==
Home \ Away	BKR	FRN	HIB	ĦMR	RBT	SLM	STG	VLT
Birkirkara	—	0–5	1–3	2–4	2–1	0–5	2–0	2–4
Floriana	2–0	—	1–0	0–1	4–2	1–0	9–1	3–1
Hibernians	1–1	0–6	—	1–1	1–0	0–4	2–1	2–1
Ħamrun Spartans	0–1	1–0	1–0	—	2–1	0–3	2–1	1–0
Rabat	0–2	0–6	3–2	3–1	—	2–4	2–0	1–1
Sliema Wanderers	2–1	0–2	3–0	1–2	2–0	—	2–1	4–1
St. George's	2–0	1–3	1–4	0–1	1–1	0–1	—	0–2
Valletta	2–0	0–1	2–0	2–1	4–0	1–1	2–2	—

Legend: Blue = home team win; Yellow = draw; Red = away team win.
