= 1958–59 Maltese Premier League =

Football league season

Maltese First Division
- Season: 1958–59
- Champions: Valletta F.C. (6th title)
- Relegated: Rabat
- Matches played: 56
- Goals scored: 194 (3.46 per match)

The 1958–59 Maltese First Division was the 44th season of top-tier football in Malta. It was contested by 8 teams, and Valletta F.C. won the championship.

== League standings ==
Pos	Team	Pld	W	D	L	GF	GA	GD	Pts	Qualification
1	Valletta F.C. (C)	14	10	3	1	39	11	+28	23	Champions
2	Sliema Wanderers F.C.	14	9	0	5	31	21	+10	18	
3	Hamrun Spartans F.C.	14	7	1	6	30	26	+4	15	
4	Floriana F.C.	14	5	2	7	21	26	−5	12	
5	Hibernians F.C.	14	5	2	7	15	22	−7	12	
6	Birkirkara F.C.	14	5	2	7	22	30	−8	12	
7	Marsa F.C.	14	4	4	6	17	25	−8	12	
8	Rabat (R)	14	3	2	9	19	33	−14	8	Relegation

Source: rsssf.com
(C) Champions; (R) Relegated

== Results ==
Home \ Away	BKR	FRN	HIB	ĦMR	MRS	RBT	SLM	VLT
Birkirkara	—	2–0	1–3	1–5	1–1	2–1	2–1	0–5
Floriana	3–1	—	2–1	0–2	1–2	2–1	0–3	2–3
Hibernians	0–2	2–0	—	2–1	2–0	3–0	1–5	0–2
Ħamrun Spartans	1–1	3–2	6–0	—	2–1	1–3	1–2	2–9
Marsa	1–6	1–1	0–0	2–1	—	4–1	2–0	1–3
Rabat	4–2	2–4	1–1	1–3	2–0	—	1–3	1–4
Sliema Wanderers	3–1	2–3	1–0	2–0	4–1	4–1	—	1–5
Valletta	2–0	1–1	1–0	0–2	1–1	0–0	3–0	—

Legend: Blue = home team win; Yellow = draw; Red = away team win.
