= 1955–56 Maltese Premier League =

Maltese First Division
- Season: 1955–56
- Champions: Sliema Wanderers F.C. (14th title)
- Relegated: Vittoriosa Stars F.C.
- Matches played: 56
- Goals scored: 167 (2.98 per match)

The 1955–56 Maltese First Division was the 41st season of top-tier football in Malta. It was contested by 8 teams, and Sliema Wanderers F.C. won the championship.

== League standings ==
Pos	Team	Pld	W	D	L	GF	GA	GD	Pts	Qualification
1	Sliema Wanderers F.C. (C)	14	12	0	2	48	12	+36	24	Champions
2	Floriana F.C.	14	8	3	3	30	15	+15	19	
3	Hamrun Spartans F.C.	14	5	4	5	19	19	0	14	
4	Birkirkara F.C.	14	4	5	5	16	22	−6	13	
5	Hibernians F.C.	14	5	3	6	13	23	−10	13	
6	Valletta F.C.	14	3	5	6	14	25	−11	11	
7	Rabat	14	2	6	6	16	25	−9	10	
8	Vittoriosa Stars F.C. (R)	14	3	2	9	11	26	−15	8	Relegation

Source: rsssf.com
(C) Champions; (R) Relegated

== Results ==
Home \ Away	BKR	FRN	HIB	ĦMR	RBT	SLM	VLT	VTS
Birkirkara	—	2–2	1–0	1–1	0–2	2–5	2–2	0–2
Floriana	1–1	—	0–2	3–2	1–1	3–2	0–1	3–1
Hibernians	1–2	0–5	—	0–0	1–1	0–5	1–1	1–0
Ħamrun Spartans	2–1	1–2	1–0	—	1–1	1–3	1–0	3–1
Rabat	1–1	0–6	0–2	3–0	—	1–2	2–2	1–3
Sliema Wanderers	2–1	1–0	5–0	3–1	3–1	—	1–2	6–0
Valletta	0–2	0–2	2–3	1–3	1–1	0–7	—	2–0
Vittoriosa Stars	0–1	1–2	0–2	1–1	2–1	0–3	0–0	—

Legend: Blue = home team win; Yellow = draw; Red = away team win.
