= 1983–84 Maltese Premier League =

Maltese Premier League
- Season: 1983–84
- Champions: Valletta F.C. (12th title)
- Relegated: Żabbar St. Patrick F.C. Birkirkara F.C.
- European Cup: Valletta F.C.
- European Cup Winners' Cup: Hamrun Spartans F.C.
- UEFA Cup: Rabat Ajax F.C.
- Matches played: 52
- Goals scored: 181 (3.48 per match)

The 1983–84 Maltese Premier League was the 4th season of the Maltese Premier League, and the 69th season of top-tier football in Malta. It was contested by 8 teams, and Valletta F.C. won the championship.

== Teams ==
Locations of the 1983–84 Maltese Premier League teams

== First stage ==
Pos	Team	Pld	W	D	L	GF	GA	GD	Pts	Qualification
1	Valletta F.C.	7	4	2	1	8	3	+5	10	Qualification for the Championship Group
2	Ħamrun Spartans F.C.	7	3	3	1	9	5	+4	9	Qualification for the Championship Group
3	Hibernians F.C.	7	3	3	1	7	5	+2	9	Qualification for the Championship Group
4	Rabat Ajax F.C.	7	2	4	1	8	5	+3	8	Qualification for the Championship Group
5	Żurrieq F.C.	7	1	6	0	4	2	+2	8	Qualification for the Relegation Group
6	Floriana F.C.	7	2	3	2	6	7	−1	7	Qualification for the Relegation Group
7	Żabbar St. Patrick F.C.	7	1	1	5	2	11	−9	3	Qualification for the Relegation Group
8	Birkirkara F.C.	7	0	2	5	0	6	−6	2	Qualification for the Relegation Group

Source: rsssf.com

=== Results ===
Home \ Away	VLT	ĦMR	HIB	RBT	ŻRQ	FRN	ZAB	BKR
Valletta	—	2–0	2–3	1–0	0–0	2–0	1–0	0–0
Ħamrun Spartans	—	—	0–0	1–1	1–1	2–1	4–0	1–0
Hibernians	—	—	—	0–0	0–0	1–2	2–1	1–0
Rabat Ajax	—	—	—	—	1–1	2–2	2–0	2–0
Żurrieq	—	—	—	—	—	0–0	2–0	0–0
Floriana	—	—	—	—	—	—	0–0	1–0
Żabbar St. Patrick	—	—	—	—	—	—	—	1–0
Birkirkara	—	—	—	—	—	—	—	—

== Second stage ==
=== Championship group ===
Pos	Team	Pld	W	D	L	GF	GA	GD	Pts	Qualification	VLT	RBT	ĦMR	HIB
1	Valletta F.C.	9	5	2	2	9	6	+3	11 (Note: 1 point deducted.)	Qualification for the European Cup	—	0–0	0–0	1–0
2	Rabat Ajax F.C.	9	3	4	2	5	3	+2	10	Qualification for the UEFA Cup	2–0	—	0–1	1–0
3	Hamrun Spartans F.C.	9	3	3	3	7	6	+1	9	Qualification for the European Cup Winners' Cup (Note: Hamrun Spartans qualified for the Cup Winners' Cup as Maltese FA Trophy Winners)	0–1	0–1	—	3–0
4	Hibernians F.C.	9	1	3	5	5	11	−6	5		1–2	0–0	1–2	—

Source: rsssf.com

=== Relegation group ===
Pos	Team	Pld	W	D	L	GF	GA	GD	Pts	Qualification	ŻRQ	FRN	ZAB	BKR
5	Żurrieq F.C.	9	6	2	1	11	2	+9	14		—	1–0	0–1	1–0
6	Floriana F.C.	9	4	2	3	6	3	+3	10		0–1	—	2–0	2–0
7	Żabbar St. Patrick F.C. (R)	0	0	0	0	0	0	0	0	Relegation	1–4	0–1	—	1–1
8	Birkirkara F.C. (R)	9	1	3	5	3	9	−6	5	Relegation	0–2	1–0	1–1	—

Source: rsssf.com
(R) Relegated
