= 1959–60 Maltese Premier League =

Maltese First Division
- Season: 1959–60
- Champions: Valletta F.C. (7th title)
- Relegated: Birkirkara F.C.
- Matches played: 56
- Goals scored: 183 (3.27 per match)

The 1959–60 Maltese First Division was the 45th season of top-tier football in Malta. It was contested by 8 teams, and Valletta F.C. won the championship.

== League standings ==
Pos	Team	Pld	W	D	L	GF	GA	GD	Pts	Qualification
1	Valletta F.C. (C)	14	11	2	1	40	8	+32	24	Champions
2	Hibernians F.C.	14	9	2	3	31	9	+22	20	
3	Floriana F.C.	14	5	6	3	25	15	+10	16	
4	St. George's F.C.	14	6	3	5	25	26	−1	15	
5	Sliema Wanderers F.C.	14	5	5	4	19	20	−1	15	
6	Marsa F.C.	14	2	5	7	17	42	−25	9	
7	Hamrun Spartans F.C.	14	0	7	7	15	31	−16	7	
8	Birkirkara F.C. (R)	14	2	2	10	11	32	−21	6	Relegation

Source: rsssf.com
(C) Champions; (R) Relegated

== Results ==
Home \ Away	BKR	FRN	HIB	ĦMR	MRS	SLM	STG	VLT
Birkirkara	—	0–1	0–2	1–1	0–3	0–2	0–2	0–4
Floriana	3–2	—	0–1	1–0	2–2	0–0	0–0	0–1
Hibernians	4–1	0–0	—	2–1	1–1	1–2	3–0	1–2
Ħamrun Spartans	1–3	1–6	0–4	—	1–1	2–2	2–4	0–1
Marsa	2–2	1–8	0–5	1–1	—	3–4	0–5	0–9
Sliema Wanderers	0–1	1–1	0–2	1–1	2–1	—	3–1	0–4
St. George's	2–1	2–2	0–4	3–3	2–1	2–1	—	2–3
Valletta	5–0	4–1	2–1	1–1	0–1	1–1	3–0	—

Legend: Blue = home team win; Yellow = draw; Red = away team win.
