= Joe Cilia =

Maltese footballer (1937–2017)

Personal information
- Date of birth: 22 October 1937
- Place of birth: Malta
- Date of death: 5 August 2017 (aged 79)
- Place of death: Msida, Malta
- Height: 1.72 m (5 ft 8 in)
- Position: Defender

Senior career*
Years	Team	Apps	(Gls)
1955–1956	Rabat	31	(0)
1956–1964	Valletta	112	(3)
1965	Melita Eagles		
1971–1973	Valletta	16	(0)
1973–1974	Siġġiewi	14	(3)

International career
1959–1962	Malta	6	(0)
1957–1964	Malta XI	4	(0)

Managerial career
- 1983–1985: Valletta
- 1985–1986: Rabat Ajax
- 1989–1992: Hibernians
- 1994–1995: Valletta
- * Club domestic league appearances and goals

Joseph Cilia (22 October 1937 – 5 August 2017) was a Maltese professional football player and manager.

== Playing career ==
At the age of nineteen, in 1957, Cilia debuted on the Malta national team. He was the youngest player on the team when it played Malta's first international match against Austria. He became an automatic choice for the Malta XI, and Malta captain from 1959 to 1964. He earned a total of 10 caps (4 unofficial). He was captain for all the other teams he played with and is now considered to be one of Malta's greatest centre-halves.

With Valletta, he won all the titles on offer, to end a period dominated by Sliema Wanderers and Floriana. He played blinders against foreign teams, including Manchester United (0-1), helping Malta XI gain good results.

He was the first player to twice earn Maltese Player of the Year. He held records including playing 49 competitive games in one season and another for playing every game except one, for nine consecutive seasons between 1955 and 1964.

Between 1964 and 1971 he emigrated to Australia where he played for Melita Eagles, for whom he won Footballer of the Year again, Sutherland and Corinthians. On returning to Malta, he played another two seasons with Valletta, and played against Inter Milan. He exchanged shirts with Roberto Boninsegna. He retired in 1976.

== Managerial career ==
Having worked as player-coach since 1961, he could then dedicate more time to coaching. He coached most of the top-flight teams at the time, winning League Championship first with Valletta, from 1983 until 1985, and then all the honours available with Rabat Ajax, for two consecutive seasons. In 1989-1992 he worked with Hibernians He coached the Malta U/21 gaining two wins out of three games.

He won the Westin Malta Football Award in 2003, and "Gieh ir-Rabat" in 2004, in appreciation of his 50 years of continuous contribution to his football passion.

Cilia died on 5 August 2017, aged 79.
