= 1963–64 Maltese Premier League =

Maltese First Division
- Season: 1963–64
- Champions: Sliema Wanderers F.C. (16th title)
- Relegated: Melita F.C. St. George's F.C.
- European Cup: Sliema Wanderers F.C.
- European Cup Winners' Cup: Valletta F.C.
- Matches played: 56
- Goals scored: 186 (3.32 per match)

The 1963–64 Maltese First Division was the 49th season of top-tier football in Malta. It was contested by 8 teams, and Sliema Wanderers F.C. won the championship.

== League standings ==
Pos	Team	Pld	W	D	L	GF	GA	GD	Pts	Qualification
1	Sliema Wanderers F.C. (C)	14	13	0	1	39	9	+30	26	Qualification for the European Cup
2	Valletta F.C.	14	10	2	2	44	8	+36	22	Qualification for the European Cup Winners' Cup (Note: Valletta qualified for the Cup Winners' Cup as Maltese FA Trophy Winners)
3	Hibernians F.C.	14	7	3	4	26	16	+10	17	
4	Floriana F.C.	14	7	3	4	22	18	+4	17	
5	Hamrun Spartans F.C.	14	4	3	7	14	26	−12	11	
6	Rabat	14	4	2	8	24	37	−13	10	
7	Melita F.C. (R)	14	3	2	9	9	26	−17	8	Relegation
8	St. George's F.C. (R)	14	0	1	13	8	46	−38	1	Relegation

Source: rsssf.com
(C) Champions; (R) Relegated

== Results ==
Home \ Away	FRN	HIB	ĦMR	MLT	RBT	SLM	STG	VLT
Floriana	—	3–1	3–1	3–0	3–2	0–2	2–1	0–1
Hibernians	0–0	—	1–0	4–0	3–2	0–2	7–1	1–1
Ħamrun Spartans	1–1	1–0	—	1–0	2–2	1–4	2–0	1–6
Melita	0–2	1–1	0–0	—	2–1	0–2	1–0	1–2
Rabat	4–1	2–3	3–1	2–1	—	0–3	4–1	0–8
Sliema Wanderers	4–2	3–0	3–0	4–1	2–1	—	3–1	0–1
St. George's	0–1	0–4	0–3	0–1	1–1	2–6	—	0–2
Valletta	1–1	0–1	3–0	4–1	6–0	0–1	9–1	—

Legend: Blue = home team win; Yellow = draw; Red = away team win.
