= 1974–75 Maltese Premier League =

Maltese First Division
- Season: 1974–75
- Champions: Floriana F.C. (23rd title)
- Relegated: Gzira United; Mosta F.C.
- European Cup: Floriana F.C.
- European Cup Winners' Cup: Valletta F.C.
- UEFA Cup: Sliema Wanderers F.C.
- Matches played: 90
- Goals scored: 197 (2.19 per match)

The 1974–75 Maltese First Division was the 60th season of top-tier football in Malta. It was contested by 10 teams, and Floriana F.C. won the championship.

== League standings ==
Pos	Team	Pld	W	D	L	GF	GA	GD	Pts	Qualification
1	Floriana F.C. (C)	18	14	3	1	36	9	+27	31	Qualification for the European Cup
2	Sliema Wanderers F.C.	18	11	2	5	30	20	+10	24	Qualification for the UEFA Cup
3	St. George's F.C.	18	8	7	3	21	12	+9	23	
4	Birkirkara F.C.	18	8	4	6	17	21	−4	20	
5	Valletta F.C.	18	8	3	7	21	15	+6	19	Qualification for the European Cup Winners' Cup (Note: Valletta qualified for the Cup Winners' Cup as Maltese FA Trophy Winners)
6	Zebbug Rangers	18	4	8	6	16	16	0	16	
7	Marsa F.C.	18	6	3	9	16	17	−1	15	
8	Hibernians F.C.	18	5	5	8	16	19	−3	15	
9	Gzira United (R)	18	5	4	9	14	28	−14	14	Relegation
10	Mosta F.C. (R)	18	1	1	16	10	40	−30	3	Relegation

Source: rsssf.com
(C) Champions; (R) Relegated

== Results ==
Home \ Away	BKR	FRN	GŻI	HIB	MRS	MST	SLM	STG	VLT	ZEB
Birkirkara	—	0–1	2–0	0–0	1–0	2–1	0–1	3–2	0–2	0–0
Floriana	5–0	—	2–1	1–0	2–0	1–0	3–1	1–0	2–1	1–1
Gżira United	0–2	1–8	—	0–0	0–4	2–1	2–3	0–0	0–2	0–0
Hibernians	1–1	0–2	0–3	—	1–0	4–0	0–2	0–0	1–2	1–1
Marsa	2–1	1–1	0–1	1–0	—	1–3	0–1	1–1	0–0	1–0
Mosta	0–1	2–4	0–2	0–1	0–4	—	0–2	1–4	0–3	0–3
Sliema Wanderers	0–1	0–1	2–0	4–3	3–0	2–1	—	2–1	0–2	0–0
St. George's	1–1	1–0	0–0	2–0	1–0	1–0	2–1	—	2–0	2–1
Valletta	0–1	0–0	1–2	0–1	0–1	2–0	2–4	1–1	—	2–0
Żebbuġ Rangers	5–1	0–1	1–0	0–3	1–0	1–1	2–2	0–0	0–1	—

Legend: Blue = home team win; Yellow = draw; Red = away team win.
