= 1981–82 Maltese Premier League =

Maltese Premier League
- Season: 1981–82
- Champions: Hibernians F.C. (6th title)
- Relegated: Senglea Athletics F.C. Gzira United
- European Cup: Hibernians F.C.
- European Cup Winners' Cup: Sliema Wanderers F.C.
- UEFA Cup: Żurrieq F.C.
- Matches played: 57
- Goals scored: 158 (2.77 per match)

The 1981–82 Maltese Premier League was the 2nd season of the Maltese Premier League, and the 67th season of top-tier football in Malta. It was contested by eight teams, and Hibernians F.C. won the championship.

== Teams ==
Locations of the 1981–82 Maltese Premier League teams

== League standings ==
| Pos | Team | Pld | W | D | L | GF | GA | GD | Pts | Qualification |
|---|---|---|---|---|---|---|---|---|---|---|
| 1 | Hibernians F.C. (C) | 14 | 12 | 2 | 0 | 36 | 7 | +29 | 26 | Qualification for the European Cup |
| 2 | Sliema Wanderers F.C. | 14 | 8 | 2 | 4 | 24 | 20 | +4 | 18 | Qualification for the European Cup Winners' Cup (Note: Sliema Wanderers qualified for the Cup Winners' Cup as Maltese FA Trophy Runners-up, as winners Hibernians already qualified for the European Cup.) |
| 3 | Żurrieq F.C. | 14 | 7 | 2 | 5 | 19 | 13 | +6 | 16 | Qualification for the UEFA Cup |
| 4 | Floriana F.C. | 14 | 7 | 2 | 5 | 22 | 15 | +7 | 16 | |
| 5 | Valletta F.C. | 14 | 5 | 3 | 6 | 17 | 18 | −1 | 13 | |
| 6 | Ħamrun Spartans F.C. | 14 | 5 | 2 | 7 | 19 | 23 | −4 | 12 | |
| 7 | Senglea Athletics F.C. (R) | 14 | 4 | 2 | 8 | 13 | 27 | −14 | 10 | Relegation |
| 8 | Gzira United (R) | 14 | 0 | 1 | 13 | 7 | 34 | −27 | 1 | Relegation |

Source: rsssf.com
(C) Champions; (R) Relegated

== Third Place tie-breaker ==
With both Zurrieq and Floriana level on 16 points, a play-off match was conducted to qualification for the UEFA Cup

| Żurrieq F.C. | 1–0 | Floriana F.C. |

== Results ==
| Home \ Away | FRN | GŻR | HIB | ĦMR | SNA | SLM | VLT | ŻRQ |
|---|---|---|---|---|---|---|---|---|
| Floriana | — | 2–0 | 0–2 | 2–0 | 2–0 | 0–3 | 1–1 | 2–0 |
| Gżira United | 1–2 | — | 0–1 | 0–4 | 1–1 | 1–4 | 1–2 | 0–2 |
| Hibernians | 3–2 | 3–0 | — | 5–0 | 5–1 | 4–2 | 3–0 | 0–0 |
| Ħamrun Spartans | 1–0 | 5–1 | 1–1 | — | 0–1 | 1–2 | 1–0 | 1–1 |
| Senglea Athletics | 2–5 | 1–0 | 0–3 | 0–2 | — | 0–1 | 1–3 | 2–1 |
| Sliema Wanderers | 1–4 | 3–2 | 1–4 | 3–1 | 1–1 | — | 0–0 | 1–0 |
| Valletta | 0–0 | 2–0 | 0–1 | 3–1 | 1–2 | 2–1 | — | 1–2 |
| Żurrieq | 1–0 | 2–0 | 0–1 | 4–1 | 2–1 | 0–1 | 4–2 | — |

Legend: Blue = home team win; Yellow = draw; Red = away team win.
