= 1962–63 Maltese Premier League =

Maltese First Division
- Season: 1962–63
- Champions: Valletta F.C. (8th title)
- Relegated: Birkirkara F.C.
- European Cup: Valletta F.C.
- European Cup Winners' Cup: Sliema Wanderers F.C.
- Matches played: 56
- Goals scored: 197 (3.52 per match)

The 1962–63 Maltese First Division was the 48th season of top-tier football in Malta. It was contested by 9 teams, and Valletta F.C. won the championship.

== League standings ==
Pos	Team	Pld	W	D	L	GF	GA	GD	Pts	Qualification
1	Valletta F.C. (C)	14	11	2	1	46	9	+37	24	Qualification for the European Cup
2	Hibernians F.C.	14	10	1	3	35	11	+24	21	
3	Sliema Wanderers F.C.	14	9	3	2	26	13	+13	21	Qualification for the European Cup Winners' Cup (Note: Sliema Wanderers qualified for the Cup Winners' Cup as Maltese FA Trophy Winners)
4	Floriana F.C.	14	7	2	5	30	22	+8	16	
5	Hamrun Spartans F.C.	14	5	4	5	21	19	+2	14	
6	St. George's F.C.	14	3	3	8	17	28	−11	9	
7	Rabat	14	3	0	11	14	37	−23	6	
8	Birkirkara F.C. (R)	14	0	1	13	8	58	−50	1	Relegation

Source: rsssf.com
(C) Champions; (R) Relegated

== Results ==
Home \ Away	BKR	FRN	HIB	ĦMR	RBT	SLM	STG	VLT
Birkirkara	—	0–5	0–9	1–4	1–5	0–5	1–2	0–5
Floriana	6–2	—	1–2	2–1	5–0	0–1	1–1	1–3
Hibernians	3–0	1–0	—	4–2	5–0	0–1	1–0	1–1
Ħamrun Spartans	1–1	2–3	2–1	—	1–0	1–1	0–0	0–2
Rabat	2–1	0–2	1–2	0–3	—	2–3	2–0	0–5
Sliema Wanderers	2–1	1–1	0–2	1–0	1–0	—	3–3	0–1
St. George's	3–0	2–3	1–4	1–2	3–0	1–4	—	0–2
Valletta	6–0	6–0	2–0	2–2	5–2	1–3	5–0	—

Legend: Blue = home team win; Yellow = draw; Red = away team win.
