= 1994–95 Maltese Premier League =

Maltese Premier League
- Season: 1994–95
- Champions: Hibernians F.C. (8th title)
- Relegated: Pietà Hotspurs F.C. St. George's F.C.
- UEFA Cup: Hibernians F.C. Sliema Wanderers F.C.
- UEFA Cup Winners' Cup: Valletta F.C.
- UEFA Intertoto Cup: Floriana F.C.
- Matches played: 90
- Goals scored: 274 (3.04 per match)
- Top goalscorer: Carl Saunders (18)

The 1994–95 Maltese Premier League was the 15th season of the Maltese Premier League, and the 80th season of top-tier football in Malta. It was contested by 10 teams, and Hibernians F.C. won the championship.

== Teams ==
Locations of the 1994–95 Maltese Premier League teams

== League standings ==
Pos	Team	Pld	W	D	L	GF	GA	GD	Pts	Qualification
1	Hibernians F.C. (C)	18	13	4	1	42	11	+31	43	Qualification for the UEFA Cup
2	Sliema Wanderers F.C.	18	12	3	3	55	22	+33	39	Qualification for the UEFA Cup
3	Valletta F.C.	18	11	4	3	45	12	+33	37	Qualification for the UEFA Cup Winners' Cup (Note: Valletta qualified for the Cup Winners' Cup as Maltese FA Trophy Winners)
4	Floriana F.C.	18	10	5	3	33	13	+20	35	Qualification for the UEFA Intertoto Cup
5	Hamrun Spartans F.C.	18	10	2	6	34	23	+11	32	
6	Birkirkara Luxol	18	5	6	7	17	24	−7	21	
7	Żurrieq F.C.	18	6	2	10	18	36	−18	20	
8	Naxxar Lions	18	4	3	11	15	37	−22	15	
9	Pietà Hotspurs F.C. (R)	18	2	3	13	11	40	−29	9	Relegation
10	St. George's F.C. (R)	18	0	2	16	4	56	−52	2	Relegation

Source: rsssf.com
(C) Champions; (R) Relegated

== Results ==
Home \ Away	BKR	FRN	HIB	ĦMR	NXR	PTA	SLM	STG	VLT	ŻRQ
Birkirkara Luxol	—	0–4	0–0	1–2	1–1	0–0	0–6	2–0	0–1	1–2
Floriana	2–1	—	1–2	2–1	1–1	3–0	3–1	4–0	0–0	1–0
Hibernians	1–1	0–0	—	1–0	3–1	3–0	1–3	7–0	1–0	3–1
Ħamrun Spartans	1–2	0–0	1–2	—	3–0	2–1	3–1	3–0	1–6	0–0
Naxxar Lions	0–1	3–1	0–2	0–4	—	1–3	0–5	2–0	0–5	0–1
Pietà Hotspurs	1–3	0–1	0–2	1–3	1–1	—	0–6	1–0	1–3	0–3
Sliema Wanderers	0–0	2–1	2–2	5–2	4–0	5–2	—	6–1	0–5	4–1
St. George's	0–3	0–5	0–6	1–4	0–2	0–0	0–2	—	0–0	1–3
Valletta	3–1	2–2	1–2	0–1	3–2	2–0	0–0	3–0	—	6–1
Żurrieq	0–0	0–2	0–5	0–3	0–1	2–0	1–3	3–1	0–5	—

Legend: Blue = home team win; Yellow = draw; Red = away team win.

== Top goalscorers ==
Rank	Player	Club	Goals
1	(England) Carl Saunders	Sliema Wanderers	18
2	(Malta) Stefan Sultana	Ħamrun Spartans	13
3	(Malta) Hubert Suda	Sliema Wanderers	12
4	(Malta) Joe Zarb	Valletta	11
5	(Malta) Conrad Sultana	Hibernians	9
5	(Federal Republic of Yugoslavia) Igor Stefanović	Floriana	9
7	(England) George Lawrence	Hibernians	8
7	(Malta) Aldrin Muscat	Żurrieq	8
7	(Federal Republic of Yugoslavia) Danilo Dončić	Valletta	8
10	(Malta) Carmel Busuttil	Sliema Wanderers	7
10	(Malta) Gilbert Agius	Valletta	7
10	(England) Jason Kabia	Valletta	7
