= Ronnie Cocks =

Maltese footballer and manager

Personal information
- Date of birth: 1 August 1943
- Place of birth: Gżira, Malta
- Date of death: 16 May 2017 (aged 73)
- Position: Striker

Senior career*
Years	Team	Apps	(Gls)
1956–1961	Gżira United		
1962–1966	Sliema Wanderers		
1967	Pittsburgh Phantoms	17	(10)
1968–1974	Sliema Wanderers		
1975–1978	Ħamrun Spartans		
1978–	Pietà Hotspurs		
- Gżira United

International career
1966–1978	Malta	21	(1)

Managerial career
- Pietà Hotspurs
- Mosta
- Gżira United
- Msida
- St. George's
- Pembroke
- * Club domestic league appearances and goals

Ronald Cocks (1 August 1943 – 16 May 2017) was a Maltese footballer. He captained Malta's national football team 13 times, including in a match against England at Wembley in 1971.

== Playing career ==
=== Club ===
Cocks played mainly for Gżira United and the Sliema Wanderers, and had a short spell with the Pittsburgh Phantoms in 1967. He was named Maltese Player of the Year for the 1965/66 season.

=== International ===
Cocks made his debut for Malta in a February 1966 friendly match against Libya and earned a total of 21 caps, scoring 1 goal. His final international was a March 1978 friendly against Tunisia.

== Managerial career ==
He also coached several Maltese clubs, amongst them Pietà, Mosta and Gzira. He later worked at the Academy at Luxol.

== Personal life ==
Cocks was married to Marianne and the couple had three children. During his playing career he also worked as a welder and panel-beater at Gasan Group of Companies, at Panta Lesco and again at Gasan. He also had jobs with Bortex Clothing factory and Heidemann and worked as a fitness instructor at two hotels.

He died in May 2017.
