= 1966–67 Maltese Premier League =

Maltese First Division
- Season: 1966–67
- Champions: Hibernians F.C. (2nd title)
- Relegated: no relegation
- European Cup: Hibernians F.C.
- European Cup Winners' Cup: Floriana F.C.
- Matches played: 30
- Goals scored: 88 (2.93 per match)

The 1966–67 Maltese First Division was the 52nd season of top-tier football in Malta. It was contested by 6 teams, and Hibernians F.C. won the championship.

== League standings ==
Pos	Team	Pld	W	D	L	GF	GA	GD	Pts	Qualification
1	Hibernians F.C. (C)	10	7	3	0	15	2	+13	17	Qualification for the European Cup
2	Sliema Wanderers F.C.	10	7	2	1	25	7	+18	16	
3	Floriana F.C.	10	4	2	4	13	12	+1	10	Qualification for the European Cup Winners' Cup (Note: Floriana qualified for the Cup Winners' Cup as Maltese FA Trophy Winners)
4	Valletta F.C.	10	4	3	3	14	11	+3	9 (Note: 2 points deducted.)	
5	Hamrun Spartans F.C.	10	1	1	8	12	28	−16	3	
6	St. George's F.C.	10	0	3	7	9	28	−19	3	

Source: rsssf.com
(C) Champions

== Results ==
Home \ Away	FRN	HIB	ĦMR	SLM	STG	VLT
Floriana	—	0–2	3–0	0–4	1–1	0–1
Hibernians	0–0	—	5–0	3–1	1–0	0–0
Ħamrun Spartans	1–2	0–0	—	1–2	2–2	1–3
Sliema Wanderers	2–1	1–1	5–1	—	5–0	1–0
St. George's	1–3	0–1	2–5	0–4	—	1–4
Valletta	0–3	0–2	4–1	0–0	2–2	—

Legend: Blue = home team win; Yellow = draw; Red = away team win.
