= 1960–61 Maltese Premier League =

Maltese First Division
- Season: 1960–61
- Champions: Hibernians F.C. (1st title)
- Relegated: Marsa F.C.
- European Cup: Hibernians F.C.
- European Cup Winners' Cup: Floriana F.C.
- Matches played: 56
- Goals scored: 195 (3.48 per match)

The 1960–61 Maltese First Division was the 46th season of top-tier football in Malta. It was contested by 8 teams, and Hibernians F.C. won the championship.

== League standings ==
Pos	Team	Pld	W	D	L	GF	GA	GD	Pts	Qualification
1	Hibernians F.C. (C)	14	12	1	1	34	13	+21	25	Qualification for the European Cup
2	Valletta F.C.	14	10	2	2	38	10	+28	22	
3	Sliema Wanderers F.C.	14	9	2	3	31	16	+15	20	
4	Floriana F.C.	14	6	2	6	32	27	+5	14	Qualification for the European Cup Winners' Cup (Note: Floriana qualified for the Cup Winners' Cup as Maltese FA Trophy Winners)
5	St. George's F.C.	14	4	3	7	23	31	−8	11	
6	Hamrun Spartans F.C.	14	2	4	8	16	25	−9	8	
7	St. Patrick F.C.	14	4	0	10	12	37	−25	8	
8	Marsa F.C. (R)	14	1	2	11	9	36	−27	4	Relegation

Source: rsssf.com
(C) Champions; (R) Relegated

== Results ==
Home \ Away	FRN	HIB	ĦMR	MRS	SLM	STG	STP	VLT
Floriana	—	2–4	6–1	2–0	1–3	3–0	3–0	1–4
Hibernians	2–1	—	1–0	2–0	1–1	2–1	2–0	2–3
Ħamrun Spartans	2–3	1–2	—	1–1	1–1	2–2	0–1	0–2
Marsa	3–1	0–5	0–3	—	1–6	2–2	1–2	0–0
Sliema Wanderers	1–3	1–2	2–1	2–0	—	3–2	4–1	2–1
St. George's	3–2	1–4	0–0	4–1	0–2	—	3–2	0–3
St. Patrick	2–1	1–3	1–4	1–0	0–3	1–4	—	0–1
Valletta	2–2	1–2	3–0	4–0	2–0	4–1	8–0	—

Legend: Blue = home team win; Yellow = draw; Red = away team win.
