= 1968–69 Maltese Premier League =

Maltese First Division
- Season: 1968–69
- Champions: Hibernians F.C. (3rd title)
- Relegated: Birkirkara F.C. St. George's F.C.
- European Cup: Hibernians F.C.
- European Cup Winners' Cup: Sliema Wanderers F.C.
- Inter-Cities Fairs Cup: Floriana F.C.
- Matches played: 56
- Goals scored: 137 (2.45 per match)

The 1968–69 Maltese First Division was the 54th season of top-tier football in Malta. It was contested by 8 teams, and Hibernians F.C. won the championship.

== League standings ==
| Pos | Team | Pld | W | D | L | GF | GA | GD | Pts | Qualification |
|---|---|---|---|---|---|---|---|---|---|---|
| 1 | Hibernians F.C. (C) | 14 | 9 | 3 | 2 | 28 | 11 | +17 | 21 | Qualification for the European Cup |
| 2 | Floriana F.C. | 14 | 7 | 4 | 3 | 19 | 10 | +9 | 18 | Qualification for the Inter-Cities Fairs Cup |
| 3 | Valletta F.C. | 14 | 8 | 2 | 4 | 23 | 9 | +14 | 18 | |
| 4 | Sliema Wanderers F.C. | 14 | 6 | 5 | 3 | 14 | 8 | +6 | 17 | Qualification for the European Cup Winners' Cup (Note: Sliema Wanderers qualified for the Cup Winners' Cup as Maltese FA Trophy Winners) |
| 5 | Gzira United | 14 | 8 | 0 | 6 | 21 | 17 | +4 | 16 | |
| 6 | Hamrun Spartans F.C. | 14 | 3 | 4 | 7 | 10 | 17 | −7 | 10 | |
| 7 | Birkirkara F.C. (R) | 14 | 3 | 1 | 10 | 13 | 29 | −16 | 7 | Relegation |
| 8 | St. George's F.C. (R) | 14 | 2 | 1 | 11 | 9 | 36 | −27 | 5 | Relegation |

Source: rsssf.com
(C) Champions; (R) Relegated

== Second Place tie-breaker ==
With both Floriana and Valletta level on 18 points, a play-off match was conducted to qualification for the Inter-Cities Fairs Cup

| Floriana | 2–0 | Valletta |

== Results ==
| Home \ Away | BKR | FRN | GŻI | HIB | ĦMR | SLM | STG | VLT |
|---|---|---|---|---|---|---|---|---|
| Birkirkara | — | 2–2 | 0–5 | 0–3 | 2–0 | 0–2 | 1–2 | 0–1 |
| Floriana | 2–1 | — | 1–2 | 0–0 | 2–0 | 1–0 | 2–1 | 0–1 |
| Gżira United | 1–2 | 0–2 | — | 0–3 | 1–0 | 1–2 | 3–0 | 0–2 |
| Hibernians | 4–1 | 2–5 | 3–1 | — | 3–1 | 1–1 | 5–0 | 1–0 |
| Ħamrun Spartans | 2–1 | 1–0 | 0–2 | 0–0 | — | 0–0 | 3–1 | 0–1 |
| Sliema Wanderers | 1–2 | 0–0 | 0–1 | 1–0 | 1–1 | — | 2–0 | 2–1 |
| St. George's | 1–0 | 0–2 | 1–2 | 1–2 | 1–1 | 0–2 | — | 1–5 |
| Valletta | 3–1 | 0–0 | 1–2 | 0–1 | 2–1 | 0–0 | 6–0 | — |

Legend: Blue = home team win; Yellow = draw; Red = away team win.
