= Mark Miller (footballer) =

English footballer and manager

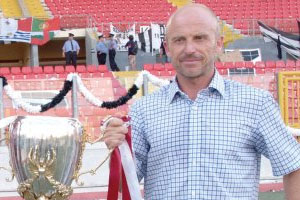
- Miller in 2010

Personal information
- Full name: Mark John Miller
- Date of birth: 22 September 1962 (age 64)
- Place of birth: Tynemouth, England
- Position: Midfielder

Team information
- Current team: Żurrieq (Nursery Head Manager)

Youth career
- 1979–1980: Newcastle United

Senior career*
Years	Team	Apps	(Gls)
1980–1981	Whitley Bay		
1981–1983	Gillingham	9	(1)
- Whitley Bay
1983–1984	Doncaster Rovers	30	(4)
1984	Darlington	7	(1)
1985	Floriana	12	(2)
1985–1987	Rabat Ajax	27	(5)
1987	PS Apollo		(5)
1987–1994	Floriana	105	(12)
1994-1996	Sliema Wanderers	29	(8)
1996-1997	Hibernians	15	(1)

Managerial career
- 1992–1994: Floriana (player/coach)
- 1996: Sliema Wanderers (player/coach)
- 1997–1999: Hibernians
- 2000–2002: Malta U16
- 2002–2008: Malta U21
- 2008–2012: Hibernians
- 2012–2014: Valletta
- 2015: Qormi
- 2016–2018: Hibernians
- 2018–2020: Mosta
- 2020–2021: Balzan
- 2022–2023: Żabbar St. Patrick
- 2023–: Żurrieq (U-19)
- 2024–2025: Żurrieq (asst.)
- * Club domestic league appearances and goals as of 2 October 2023

Mark John Miller (born 22 September 1962) is an English manager, currently in charge of the Żurrieq U-19s, and former footballer.

== Playing career ==
During his career he played as a midfielder and played in Malta and Finland towards the end of his career.

After his experience in Finland, Miller returned to Malta and played and managed Floriana. During his time with the Greens they won the Premier League, FA Trophy and the Super Cup.

Miller joined Sliema Wanderers as player/coach during this time he won the Premier League (1995–96)

== Managerial career ==
Miller joined the technical set up of Hibernians in 1996, remaining with the club until 1999. Miller was then associated with the Malta Football Association until 2008, serving as head coach of the Malta national under-21 football team. Following the Premier League triumph in 2008–09, Miller crossed the divide and joined Valletta where he spent two years as manager.

In 2015, Miller took over Qormi, who were bottom of the League, after Josef Mansueto's resignation. In the following season, Miller rejoined Hibernians leading them to another Premier League title, the 12th in their history. In the 2017–18 season, following a run of results which saw them drop to seventh in the League table, Miller and Hibernians mutually parted ways.

He was appointed the head coach of Mosta in November 2018 and left Mosta by mutual agreement in June 2020, after reaching a 9th and an 8th place in the league.

On 22 June 2020 Miller was appointed as new head coach of the Maltese Premier League side Balzan F.C., signing a two-years contract. On 19 October 2021 he stepped down from his position, after a 2–1 defeat against his former team Floriana. In June 2022, Miller was appointed manager of Żabbar St. Patrick.

== Honours ==
=== Player ===
Rabat Ajax

- Maltese Premier League: 1986
- Maltese FA Trophy: 1986
- Maltese Super Cup: 1986

Floriana

- Maltese Premier League: 1993
- Maltese FA Trophy: 1993, 1994
- Maltese Super Cup: 1993

Sliema Wanderers

- Maltese Premier League: 1996
- Maltese Super Cup: 1996

=== Managerial ===
Hibernians

- Maltese Premier League: 2008–09, 2016–17
- Maltese FA Trophy: 1997–98

Valletta

- Maltese Premier League: 2013–14
- Maltese FA Trophy: 2013–14
