= 1976–77 Maltese Premier League =

Maltese First Division
- Season: 1976–77
- Champions: Floriana F.C. (24th title)
- Relegated: Zebbug Rangers; Senglea Athletics F.C.
- European Cup: Floriana F.C.
- European Cup Winners' Cup: Valletta F.C.
- UEFA Cup: Sliema Wanderers F.C.
- Matches played: 92
- Goals scored: 290 (3.15 per match)

The 1976–77 Maltese First Division was the 62nd season of top-tier football in Malta. It was contested by 10 teams, and Floriana F.C. won the championship.

== League standings ==
Pos	Team	Pld	W	D	L	GF	GA	GD	Pts	Qualification
1	Floriana F.C. (C)	18	15	3	0	53	12	+41	33	Qualification for the European Cup
2	Sliema Wanderers F.C.	18	10	7	1	34	14	+20	27	Qualification for the UEFA Cup
3	Valletta F.C.	18	10	5	3	43	19	+24	25	Qualification for the European Cup Winners' Cup (Note: Valletta qualified for the Cup Winners' Cup as Maltese FA Trophy Winners)
4	Hibernians F.C.	18	9	5	4	34	28	+6	23	
5	Hamrun Spartans F.C.	18	6	3	9	24	20	+4	15	
6	Vittoriosa Stars F.C.	18	5	4	9	19	35	−16	14	
7	St. George's F.C.	18	4	6	8	20	42	−22	14	
8	Msida Saint-Joseph F.C.	18	4	5	9	23	36	−13	13	
9	Zebbug Rangers (R)	18	5	3	10	20	27	−7	13	Relegation
10	Senglea Athletics F.C. (R)	18	0	3	15	14	51	−37	3	Relegation

Source: rsssf.com
(C) Champions; (R) Relegated

=== Relegation tie-breaker ===
With both Msida Saint-Joseph and Zebbug Rangers level on 13 points, a play-off match was conducted to Relegation

Msida Saint-Joseph F.C.	1–1	Zebbug Rangers	Gżira
			Stadium: Empire Stadium

Replay	Msida Saint-Joseph F.C.	2–2 (a.e.t.) (4–2 p)	Zebbug Rangers	Gżira
				Stadium: Empire Stadium

== Results ==
Home \ Away	FRN	HIB	ĦMR	MSD	SNA	SLM	STG	VLT	VTS	ZEB
Floriana	—	2–0	2–1	3–1	3–1	1–1	1–1	3–1	3–1	1–0
Hibernians	0–5	—	2–1	4–2	3–3	2–2	1–0	1–1	4–1	2–1
Ħamrun Spartans	1–2	1–2	—	0–1	3–1	0–1	4–0	0–1	1–1	1–0
Msida Saint-Joseph	0–5	3–0	2–2	—	3–2	1–1	1–3	1–3	0–1	3–4
Senglea Athletics	1–8	0–4	1–2	2–2	—	0–2	0–2	0–2	1–2	1–2
Sliema Wanderers	0–1	2–2	1–0	2–1	4–0	—	1–1	2–2	3–1	4–2
St. George's	1–7	1–3	1–5	0–0	1–1	0–3	—	0–4	3–1	2–1
Valletta	1–1	0–2	2–1	4–1	4–0	0–0	7–2	—	4–0	0–1
Vittoriosa Stars	1–2	3–2	0–0	0–1	1–0	0–3	1–1	3–3	—	1–0
Żebbuġ Rangers	0–3	0–0	0–1	0–0	3–0	0–2	1–1	1–4	4–1	—

Legend: Blue = home team win; Yellow = draw; Red = away team win.
