= Marsa F.C. =

Maltese football club

- Full name: Marsa Football Club
- Founded: 1920; 105 years ago
- Ground: Centenary Stadium, Malta
- Manager: Orosco Anonam
- League: Maltese Challenge League
- 2022–23: Maltese Challenge League, 12th

Marsa Football Club are a Maltese football club from the harbour town of Marsa, which currently plays in the Maltese Challenge League.

The team played at the UEFA Cup during the 1971–72 season and has played several seasons in the Maltese top division.
