= 2000–01 Maltese FA Trophy =

Tournament details
- Country: Malta

Final positions
- Champions: Valletta (11th title)
- Runners-up: Birkirkara

The 2000–01 Maltese FA Trophy (known as the Rothmans Trophy for sponsorship reasons) was the 63rd season since its establishment. The competition started on 24 December 2000 and ended on 17 May 2001 with the final, which Valletta won 3-0 against Birkirkara.

== First round ==
Team 1	Score	Team 2
24 December 2000
Marsa	2–1	Hamrun Spartans
Qormi	1–6	Hibernians
Mosta	0–4	Pietà Hotspurs
27 December 2000
Naxxar Lions	2–3 (a.e.t.)	Marsaxlokk
28 December 2000
Gozo	0–3	St. Andrews
31 December 2000
Xghajra Tornadoes	3–3 (a.e.t.) (1–3 p)	Tarxien Rainbows
4 February 2001
Żurrieq	2–3	St. Patrick
4 March 2001
Rabat Ajax	1–1 (a.e.t.) (3–2 p)	Lija Athletic

== Second round ==
Team 1	Score	Team 2
27 March 2001
Pietà Hotspurs	2–1 (a.e.t.)	Rabat Ajax
St. Patrick	4–4 (a.e.t.) (2–4 p)	St. Andrews
Marsaxlokk	0–3	Hibernians
Marsa	2–2 (a.e.t.) (4–1 p)	Tarxien Rainbows

== Quarter-finals ==
Team 1	Score	Team 2
5 May 2001
Valletta	5–0	Marsa
St. Andrews	0–4	Floriana
6 May 2001
Sliema Wanderers	4–0	Pietà Hotspurs
Birkirkara	2–0	Hibernians

== Semi-finals ==
10 May 2001	Sliema Wanderers	1–2 (a.e.t.)	Birkirkara	Ta' Qali
	Turner 20'	Report	M. Galea 14'; L. Galea 94'	Stadium: Ta' Qali National Stadium; Referee: Lorry Sammut

11 May 2001	Valletta	2–1	Floriana	Ta' Qali
	Oretan 23'; Carabott 59'	Report	Said 90+3'	Stadium: Ta' Qali National Stadium; Referee: Charles Agius

== Final ==
24 May 2001

Birkirkara	0–3	Valletta
	Report	Agius 4'; Dvorak 70'; Zammit 85'

Ta' Qali National Stadium, Ta' Qali
Referee: Emmanuel R. Zammit
