= 2002–03 Maltese FA Trophy =

Tournament details
- Country: Malta

Final positions
- Champions: Birkirkara (2nd title)
- Runners-up: Sliema Wanderers

The 2002–03 Maltese FA Trophy was the 65th season since its establishment. The competition started on 2 November 2002 and ended on 22 May 2003 with the final, which Birkirkara won 1-0 against Sliema Wanderers.

== First round ==
Team 1	Score	Team 2
2 November 2002
Gozo	1–2	Mosta
Hamrun Spartans	0–3	Msida St. Joseph
9 November 2002
Pietà Hotspurs	4–1	Lija Athletic
Rabat Ajax	1–6	Floriana
16 November 2002
Balzan Youths	0–4	Mqabba
Xghajra Tornadoes	0–1	Naxxar Lions
23 November 2002
St. Patrick	2–3	Marsa
Marsaxlokk	2–0	Senglea Athletic

== Second round ==
Team 1	Score	Team 2
8 February 2003
Msida St. Joseph	2–4	Marsaxlokk
Marsa	3–4	Pietà Hotspurs
9 February 2003
Floriana	5–0	Naxxar Lions
Mqabba	1–2 (a.e.t.)	Mosta

== Quarter-finals ==
Team 1	Score	Team 2
21 March 2003
Mosta	0–5	Birkirkara
Sliema Wanderers	2–1 (a.e.t.)	Pietà Hotspurs
22 March 2003
Valletta	0–1	Hibernians
Floriana	2–0 (a.e.t.)	Marsaxlokk

== Semi-finals ==
18 May 2003	Floriana	1–4	Birkirkara	Ta' Qali
	Mifsud Triganza 88'	Report	Calascione 26', 67', 79'; Galea 50'	Stadium: Ta' Qali National Stadium; Referee: Lorry Sammut

18 May 2003	Sliema Wanderers	5–2 (a.e.t.)	Hibernians	Ta' Qali
	Dončić 24', 71', 110', 116'; Anonam 118'	Report	Mbong 47'; Paiber 88' (pen.)	Stadium: Ta' Qali National Stadium; Referee: Joe Attard

== Final ==
22 May 2003

Birkirkara	1–0	Sliema Wanderers
Galea 90+3'	Report

Ta' Qali National Stadium, Ta' Qali
Referee: Charles Agius
