= 2006–07 Maltese FA Trophy =

Tournament details
- Country: Malta

Final positions
- Champions: Hibernians (8th title)
- Runners-up: Sliema Wanderers

The 2006–07 Maltese FA Trophy (known as U*BET FA Trophy for sponsorship reasons) was the 69th season since its establishment. The competition started on 28 October 2006 and ended on 25 May 2007 with the final, which Hibernians won after the penalties against Sliema Wanderers.

== First round ==
| Team 1 | Score | Team 2 |
|---|---|---|
28 October 2006
| St. Patrick | 4–0 | Senglea Athletic |
| Tarxien Rainbows | 2–1 | Hamrun Spartans |
29 October 2006
| Vittoriosa Stars | 0–1 | Pietà Hotspurs |
| Marsa | 3–3 (a.e.t.) (9–8 p) | Qormi |
4 November 2006
| Mqabba | 5–3 (a.e.t.) | St. George's |
| Floriana | 0–2 | Mosta |
5 November 2006
| Naxxar Lions | 0–2 | Msida St. Joseph |
| Valletta | 1–0 | San Gwann |

== Second round ==
| Team 1 | Score | Team 2 |
|---|---|---|
17 February 2007
| Valletta | 3–2 | Mqabba |
| Mosta | 1–5 | Msida St. Joseph |
18 February 2007
| St. Patrick | 2–3 | Pietà Hotspurs |
| Tarxien Rainbows | 3–3 (a.e.t.) (2–4 p) | Marsa |

== Quarter-finals ==
| Team 1 | Score | Team 2 |
|---|---|---|
7 April 2007
| Hibernians | 4–0 | Marsa |
| Sliema Wanderers | 2–1 | Birkirkara |
8 April 2007
| Msida St. Joseph | 1–0 | Pietà Hotspurs |
| Valletta | 0–0 (a.e.t.) (4–3 p) | Marsaxlokk |

== Semi-finals ==
| 18 May 2007 | Hibernians | 2–1 | Valletta | Ta' Qali |
| | Cohen 69'; Scerri 87' | Report | Camilleri 37' | Stadium: Ta' Qali National Stadium; Referee: Paul Caruana |

| 20 May 2007 | Msida St. Joseph | 0–3 (a.e.t.) | Sliema Wanderers | Ta' Qali |
| | | Report | Giglio 110', 113'; Woods 120' | Stadium: Ta' Qali National Stadium; Referee: Alan Mario Sant |

== Final ==
25 May 2007

| Hibernians | 1–1 (a.e.t.) | Sliema Wanderers |
|---|---|---|
| André 90+2' | Report | Ciantar 70' |
Penalties
| Doffo (penalty scored); André (penalty scored); Xuereb (penalty scored) | 3–0 | (penalty missed) Anonam; (penalty missed) Carabott; (penalty missed) Said |

Ta' Qali National Stadium, Ta' Qali
Referee: Joe Attard
