= 2021–22 Maltese FA Trophy =

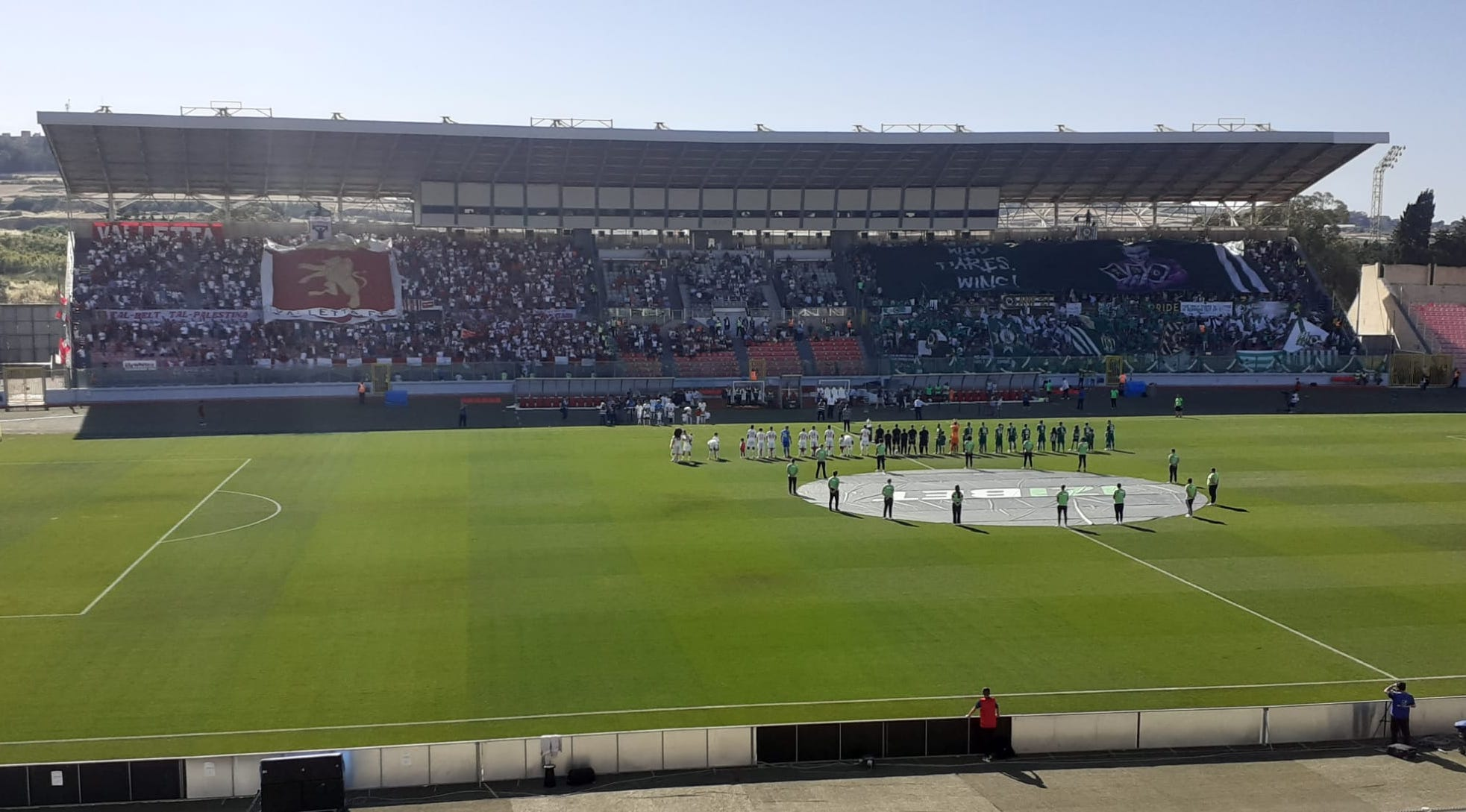
- Floriana and Valletta starting the 2022 FA Trophy final

Tournament details
- Country: Malta
- Dates: 7 December 2021 - 15 May 2022

Final positions
- Champions: Floriana
- Runners-up: Valletta

Tournament statistics
- Top goal scorer(s): (Argentina) Xuan Cappellino (Brazil) Promise Oluwatobi Emmanuel David (Brazil) Renan Sgaria Farias (4 Goals Each)

The 2021–22 Maltese FA Trophy, officially named IZIBET FA Trophy due to sponsorship reasons, is the 84th edition of the football cup competition, the FA Trophy. The winners of the Maltese FA Trophy will earn a place in the first qualifying round of the 2022–23 UEFA Europa Conference League. The first round of games started on 7 December 2021.

There was no winner of the previous cup because the Malta FA Executive Committee cancelled the competition due to the COVID-19 pandemic in Malta.

== Preliminary round ==
Fourteen preliminary round matches played on 7-9 December 2021. The draw for the preliminary round was held on 19 November 2021.

7 December 2021	Victoria Hotspurs (Gozo) (1)	1–4	Żebbuġ Rangers (3)	Xewkija
18:30 CEST	Andrea Debrincat 38'		Liam Gauci 21'; Glen Mifsud 25'; Miguel Perez Jimenez 30', 90'	Stadium: Gozo Stadium; Referee: Sandro Spiteri

7 December 2021	Mġarr United (2)	1–2	St. George's (2)	Ħamrun
20:30 CEST	Luca Camilleri 72'		Loumar Cutajar 20'; Lawrence Uchechi Chiedozie 41'	Stadium: Victor Tedesco Stadium; Referee: Emanuel Grech

8 December 2021	SK Victoria Wanderers (Gozo) (1)	1–3 (a.e.t.)	Melita (2)	Kerċem
11:00 CEST	Fabricio Rozkiewicz 34'		Christopher Baker 84'; Matthew Debattista 94'; Mattia Comes 98'	Stadium: Kerċem Ajax Stadium; Referee: Jason Portelli

8 December 2021	Sannat Lions (Gozo) (1)	1–1 (a.e.t.) (3–4 p)	Marsaskala (2)	Kerċem
13:30 CEST	Henry Fabian Solis 60'		Joseph Chetcuti 81'	Stadium: Kerċem Ajax Stadium; Referee: Mehmet Oral

8 December 2021	Marsaxlokk (2)	5–2 (a.e.t.)	Kerċem Ajax (Gozo) (1)	Ħamrun
14:00 CEST	Jeremy Delmar 14'; Xuan Cappellino 48', 98', 115'; Ryan Tonna 105'		Euller da Silva Rodrigues 15', 58'	Stadium: Victor Tedesco Stadium; Referee: Stefan Pace

8 December 2021	Qrendi (2)	1–4	Xewkija Tigers (Gozo) (1)	St. Paul's Bay
14:00 CEST	Ian Zammit 4'		Matthias Mercieca 45+3'; Shola Haruna Shodiya 50'; Emiliano Patricio Lattes 52'; John Axiaq 56'	Stadium: Sirens Stadium; Referee: Max-Lee Muscat

8 December 2021	Nadur Youngsters (Gozo) (1)	7–0	Oratory Youths (Gozo) (1)	Xewkija
14:00 CEST	Stefan Cassar 12', 50', 61'; Jordi Parnis 53', 90'; Ederson Bruno Dominges 31'; Marcelo Barbosa Junior 38'			Stadium: Gozo Stadium; Referee: Ezekiel Barbara

8 December 2021	Senglea Athletic (2)	1–2 (a.e.t.)	Tarxien Rainbows (2)	Ta' Qali
14:00 CEST	Lucas Mancuso Lemos dos Santos Ferreira 35'		Daneel Abela 46'; Carlos da Silva Conceicao Filho 105'	Stadium: Centenary Stadium; Referee: Slawomir Olucha

8 December 2021	Lija Athletic (2)	0–4	Fgura United (2)	Ħamrun
18:00 CEST			Donys Aldair Quintero 21', 30'; Dylan Caruana 44'; Jose Costa Silva Ewertton 61'	Stadium: Victor Tedesco Stadium; Referee: Aleksandar Jovanovic

8 December 2021	Vittoriosa Stars (2)	2–0	Mellieħa (3)	St. Paul's Bay
18:00 CEST	Quincy Bregman 69', 89'			Stadium: Sirens Stadium; Referee: Joseph Scerri

8 December 2021	Żabbar St. Patrick (3)	3–0	Mqabba (2)	Ta' Qali
18:00 CEST	Gianluca Zammit 3'; Francesco Gusman 11'; Michael Camilleri 63'			Stadium: Centenary Stadium; Referee: Glen Tonna

15 December 2021	Żurrieq (3)	1–3	St. Andrews (2)	Ħamrun
20:30 CEST	Andre Joe Cutajar 26'		Malcolm Vella Vidal 12'; Santiago Martinez Perlaza 60'; Jamie Sixsmith 72'	Stadium: Victor Tedesco Stadium; Referee: Jo-Anna Vassallo

16 December 2021	Pietà Hotspurs (2)	2–2 (a.e.t.) (4–2 p)	Rabat Ajax (2)	Ta' Qali
20:30 CEST	Yuto Morita 37', 63'		Miguel Aquilina 55'; Manuel Angel Bustos 90+1'	Stadium: Centenary Stadium; Referee: Emanuel Grech

22 December 2021	Naxxar Lions (2)	1–1 (a.e.t.) (6–5 p)	San Ġwann (2)	Ta' Qali
19:30 CEST	Edson Cerqueira Farias 81'		Skender Loshi 73'	Stadium: Centenary Stadium; Referee: Slobodan Petrovic

== Round Of 32 ==
Sixteen Matches will be played on 8-10 February and 15–16 February. The draw for the Round Of 32 and Round of 16 was held on 8 January 2021. The Round Of 32 featured all 12 clubs across the Premier League, who entered the competition in this round.

8 February 2022	Mosta (1)	5–0	Luqa St. Andrew's (2)	Ta' Qali
20:30 CEST	William Donkin 38', 61', 73'; Zachary Brincat 10', 15'			Stadium: Centenary Stadium; Referee: Daniel Casha

8 February 2022	Hibernians (1)	2–0	Nadur Youngsters (Gozo) (1)	Paola
18:30 CEST	Dunstan Vella 53'; Jake Grech 81'			Stadium: Tony Bezzina Stadium; Referee: Glen Tonna

8 February 2022	Melita (2)	1–2	St. George's (2)	Ħamrun
18:30 CEST	Nick Cutajar 3'		Matheus Freitas C Da Silva 40'; Rafael De Fex 53'	Stadium: Victor Tedesco Stadium; Referee: Slawomir Olucha

9 February 2022	Marsaskala (3)	0–5	Valletta (1)	Ta' Qali
17:00 CEST			Haris Dilaver 4' (pen.); Ivan Curjuric 35'; Shaun Dimech 47', 52'; Caio Prado 66' (pen.)	Stadium: Centenary Stadium; Referee: Daniel Portelli

9 February 2022	Gudja United (1)	4–0	Swieqi United (2)	Ta' Qali
21:00 CEST	Ahinga Bienvenu Selemani 29'; Farid Romero Zuniga 40'; Tatsuro Nagamatsu 48'; Nika Dzalamidze 50'			Stadium: Centenary Stadium; Referee: Ezekiel Barbara

9 February 2022	Floriana (1)	1–0	Għajnsielem (Gozo) (1)	Ta' Qali
18:30 CEST	Andrei Ciolacu 77'			Stadium: Ta' Qali National Stadium; Referee: Trustin Farrugia Cann

9 February 2022	Balzan (1)	5–1	Pietà Hotspurs (2)	Paola
19:00 CEST	Milan Duric 2', 10', 53'; Milos Mijic 31'; Bojan Kaljevic 47'		Joao Pedrinho Oliveira Santos 84'	Stadium: Tony Bezzina Stadium; Referee: Stefan Pace

9 February 2022	Marsa (2)	0–2	Tarxien Rainbows (2)	Ħamrun
20:30 CEST			Thiago Nonato Peixoto 4'; Karl Cutajar 33'	Stadium: Victor Tedesco Stadium; Referee: Joseph Scerri

10 February 2022	Ħamrun Spartans (1)	1–0	Naxxar Lions (2)	Ta' Qali
11:00 CEST	Fayssal El Bakhtaoui 28'			Stadium: Centenary Stadium; Referee: Darryl Agius

10 February 2022	Sliema Wanderers (1)	3–0	Vittoriosa Stars (2)	Ta' Qali
15:00 CEST	Juan Pablo Morales Rengifo 33'; Jake Engerer 45+1'; Omar Elouni 90+3'			Stadium: Centenary Stadium; Referee: Philip Farrugia

10 February 2022	Birkirkara (1)	4–0	Fgura United (2)	Ta' Qali
19:00 CEST	Luke Montebello 12'; Jeferson Macedo 18'; Kilian Bevis 26'; Federico Falcone 49'			Stadium: Centenary Stadium; Referee: Andrea Sciriha

10 February 2022	Santa Lucia (1)	4–1	Sirens (1)	Paola
19:00 CEST	Meghon Davidy Aytron Valpoort 3', 20'; Vito Plut 40'; Dexter Xuereb 64'		Marios Lomis 68'	Stadium: Tony Bezzina Stadium; Referee: Emanuel Grech

10 February 2022	Żejtun Corinthians (2)	7–1	Xewkija Tigers (Gozo) (1)	Ħamrun
16:00 CEST	Renan Sgaria Farias 7', 11', 20', 56'; Gillmore Azzopardi 29'; Panin Boakye Mensa 68'; Christian Grech 84'		Haruna Shodija Shola 79'	Stadium: Victor Tedesco Stadium; Referee: Slobodan Petrovic

15 February 2022	Pembroke Athleta (2)	0–1	Marsaxlokk (2)	Ħamrun
20:30 CEST			Emerson Vella 24'	Stadium: Victor Tedesco Stadium; Referee: Malcolm Spiteri

16 February 2022	Gżira United (1)	4–0	Żabbar St. Patrick (3)	Ta' Qali
20:30 CEST	Clive Gauci 26'; Gabriel Bohrer 59'; Jefferson De Assis 83'; Hytem Kabar 90+3'			Stadium: Centenary Stadium; Referee: Slobodan Petrovic

16 February 2022	Żebbuġ Rangers (2)	0–2	St. Andrews (2)	Ħamrun
21:00 CEST			Miguel D'Alessandro 13'; Zak Muscat 78'	Stadium: Victor Tedesco Stadium; Referee: Darryl Agius

== Round Of 16 ==
The draw for the Round Of 32 and Round of 16 was held on 8 January 2021. The matches were played during the week on 15 and 16 of March 2022. In the Round Of 16 there are 11 clubs from Maltese Premier League and 5 clubs from Maltese Challenge League left.

15 March 2022	Floriana (1)	2–0	St. George's (2)	Ta' Qali
17:00 CEST	Matheus Freitas C Da Silva 48' (o.g.); Emiliano Callegari 82'			Stadium: Centenary Stadium; Referee: Daniel Portelli

15 March 2022	Gżira United (1)	3–1	Gudja United (1)	Paola
17:00 CEST	Maxuell Maia 15'; Jefferson De Assis 29'; Gabriel Bohrer 63'		Aidan Jake Friggieri 39'	Stadium: Tony Bezzina Stadium; Referee: Slobodan Petrovic

15 March 2022	Birkirkara (1)	0–0 (a.e.t.) (3–1 p)	Mosta (1)	Ta' Qali
17:00 CEST				Stadium: Ta' Qali National Stadium; Referee: Philip Farrugia

15 March 2022	Tarxien Rainbows (2)	1–5	Valletta (1)	Ta' Qali
20:30 CEST	Saturday Nanapere 51'		Promise Oluwatobi Emmanuel David 5', 62'; Eslit Sala 27'; Kevin Tulimieri 84'; Ivan Curjuric 70'	Stadium: Centenary Stadium; Referee: Emanuel Grech

15 March 2022	Żejtun Corinthians (2)	1–2	Hibernians (1)	Paola
20:30 CEST	Samba Tounkara 44'		Jake Grech 83'; Hugo Filipe Da Costa Oliveira 89'	Stadium: Tony Bezzina Stadium; Referee: Alex Johnson

15 March 2022	Balzan (1)	1–1 (a.e.t.) (1–4 p)	Ħamrun Spartans (1)	Ta' Qali
20:30 CEST	Bojan Kaljevic 116'		Faissal El Bakhtaoui 105+1'	Stadium: Ta' Qali National Stadium; Referee: Andrea Sciriha

16 March 2022	St. Andrews (2)	1–2	Santa Lucia (1)	Ta' Qali
17:00 CEST	Ian Azzopardi 17'		Alan Da Silva Souza 116'; Vito Plut 31'	Stadium: Centenary Stadium; Referee: Glen Tonna

16 March 2022	Sliema Wanderers (1)	1–2 (a.e.t.)	Marsaxlokk (2)	Ta' Qali
20:30 CEST	Jake Engerer 28'		Augusto Rene' Caseres 3'; Xuan Cappellino 95'	Stadium: Centenary Stadium; Referee: Fyodor Zammit

== Quarter-finals ==
The draw for the Quarter-finals and Semi-finals was held on 5 March 2022. The matches played on 16 and 18 of April 2022. In the Quarter-finals there are 7 clubs from Maltese Premier League and 1 club from Maltese Challenge League left. Three matches (Except Gżira United vs Santa Lucia) were Live on TVMNews+

16 April 2022	Marsaxlokk (2)	0–3	Valletta (1)	Ta' Qali
14:00 CEST			Eslit Sala 5'; Promise Oluwatobi Emmanuel David 19'; Andrea Zammit 79'	Stadium: Ta' Qali National Stadium; Referee: Glen Tonna

16 April 2022	Ħamrun Spartans (1)	1–2 (a.e.t.)	Hibernians (1)	Ta' Qali
17:30 CEST	Jorge Ailton Soares 26'		Alvaro Muniz Cegarra 45'; Jake Grech 113'	Stadium: Ta' Qali National Stadium; Referee: Fyodor Zammit

18 April 2022	Gżira United (1)	0–1 (a.e.t.)	Santa Lucia (1)	Paola
19:00 CEST			Lorenzo Yoel Soares Fonseca 103'	Stadium: Tony Bezzina Stadium; Referee: Emanuel Grech

18 April 2022	Floriana (1)	3–1	Birkirkara (1)	Ta' Qali
19:00 CEST	Kemar Reid 53'; Andrei Ciolacu 83'; Jan Busuttil 85'		Yannick Yankam 64'	Stadium: Ta' Qali National Stadium; Referee: Philip Farrugia

== Semi-finals ==
The draw for the Quarter-finals and Semi-finals was held on 5 March 2022. The matches will be played on 10 and 11 of May 2022. In the Semi-finals there are 4 clubs left. All from Maltese Premier League. Both Semi-final matches were Live on TVMNews+

10 May 2022	Santa Lucia (1)	0–1	Valletta (1)	Ta' Qali
19:30 CEST			Promise David 61'	Stadium: Ta' Qali National Stadium; Referee: Fyodor Zammit

11 May 2022	Floriana (1)	2–1	Hibernians (1)	Ta' Qali
19:30 CEST	Kemar Reid 27'; Jan Busuttil 45+3'		Wilfried Domoraud 87'	Stadium: Ta' Qali National Stadium; Referee: Ishmael Barbara

== Final ==
The final played on 15 May 2022.

Valletta reached their twenty-five Maltese FA Trophy finals having won it fourteen times. Floriana reached their thirty-two finals and had won it twenty times previously.

Valletta and Floriana have met together in Maltese FA Trophy final seven times before, having previously met in 1957, 1960, 1976, 1977, 1978, 1994 and 2011. When meeting in the finals, Valletta won three Times (1960, 1977 and 1978). Floriana won Four Times (1957, 1976, 1994 and 2011).

The last time Valletta and Floriana met together in the FA Trophy was the 2010–11 season in the final when Floriana beat Valletta by 1–0.

15 May 2022	Valletta (1)	1–2 (a.e.t.)	Floriana (1)	Ta' Qali
17:00 CEST	Mario Fontanella 52' (pen.)		Jan Busuttil 19'; Andrei Ciolacu 111'	Stadium: Ta' Qali National Stadium; Attendance: 6012; Referee: Matthew De Gabrielle

== Statistics ==
=== Top scorers ===
As of 11 May 2022

Rank	Player	Club	Goals
1	(Argentina) Xuan Cappellino	Marsaxlokk	4
1	(Brazil) Promise Oluwatobi Emmanuel David	Valletta	4
1	(Brazil) Renan Sgaria Farias	Żejtun Corinthians	4
3	(Serbia) Milan Đurić	Balzan	3
3	(Malta) Jake Grech	Hibernians	3
3	(Taiwan) William Donkin	Mosta	3
3	(Malta) Stefan Cassar	Nadur Youngsters	3
6	(Montenegro) Bojan Kaljevic	Balzan	2
6	(Jamaica) Kemar Reid	Floriana	2
6	(Venezuela) Donys Quintero	Fgura United	2
6	(Brazil) Jefferson Assis	Gżira United	2
6	(Brazil) Euller Da Silva Rodrigues	Kerċem Ajax	2
6	(Malta) Zachary Brincat	Mosta	2
6	(Malta) Jordi Parnis	Nadur Youngsters	2
6	(Curaçao) Meghon Davidy Aytron Valpoort	Santa Lucia	2
6	(Malta) Shaun Dimech	Valletta	2
6	(Croatia) Ivan Curjuric	Valletta	2
6	(Albania) Eslit Sala	Valletta	2
6	(Malta) Quincy Leslie Bregman	Vittoriosa Stars	2
6	(Nigeria) Haruna Shodija Shola	Xewkija Tigers	2
6	(Colombia) Miguel Perez Jimenez	Żebbuġ Rangers	2

== See also ==
- 2021–22 Maltese Premier League
