= 1934–35 Maltese FA Trophy =

Tournament details
- Country: Malta
- Dates: 20 April 1935 - 2 June 1935
- Teams: 10

Final positions
- Champions: Sliema Wanderers (1st title)
- Runners-up: Floriana

Tournament statistics
- Matches played: 9
- Goals scored: 40 (4.44 per match)
- Top goal scorer: Tony Nicholl (9 Goals)
- All statistics correct as of 23 October 2024.

The 1934–35 Maltese FA Trophy, was the 1st edition of the football cup competition, the FA Trophy.

== Preliminary round ==
Five preliminary round matches were played on 20, 27, and 28 April 1935.

20 April 1935	Sliema Rangers	2–1	Melita F.C.	Gżira
				Stadium: Empire Stadium

20 April 1935	St Joseph	4–1	Qormi St.George's	Gżira
				Stadium: Empire Stadium

27 April 1935	Floriana	3–1	Little St.George's	Gżira
				Stadium: Empire Stadium

28 April 1935	Sliema Wanderers	7–0	Marsa	Gżira
				Stadium: Empire Stadium

28 April 1935	Hibernians	3–0	Tigers F.C.	Gżira
				Stadium: Empire Stadium

== Semi-finals Play-Offs ==
18 May 1935	Hibernians	2–1	St Joseph	Gżira
				Stadium: Empire Stadium

== Semi-finals ==
Semi-final matches were played on 19 and 26 May 1935.

19 May 1935	Floriana	6–0	Sliema Rangers	Gżira
				Stadium: Empire Stadium

26 May 1935	Sliema Wanderers	4–1	Hibernians	Gżira
				Stadium: Empire Stadium

== Final ==
The final was played on 2 June 1935.

2 June 1935	Sliema Wanderers	4–0	Floriana	Gżira
				Stadium: Empire Stadium; Referee: Caswell
