= 2001–02 Maltese FA Trophy =

Tournament details
- Country: Malta

Final positions
- Champions: Birkirkara (1st title)
- Runners-up: Sliema Wanderers

The 2001–02 Maltese FA Trophy (known as the Rothmans Trophy for sponsorship reasons) was the 64th season since its establishment. The competition started on 23 December 2001 and ended on 23 May 2002 with the final, which Birkirkara won 1–0 against Sliema Wanderers.

== First round ==
Team 1	Score	Team 2
23 December 2001
Pietà Hotspurs	2–0	Xghajra Tornadoes
Gozo	0–1	Lija Athletic
Naxxar Lions	5–2	Qormi
St. Patrick	0–4	Hamrun Spartans
30 December 2001
Marsa	6–0	Balzan Youths
Marsaxlokk	1–3	Floriana
Rabat Ajax	2–1	Mqabba
St. Andrews	0–5	Mosta

== Second round ==
Team 1	Score	Team 2
3 April 2002
Rabat Ajax	0–4	Marsa
Naxxar Lions	5–1	Lija Athletic
10 April 2002
Mosta	1–2	Hamrun Spartans
Pietà Hotspurs	2–0	Floriana

== Quarter-finals ==
Team 1	Score	Team 2
11 May 2002
Sliema Wanderers	2–1	Pietà Hotspurs
Hibernians	3–1	Hamrun Spartans
12 May 2002
Birkirkara	4–0	Naxxar Lions
Marsa	1–3 (a.e.t.)	Valletta

== Semi-finals ==
16 May 2002	Valletta	2–5	Sliema Wanderers	Ta' Qali
	Laferla 25'; G. Agius 90+1'	Report	Dončić 68', 84', 90'; Turner 71' (pen.); Anonam 90+3'	Stadium: Ta' Qali National Stadium; Referee: Charles Agius

17 May 2002	Hibernians	0–1	Birkirkara	Ta' Qali
		Report	Nwoko 90+2'	Stadium: Ta' Qali National Stadium; Referee: Joe Attard

== Final ==
23 May 2002

Sliema Wanderers	0–1	Birkirkara
	Report	Calascione 45'

Ta' Qali National Stadium, Ta' Qali
Referee: Lorry Sammut
