= 2005–06 Maltese FA Trophy =

Tournament details
- Country: Malta

Final positions
- Champions: Hibernians (7th title)
- Runners-up: Floriana

The 2005–06 Maltese FA Trophy (known as U*BET FA Trophy for sponsorship reasons) was the 68th season since its establishment. The competition started on 5 November 2005 and ended on 26 May 2006 with the final, which Hibernians won 1-0 against Floriana.

== First round ==
| Team 1 | Score | Team 2 |
|---|---|---|
5 November 2005
| Marsaxlokk | 3–0 | Lija Athletic |
| St. George's | 1–2 | Hamrun Spartans |
6 November 2005
| St. Patrick | 3–1 | Mosta |
| Floriana | 3–1 | Tarxien Rainbows |
12 November 2005
| Pietà Hotspurs | 0–2 | San Gwann |
| Mqabba | 0–3 | Msida St. Joseph |
13 November 2005
| St. Andrews | 0–1 | Marsa |
| Naxxar Lions | 0–0 (a.e.t.) (1–3 p) | Senglea Athletic |

== Second round ==
| Team 1 | Score | Team 2 |
|---|---|---|
18 February 2006
| Marsaxlokk | 2–0 | Marsa |
| Hamrun Spartans | 3–2 | St. Patrick |
19 February 2006
| Floriana | 4–0 | Senglea Athletic |
| Msida St. Joseph | 2–1 (a.e.t.) | San Gwann |

== Quarter-finals ==
| Team 1 | Score | Team 2 |
|---|---|---|
8 April 2006
| Hibernians | 1–0 | Hamrun Spartans |
| Marsaxlokk | 0–2 | Sliema Wanderers |
9 April 2006
| Valletta | 0–2 (a.e.t.) | Birkirkara |
| Floriana | 2–0 | Msida St. Joseph |

== Semi-finals ==
| 19 May 2006 | Floriana | 2–0 | Sliema Wanderers | Ta' Qali |
| | Cilia 71', 86' | Report | | Stadium: Ta' Qali National Stadium; Referee: Clayton Pisani |

| 20 May 2006 | Birkirkara | 0–1 | Hibernians | Ta' Qali |
| | | Report | Agius 68' | Stadium: Ta' Qali National Stadium; Referee: Adrian Azzopardi |

== Final ==
26 May 2006

| Floriana | 0–1 | Hibernians |
|---|---|---|
| | Report | Doda 44' |

Ta' Qali National Stadium, Ta' Qali
Referee: Lorry Sammut
