= Tony Nicholl =

Maltese footballer (1884–1927)

Personal information
- Full name: Tony Nicholl
- Date of birth: 1 January 1916
- Place of birth: Sliema, Malta
- Date of death: 11 March 1999 (aged 83)
- Place of death: Malta
- Position: Forward

Youth career
- 1929–1932: Sliema Wanderers

Senior career*
| Years | Team | Apps | (Gls) |
| 1932–1957 | Sliema Wanderers | 200 | (172) |

International career
| 1933–1956 | Malta | 48 | (34) |
- * Club domestic league appearances and goals

Tony Nicholl (1 January 1916 – 11 March 1999) was a Maltese footballer who played as a striker. Tony Nicholl scored 263 goals in 302 games in his 25-year career in Malta, he won 30 trophies during his time in Malta and was the league's top-scorer on 7 occasions.

== Club career ==
Tony played for the Wanderers for 25 years and though many clubs wished him to don their colours, he remained loyal to his town's club. However, he played twice as a guest for Valletta F.C., but those were competitions which the Wanderers did not take part in. Even foreign clubs requested his services. Charlton Athletic, Southampton and an even the Argentina squad wanted him in their ranks but Tony did not want to leave the country because of his mother. Tony's level of football was so high that when the Swedes of IFK Goteborg visited Malta, a high official remarked that if Tony was a Swede, he would be a natural choice in their national team.

== Career statistics ==
Appearances and goals by club, season, and competition. Only official games are included in this table.
| Club | Season | League | | FA Trophy | | Cassar Cup | | Scicluna Cup | | Total | |
| Club | Season | Apps | Goals | Apps | Goals | Apps | Goals | Apps | Goals | Apps | Goals |
|---|---|---|---|---|---|---|---|---|---|---|---|
| Sliema Wanderers | 1932-1933 | 0 | 0 | 0 | 0 | 0 | 0 | 0 | 0 | 0 | 0 |
| Sliema Wanderers | 1933-1934 | 0 | 0 | 0 | 0 | 0 | 0 | 0 | 0 | 0 | 0 |
| Sliema Wanderers | 1934-1935 | 6 | 12 | 3 | 9 | 0 | 0 | 0 | 0 | 9 | 21 |
| Sliema Wanderers | 1936-1937 | 0 | 0 | 0 | 0 | 0 | 0 | 0 | 0 | 0 | 0 |
| Sliema Wanderers | 1937-1938 | 6 | 6 | 0 | 0 | 2 | 2 | 0 | 0 | 8 | 8 |
| Sliema Wanderers | 1938-1939 | 6 | 8 | 0 | 0 | 0 | 0 | 0 | 0 | 6 | 8 |
| Sliema Wanderers | 1939-1940 | 11 | 19 | 4 | 15 | 0 | 0 | 0 | 0 | 15 | 34 |
| Sliema Wanderers | 1940-1941 | 0 | 0 | 0 | 0 | 0 | 0 | 0 | 0 | 0 | 0 |
| Sliema Wanderers | 1941-1942 | 0 | 0 | 0 | 0 | 0 | 0 | 0 | 0 | 0 | 0 |
| Sliema Wanderers | 1942-1943 | 0 | 0 | 0 | 0 | 0 | 0 | 0 | 0 | 0 | 0 |
| Sliema Wanderers | 1943-1944 | 0 | 0 | 0 | 0 | 0 | 0 | 0 | 0 | 0 | 0 |
| Sliema Wanderers | 1944-1945 | 3 | 6 | 0 | 0 | 0 | 0 | 0 | 0 | 3 | 6 |
| Sliema Wanderers | 1945-1946 | 12 | 22 | 3 | 5 | 0 | 0 | 0 | 0 | 15 | 25 |
| Sliema Wanderers | 1946-1947 | 0 | 0 | 0 | 0 | 0 | 0 | 0 | 0 | 0 | 0 |
| Sliema Wanderers | 1947-1948 | 0 | 0 | 0 | 0 | 0 | 0 | 0 | 0 | 0 | 0 |
| Sliema Wanderers | 1948-1949 | 0 | 0 | 3 | 4 | 0 | 0 | 0 | 0 | 3 | 4 |
| Sliema Wanderers | 1949-1950 | 0 | 0 | 0 | 0 | 0 | 0 | 0 | 0 | 0 | 0 |
| Sliema Wanderers | 1950-1951 | 0 | 0 | 2 | 4 | 0 | 0 | 0 | 0 | 2 | 4 |
| Sliema Wanderers | 1951-1952 | 0 | 0 | 0 | 0 | 0 | 0 | 0 | 0 | 0 | 0 |
| Sliema Wanderers | 1952-1953 | 0 | 0 | 0 | 0 | 0 | 0 | 0 | 0 | 0 | 0 |
| Sliema Wanderers | 1953-1954 | 14 | 12 | 0 | 0 | 0 | 0 | 0 | 0 | 14 | 12 |
| Sliema Wanderers | 1955-1955 | 0 | 0 | 0 | 0 | 1 | 0 | 0 | 0 | 1 | 0 |
| Sliema Wanderers | 1955-1956 | 0 | 0 | 3 | 3 | 0 | 0 | 0 | 0 | 0 | 0 |
| Sliema Wanderers | 1956-1957 | 0 | 0 | 0 | 0 | 0 | 0 | 0 | 0 | 0 | 0 |
| Sliema Wanderers | Total | 57+ | 83+ | 18+ | 40+ | 3+ | 2+ | 0 | 0 | 78+ | 125+ |

== Style of play ==
Nicholl was extremely versatile and able to perform well in any position. He played on the attacking flanks, in a central striking role and, before he retired, also in the middle of a defensive pack.

== Honours ==
- Maltese Premier League: 1932–33, 1933–34, 1935–36, 1937–38, 1938–39, 1939–40, 1948–49, 1953–54, 1955–56, 1956–57
- Maltese FA Trophy: 1934–35, 1935–36, 1936–37, 1939–40, 1947–48, 1950–51, 1951–52, 1955–56
- Cassar Cup: 1933–34, 1934–35, 1937–38, 1938–39, 1945–46, 1955–56, 1956–57
- Scicluna Cup: 1949–50, 1950–51, 1953–54, 1954–55, 1955–56, 1956–57

== Personal life ==
The youngest of 23 siblings, born in 1916 to Annie, née Camilleri, and Samuel Nicholl, Tony started his footballing days in Sliema's Primary School. Family relocation then took him temporarily to Marsa school.

In his childhood, Tony was already a football fanatic. He used to play with friends in the many fields around Sliema at the time. Once he had a small accident while playing and hurt his foot. The pain increased and a medical doctor told his parents that the only solution was amputation. But his eldest brother Joe, Sliema Wanderers goalkeeper, asked the club doctor to visit his youngest brother. The medic massaged the child's foot and in a few days the pain had gone.

Tony was involved in a shooting accident when someone shot at his feet a number of times in Balluta Bay. Though many supporters thought the incident had football rivalry behind it, the investigations found out that the motive had nothing to do with the game. He was injured in both feet and his future in football was in danger. But fortunately he resumed playing and his career continued for a further 11 years. His nephew Sammy Nicholl also played for Sliema Wanderers and the national team.
