= Kemar Reid =

Maltese footballer (born 1994)

Personal information
- Full name: Kemar David Reid
- Date of birth: 15 August 1994 (age 32)
- Place of birth: Jamaica
- Position: Attacking midfielder

Team information
- Current team: Birkirkara
- Number: 9

Youth career
- Phoenix Academy

Senior career*
Years	Team	Apps	(Gls)
2015–2016	Sporting Central Academy	5	(5)
2016–2017	Mosta	9	(3)
2017–2020	St. Andrews	46	(12)
2020–2021	Żejtun Corinthians	19	(8)
2021–2022	Sirens	15	(6)
2022–2024	Floriana	65	(21)
2025–	Birkirkara	41	(7)

International career^{‡}
2023–	Malta	10	(0)
- * Club domestic league appearances and goals as of 18 May 2026 ‡ National team caps and goals as of 20:45, 9 October 2025

Kemar David Reid (born 15 August 1994) is a professional footballer who plays as an attacking midfielder for Maltese Premier League club Birkirkara. Born in Jamaica, he plays for the Malta national team.

== Club career ==
Reid began his playing career in Jamaica with Sporting Central Academy in 2015, before moving to Malta with Mosta in 2016. After one season there, he moved to St. Andrews where he played for 3 seasons. On 23 June 2020, he transferred to Żejtun Corinthians for one season. He followed that with a stint with Sirens on 10 August 2021. On 19 January 2022, he moved to Floriana. He helped Floriana win the 2021–22 Maltese FA Trophy.

== International career ==
Born in Jamaica, Reid was naturalised as a Maltese citizen on 27 October 2023 after 7 years in the country. He was called up to the Malta national team for a set of UEFA Euro 2024 qualifying matches in November 2023. He made his international debut with Malta in a 2–0 loss against England on 17 November 2023.

== Honours ==
Floriana

- Maltese FA Trophy: 2021–22
