= Empire Stadium =

Empire Stadium was the name of three stadiums:

- Empire Stadium (Vancouver), Vancouver, Canada, now closed
- Empire Stadium (Gżira), Malta, now closed
- Wembley Stadium (1923), Wembley, England, originally called Empire Exhibition Stadium later renamed Wembley Stadium, replaced in 2007 by a new Wembley Stadium
