= Mile End Sports Ground =

Former football stadium in Malta

- Interactive map of Mile End Sports Ground
- Location: Blata l-Bajda, Hamrun, Malta
- Coordinates: 35.887490°N 14.494421°E
- Capacity: ~10,000 people
- Surface: Gravel
- Field size: 115 yds x 75 yds

Construction
- Groundbreaking: 27 September 1911
- Opened: 12 January 1912
- Closed: ~1938
- Demolished: Yes
- Architect: F.M. Caruana

The Mile End Sports Ground was a football stadium located in Blata l-Bajda, Hamrun, Malta, just across the present Victor Tedesco Stadium.

Between its opening in 1912 and the inauguration of the Empire Stadium in Gżira, the Mile End SG was considered to be the 'Mecca of Maltese Football'. During the said period the stadium used to host all the important matches of the Maltese civilian football calendar, particularly matches of the Football Championship.

== History ==
The stadium is considered to be the first proper football stadium in Malta for civilian use. Indeed, until then, the important matches of Maltese civilian football competitions were held at the Lyceum Football Ground in Marsa and subsequently the National Ground, next to the Ta' Braxia Cemetery in Pieta. However, in reality, these two stadiums were simply open fields which were turned into makeshift stadiums. Indeed, the field at the National Ground was even sloping.

Construction of the stadium started on 27 September 1911 under the supervision of F.M. Caruana. The ground was highly uneven and therefore extensive work had to be carried out to level the ground. The Mile End SG was officially opened on 12 January 1912 with a friendly match between the King's Own Malta Regiment and the Army Cup Winners, the Northamptonshire Regiment. The latter won the match three-goals to one.

The stadium hosted all the important matches of the Maltese civilian football calendar, starting from the 1911–12 Maltese Premier League. However, by the end of the World War One in 1919, the stadium fell into a state of disrepair. This paved the way for the construction of the new stadium, namely the Empire Stadium in Gzira. Once the Empire Stadium was inaugurated for the 1922/23 season, the Empire Stadium replaced the Mile End SG as the main venue of Maltese football, and the Mile End SG ended up hosting the Second Division league and lower leagues.

The stadium is touted to have been closed in 1938 following the conclusion of the 1937/38 season. However, records show that the stadium was still in use by at least 1941. In any case, the Mile End SG was eventually demolished and in its place these days there is the San Gorg Preca College.

== Layout ==
The stadium had a capacity of in excess of 10,000 people. The playing pitch was 75 yards wide and 115 yards long and its surface was covered with gravel. For some time there were plans to lay natural turf on the surface but, due to the dry and warm weather conditions prevalent in Malta, the plans never materialised.

The stadium consisted of a small enclosure on Mile End Street surrounded by a stone wall, which also extended to cover both sides of it. On the other three sides, the Mile End SG had a row of wooden benches and the entire stadium was completely surrounded by wire fence mounted on forty-eight poles measuring 16 metres high.
