= Matteo Cardinali =

Italian footballer (born 2001)

Personal information
- Date of birth: 28 June 2001 (age 25)
- Place of birth: Rome, Italy
- Height: 1.90 m (6 ft 3 in)
- Position: Goalkeeper

Team information
- Current team: Hibernians
- Number: 45

Youth career
- Roma

Senior career*
Years	Team	Apps	(Gls)
2018–2021	Roma	0	(0)
2020–2021	→ Matelica (loan)	30	(0)
2021–2025	Latina	72	(0)
2025–2026	Cittadella	2	(0)
2026	Reggiana	0	(0)
2026–	Hibernians	3	(0)

International career^{‡}
2016–2017	Italy U16	5	(0)
2017	Italy U17	1	(0)
- * Club domestic league appearances and goals as of 28 August 2026 ‡ National team caps and goals as of 20 August 2017

Matteo Cardinali (born 28 June 2001) is an Italian professional footballer who plays as a goalkeeper for Maltese Premier League club Hibernians.

== Club career ==
Born in Rome, Cardinali started his career in local club Roma. In June 2018, he was scouted by English clubs Liverpool and Arsenal.

He was promoted to first team for the 2018–19 season. In July 2020 he extended his contract with the club.

On 12 August 2020, Cardinali was loaned to Serie C club Matelica. He made his professional debut on 27 September against Triestina.

On 19 August 2021, he signed with Serie C club Latina.

On 22 January 2025, Cardinali joined Cittadella in Serie B.

On 30 January 2026, Cardinali joined Reggiana in Serie B.

== International career ==
Cardinali was a youth international for Italy.
