= Pablo Sánchez (footballer, born 1995) =

Spanish footballer

Personal information
- Full name: Pablo Sánchez Niño
- Date of birth: 20 October 1995 (age 31)
- Place of birth: London, England
- Position: Goalkeeper

Team information
- Current team: Hibernians
- Number: 1

Youth career
- Cimiano
- –2012: Giana Erminio

Senior career*
| Years | Team | Apps | (Gls) |
| 2012–2019 | Giana Erminio | 81 | (0) |
| 2019–2020 | Agropoli | 22 | (0) |
| 2020–2023 | Hamrun Spartans | 7 | (0) |
| 2024– | Hibernians | 14 | (0) |
- * Club domestic league appearances and goals as of 26 June 2025

Pablo Sánchez Niño (born 20 October 1995) is an English professional footballer who plays as a goalkeeper for Hibernians

== Club career ==
On 21 February 2019, he was released from his contract with Giana Erminio by mutual consent.

== Personal life ==
Pablo was born in London, England of Spanish parents. Pablo lived for many years in Milan (Italy) where be played for most of his youth career.
