= Manoel Island Football Ground =

- Manoel Island Upper Ground
- Interactive map of Manoel Island Football Ground
- Location: Manoel Island, Gżira, Malta
- Coordinates: 35.903893°N 14.502475°E
- Owner: Government of Malta
- Operator: Gzira United

Construction
- Demolished: No but dilapidated

The Manoel Island Football Ground was a stadium in Manoel Island, Gżira, Malta. It was used mostly for football matches.

== History ==
During the summer of 1965, the Malta Football Association together with the affiliated clubs decided not to play at Empire Stadium following an argument with the management over the distribution of gate-money. Following lengthy discussions, the Association decided to transfer all football activities for the 1965/66 football season to the Manoel Island Football Ground. The stadium was regarded as unsuitable to host league football matches as the lack of security at the ground made it easy for the fans to cause trouble. This caused a number of matches to be abandoned and for the said season to go down in history "as one of the most ill-fated competitions in the history of Maltese football".

In the following season, football returned to the Empire Stadium as the Association managed to clinch a new agreement with the operators of The Stadium.

== Future ==
The site has been subject to a proposed development by local property consortium, MIDI plc, for a number of years. Gzira United, who have been running the premises since the early 1990s, expressed the willingness to redevelop the clubs premises, including the stadium, on a number of times, but the issue of the legal title over the area remains a stumbling block for the club.

== Trivia ==
Besides the Manoel Island Football Ground, Manoel Island is also home to another football pitch. This is commonly referred to as the Gzira football pitch and nowadays is used to host other events, such as the annual Luna Park and, more recently, the World Cup Village.

The existence of the Gzira football pitch, which is situated right next to the bridge linking the Manoel Island with the mainland may also explain why the Manoel island Football Ground is sometimes referred to as the Manoel Island Upper Ground.

== Notable events ==
On February 14, 1966, the Malta national football team defeated the Libya national football team 1-0 in the first and only international match at the Manoel Island Football Ground. Edward Aquilina won the match for the Maltese with a goal in the second half.

== See also ==
- List of football stadiums in Malta
