= Michael Galea (footballer) =

Maltese footballer

Personal information
- Full name: Michael Galea
- Date of birth: 1 February 1979 (age 47)
- Place of birth: Malta
- Height: 1.80 m (5 ft 11 in)
- Position: Striker

Team information
- Current team: Melita

Youth career
- Melita

Senior career*
Years	Team	Apps	(Gls)
1997–2011	Birkirkara	334	(170)
2011–2012	Melita	0	(0)

International career^{‡}
2000–2004	Malta	5	(0)
- * Club domestic league appearances and goals as of 25 November 2010 ‡ National team caps and goals as of 25 November 2010

Michael Galea (born 1 February 1979 in Malta) is a retired Maltese footballer who started playing for Maltese First Division side Melita and spent most of his career with Birkirkara, where he played as a striker.

== Playing career ==
Galea started his career with Melita, before being transferred to Birkirkara FC during the 1997–1998 aged 18. He scored 14 goals in the 1997–1998 season. During its debut in the UEFA Competitions, Birkirkara was eliminated by the Slovakia side, FC Spartak Trnava 5–1, in which Galea scored Birkirkara's only goal.

During the 1998–1999 season Galea scored nine goals. In 1999-2000 he scored 14 goals which contributed to the 'Stripes' winning its first Premier League, on the 50th anniversary of the club.

In 2000-2001 Galea scored 21 goals for Birkirkara. In 2001–20 he scored 15 goals and the team won the Rothmans Trophy.

In 2005 the team won the Rothmans Trophy, beating Msida Saint-Joseph 2-1 in the final, Galea's scoring both goals.

In 2005–2006, Birkirkara won the Premier League title, with Galea as captain finishing the season as the club's best scorer with 18 goals.

In 2006–2007, Galea suffered an injury which kept him away from playing for almost a year.

In 2007-2008 Galea scored six goals and was the match-winner in the U*BET FA Trophy against Hamrun. He scored two goals when the team beat the 'Spartans' 2–1.

In 2008-2009 Galea scored seven goals for Birkirkara, which qualified to the 1st round of the Europa League.

In the following season, Birkirkara won its third Premier League title. Galea finished the season as the second best club scorer with 14 goals. Galea's contract expired at the end of the 2010–2011 season and he announced his retirement on 19 June.

== International career ==
=== Malta ===
Galea made five appearances for the senior Malta national football team, with his debut coming in a friendly against Andorra on 8 February 2000.

== League career statistics ==
Season	Team	Matches	Goals
1997–1998	Birkirkara	25	14
1998–1999	Birkirkara	25	9
1999–2000	Birkirkara	28	14
2000–2001	Birkirkara	26	21
2001–2002	Birkirkara	26	15
2002–2003	Birkirkara	27	18
2003–2004	Birkirkara	22	14
2004–2005	Birkirkara	21	14
2005–2006	Birkirkara	26	19
2006–2007	Birkirkara	15	6
2007–2008	Birkirkara	19	6
2008–2009	Birkirkara	26	7
2009–2010	Birkirkara	28	14
2010–2011	Birkirkara	20	6
2011–2012	Melita	0	0
