= Orosco Anonam =

Maltese footballer

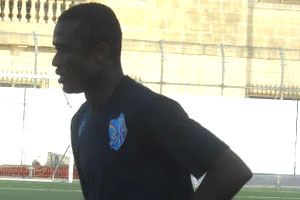
- Anonam in 2010

Personal information
- Date of birth: 15 June 1979 (age 47)
- Place of birth: Nigeria
- Positions: Defender; midfielder

Senior career*
Years	Team	Apps	(Gls)
1998–2000	Naxxar Lions	40	(20)
2000–2008	Sliema Wanderers	163	(48)
2001–2002	→Vasas SC (loan)	2	(0)
2002	→APOEL (loan)	0	(0)
2008–2010	Floriana	46	(9)
2010–2016	Tarxien Rainbows	52	(2)

International career^{‡}
2005	Malta	4	(0)

Managerial career
- 2009–2010: Floriana (assistant manager)
- 2009: Floriana (caretaker)
- * Club domestic league appearances and goals as of 8 May 2012 ‡ National team caps and goals as of 31 July 2010

Orosco Anonam (born 15 June 1979) is a former professional footballer who last played for Maltese side Tarxien Rainbows. Born in Nigeria, he represented the Malta national team.

== Playing career ==
=== Naxxar Lions ===
Orosco Anonam was born in Nigeria, but moved to Malta at an early age and began his playing career with Naxxar Lions of the Maltese Premier League. His first season with the club was the 1998–99 season. He found himself a regular in the team and 21 appearances, and scored seven goals in his debut season, as Naxxar Lions recorded a 6th-place finish in the Maltese Premier League.

Anonam continued to impress at Naxxar Lions, and went into the 1999–00 season hoping to help the club maintain a respectable league position. He helped Naxxar Lions finish in 7th position in the Maltese Premier League that season, making 19 appearances, and scoring a very impressive 13 goals.

=== Sliema Wanderers ===
Following a string on impressive performances for Naxxar Lions, Orosco left the club and joined fellow Maltese Premier League outfit Sliema Wanderers for the 2000–01 season. In his first season with Sliema Wanderers, Anonam made 26 appearances and scored 22 goals, helping his new club to a place finish in the Maltese Premier League.

For the 2001–02 season, Orosco was loaned out to Hungarian outfit Vasas SC. The stint was only a brief one, with Anonam making just two appearances, but failed to score. He returned to Sliema Wanderers for the remainder of the 2000–01 season, he went on to make 24 appearances and scored seven goals, helping Sliema Wanderers to a 2nd-place finish in the Maltese Premier League.

Anonam went into the 2002–03 season, making another loan move overseas, this time joining Cypriot side APOEL, the stint lasted longer than the previous one. Orosco again returned to Sliema Wanderers for the remainder of the 2002–03 season, he went on to make 15 appearances and scored six goals, helping Sliema Wanderers to a 3rd-place finish in the Maltese Premier League.

Orosco went into the 2003–04 season hoping to win some silverware with Sliema Wanderers, Anonam achieved this as the club recorded a 1st-place finish in the Maltese Premier League. Over the course of the season Orosco made 24 appearances and scored six goals.

For the 2004–05 season, Orosco and Sliema Wanderers continued to emulate the successes of previous season. Anonam made 21 appearances and scored four goals, as Sliema Wanderers completed the domestic double, finishing in 1st position in the Maltese Premier League and winning the U*Bet FA Trophy.

Anonam and Sliema Wanderers went into the 2005–06 looking to add to their previous successes, however Anonam did not have a great deal of impact on the season as the club failed to retain the Maltese Premier League title, which Birkirkara went on to win by two points, with Sliema Wanderers recording a 2nd-place finish, Orosco made 11 appearances, but failed to score during the season.

Orosco went on to the 2006–07 hoping to win more trophies, however Sliema Wanderers recorded another 2nd-place finish, but were beaten comprehensively by Marsaxlokk, who won the title by 11 points. Anonam made 19 appearances and scored two goals.

The 2007–08 season turned out to be Orosco's last season with Sliema Wanderers. The club had a disappointing season by their own high standards, finishing in 4th position in the Maltese Premier League. Orosco notched up 23 appearances and scored three goals, throughout the season.

=== Floriana ===
Orosco Anonam joined Maltese Premier League rivals Floriana from Sliema Wanderers just before the start of the 2008–09 season. Floriana hoped that signing Anonam would boost the club's attacking line up, although he primarily took up a role of playing just the front man. Orosco added experience and talent to a relatively young side and showed great versatility that would pay dividends to him and the team throughout season. In his debut season with Floriana, Orosco made 25 appearances and scored 7 goals, as Floriana recorded a place finish in the Maltese Premier League.

The 2009–10 season began with the appointment of Irish manager Roddy Collins as the new manager of Floriana. He found himself using Orosco as a central defender, mainly due to injuries and a shortage in experienced players to play the position.

Anonam's excellent versatility continued to show. On the opening day of the season, Orosco scored a fantastic goal, when he hit a cracking drive from the edge of the box against Qormi, capping off an impressive first competitive outing in defence.

In October 2009, assistant manager Tony Alamango left the club. Orosco was appointed as the club's new assistant manager, as well as still continuing in a playing capacity. Manager, Roddy Collins left the club in January 2010, with Anonam been given the role of the club's caretaker manager, until Serbian Zoran Popovic was re-appointed as the club's manager. Orosco returned to his role of player-assistant manager.

The 2009–10 season proved to be another difficult one for Floriana, with the club slipping into the relegation pool, but Orosco helped the club finish safely in 7th position. Over the season, Anonam played 21 games and scored two goals.

=== Tarxien Rainbows ===
On 24 July 2010, Orosco Anonam left Floriana and joined fellow Maltese Premier League team Tarxien Rainbows, signing a two-year deal with the club.

== Honours ==
=== Sliema Wanderers ===
Winner

- 2002–03, 2003–04, 2004–05 Maltese Premier League
- 2004 Maltese Cup
