= Chris Oretan =

Nigerian footballer

Personal information
- Full name: Christopher Olusola Oretan
- Date of birth: 8 September 1980 (age 46)
- Place of birth: Nigeria
- Positions: Midfielder; forward

Senior career*
Years	Team	Apps	(Gls)
1998-2000	Naxxar Lions F.C.		
2000-2003	Valletta F.C.		
2003/2004	NK Slaven Belupo		
- Doxa Drama F.C.
2004/2005	Valletta F.C.		
2005/2006	BV Cloppenburg		
2006-2008	1. FC Bad Kötzting	60	(9)
2008-2009	TSV Großhadern	34	(5)
2009-2012/13	SV Heimstetten	77	(15)
- * Club domestic league appearances and goals

Christopher Olusola Oretan (born 8 September 1980 in Nigeria) is a Nigerian retired footballer.

== Career ==
In 1998, Oretan signed for Naxxar Lions in Malta before joining another Maltese club, Valletta, where he stayed from 2000 to 2003.

For 2003/04, he signed for Croatian top flight side NK Slaven Belupo, but soon left due to a dispute with the head coach. From there, Oretan joined Doxa Dramas in Greece. However, he later had to leave because they were going bankrupt.

For the second half of 2004/05, he returned to Malta with Valletta.

After that, Oretan played for German lower league teams BV Cloppenburg, Bad Kötzting, TSV Großhadern, and SV Heimstetten.
