= Empire Stadium (Gżira) =

Maltese soccer stadium

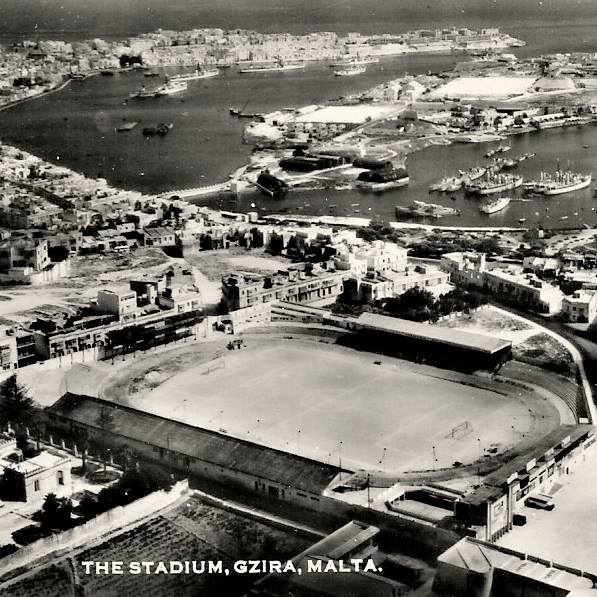
- Gżira Stadium in the 1950s
- Interactive map of Empire Stadium
- Location: Gżira, Malta
- Coordinates: 35.90255°N 14.492745°E
- Owner: Testaferrata heirs
- Capacity: 30,000

Construction
- Built: 4 November 1922
- Opened: 1922
- Renovated: 1933, 1951
- Closed: 1981
- Demolished: No, but dilapidated

The Empire Stadium, also known as the Gżira Stadium or just The Stadium, was a multi-purpose stadium in Gżira, Malta. It was used mostly for football matches and hosted the home matches of the Maltese national football team, including the very first international match for Malta in 1957 against Austria. It also hosted the final of the Maltese Cup. The stadium was able to hold 30,000 spectators and originally opened in 1922. It was notorious for its sandy pitch. The stadium hosted its final game in 1981, being replaced by the modern Ta' Qali Stadium.

== History ==
The stadium opened on 4 November 1922. The ground was inaugurated with an exhibition match between Malta Football Association (MFA) XI and HMS Ajax. The Ground is where during the First World War the RAF had its balloon station and was leased by Pietro Paolo Testaferrata Moroni Viani (Baron Gomerino) to his brother in law Carmelo 'Meme' Scicluna. With the opening of the Empire Sports Ground, the Mile End Sports Ground lost its importance. The Mile End Sports Ground was situated near Spencer's Monument at Blata l-Bajda (limits of Hamrun) and was Malta's main football stadium between 1912 and 1922.

Early in the 1930s, Scicluna signed a contract with a British company to hold greyhound racing at the Empire Sports Ground. During the summer of 1933 the Sports Ground had to be pulled down. Work on a new stadium started immediately and the MFA First Division had to be postponed for some months. Although not completed, the Empire Stadium was officially inaugurated on 24 December 1933 with a friendly match between Malta XI and SK Viktoria Plzeň of Czechoslovakia. Other sports activities such as boxing, athletics, and motor-cycling were also held at the Empire Stadium.

An important event organized on a regular basis at the Empire Stadium was the Christmas Tournament, in which foreign teams played friendly matches against local teams during the Christmas holidays. Malta's first-ever international match, a 2-3 defeat to Austria, was played on 24 February 1957 at the Empire Stadium.

League Champions Hibernians (European Cup) and FA Trophy Winners Floriana (Cup Winners' Cup) were the first teams to take part in European Competitions in the season 1961/62. After suffering a 0-5 defeat in the first leg, Hibernians lost 1-2 to Swiss champions Servette at the Empire Stadium. Ujpest of Hungary qualified to the next round on a 15-4 aggregate score after beating Floriana FC 2-5 in the first leg. Leeds United (England), Ipswich Town (England), Manchester United (England), Juventus (Italy), Internazionale (Italy), Celtic (Scotland), Real Madrid (Spain) and Barcelona (Spain) were some of the teams involved in European Competitions matches played at the Empire Stadium.

When the lease expired the owners took over the management. The owners changed the name of the ground to the Stadium and made it clear that they did not want to run it at a loss. The end of the lease saw a new cup called the Testaferrata Cup replacing the Scicluna Cup.

During the summer of 1965, the MFA together with the affiliated clubs decided not to play at the Stadium following an argument with the management over the distribution of gate-money. Following lengthy discussions, the MFA decided to transfer all football activities for season 1965/66 to Manoel Island Football Ground. Everything returned to normal during the summer of 1966 when a solution was found. Football started to be held at The Stadium again in season 1966/67.

During the 1970s the MFA was involved in a heated dispute with the Maltese government over the administration of the game. In an attempt to boost the local game the government started to organize football leagues at the Marsa Sports Ground without consulting the MFA. In the meantime the government officially inaugurated the newly built National Stadium (Ta' Qali) on 14 December 1980 leaving the MFA out of the celebrations. Finally both parties managed to reach an agreement during the month of November 1981 following lengthy discussions. Football was finally transferred to the newly built turf stadium of Ta' Qali. Sunday 29 November 1981 was the last time that The Stadium hosted a football match.

The area of the Stadium, which is owned by the heirs of Baron Testaferrata, is today valued at over €30 million.

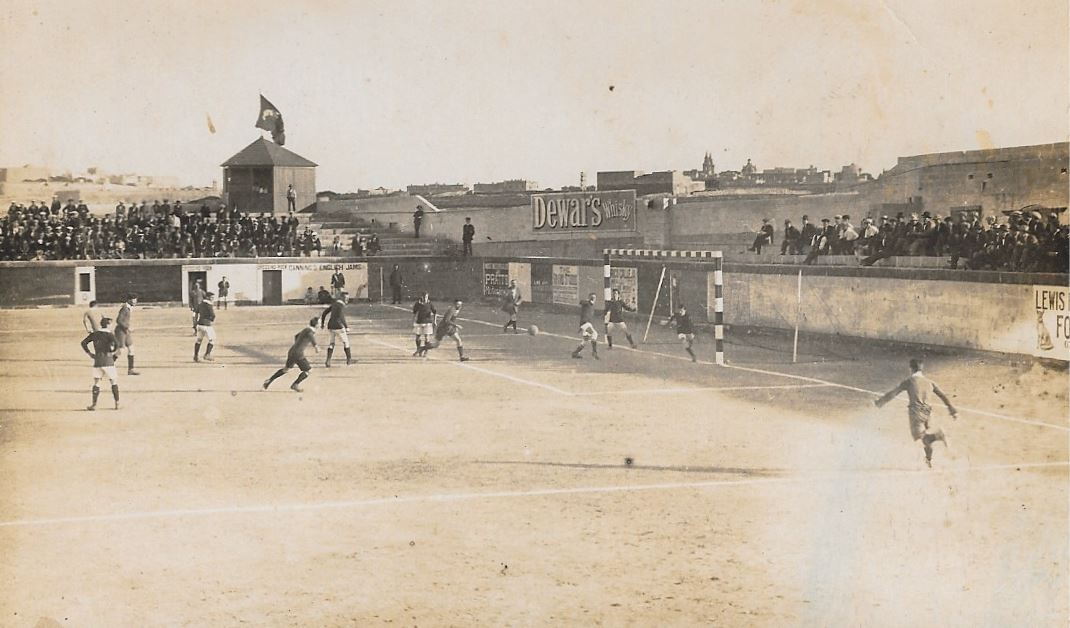
1920s

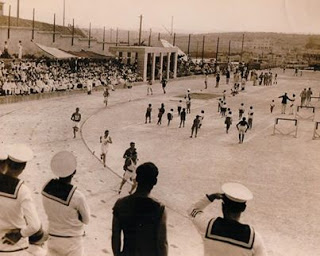
1920s athletics

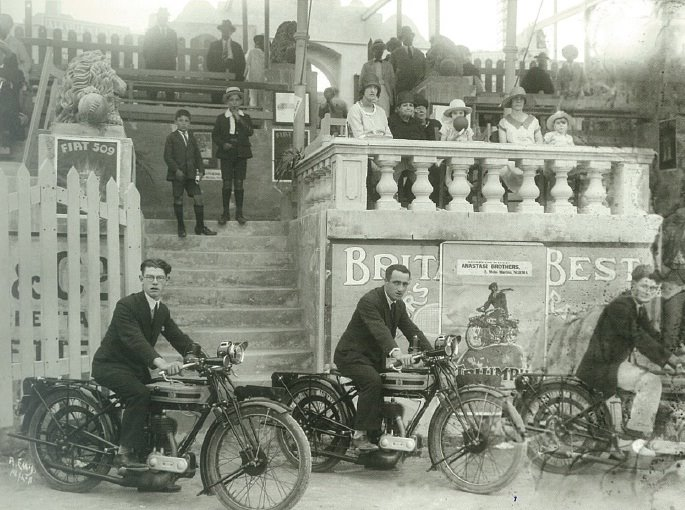
Motorsport in front of the Empire Stadium enclosure during the 1920s

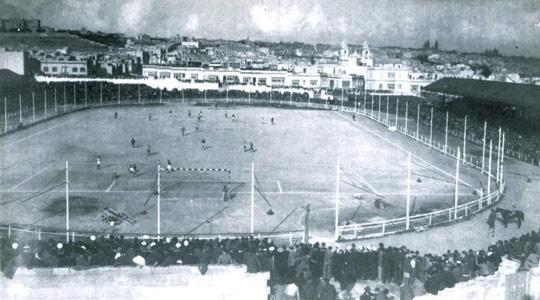
1935

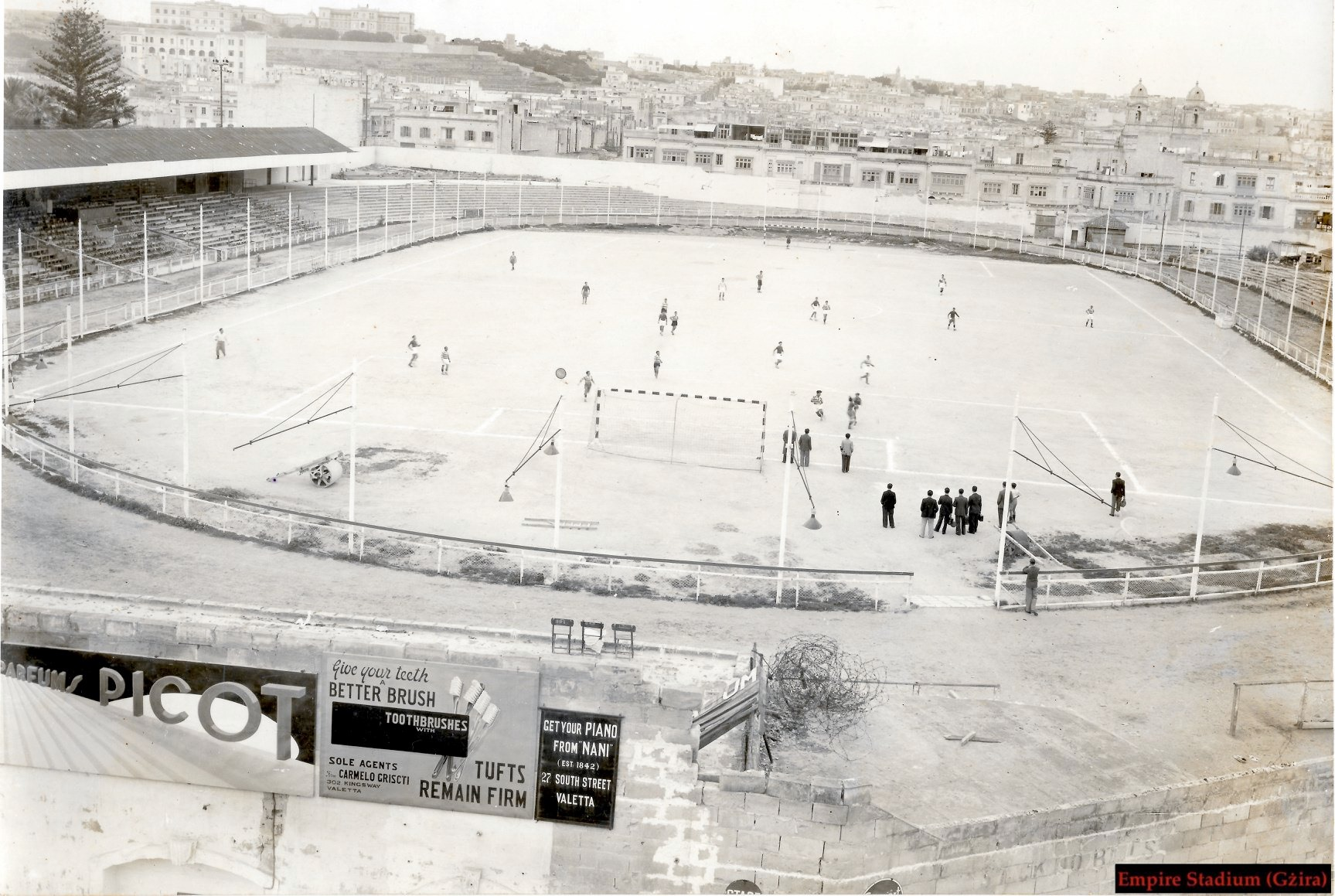
1947

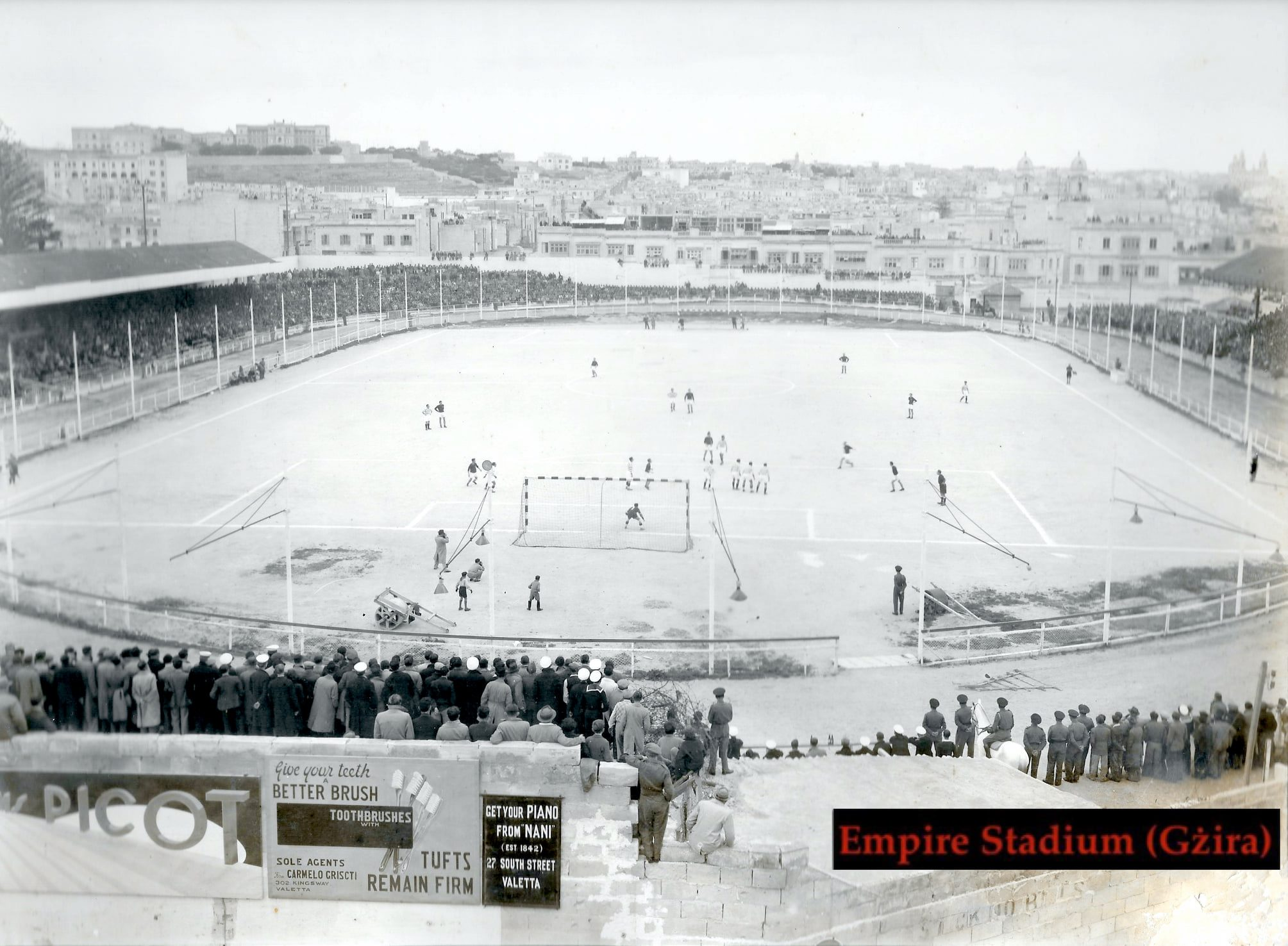
1947

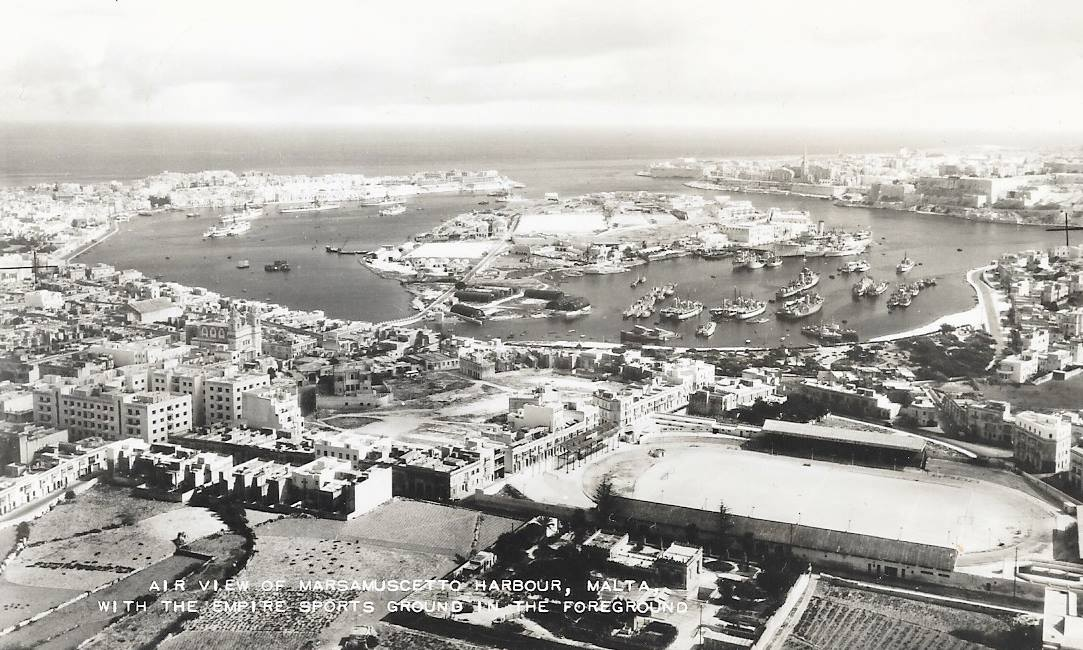
Air view of Marsamuscetto Harbour, Malta, with the Empire Sports Ground in the foreground, ca. 1950

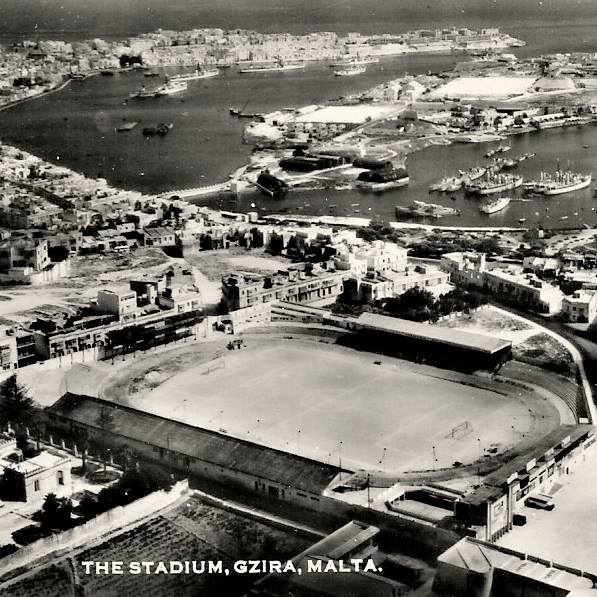
1950s

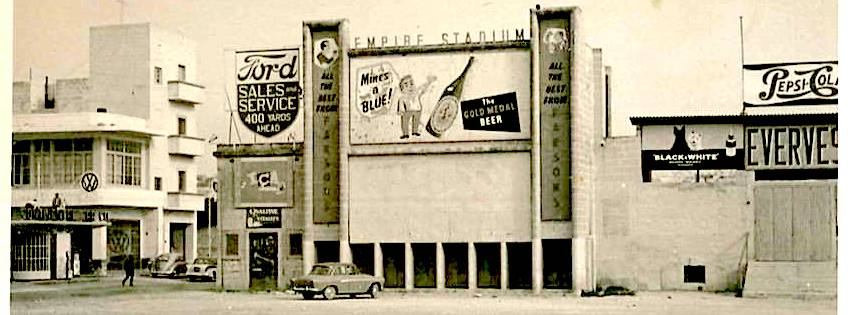
Entrance 1950s

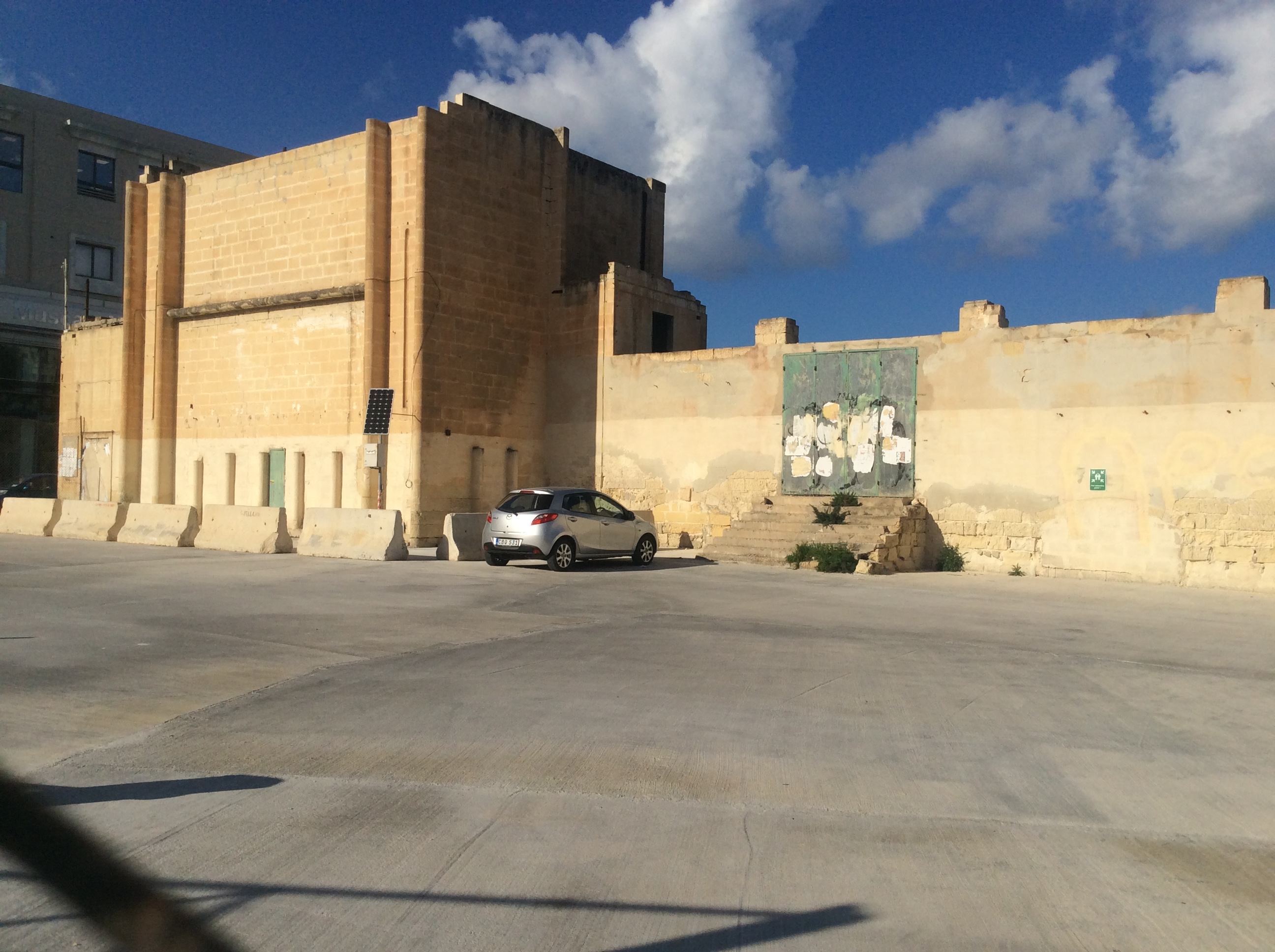
Former entrance, today

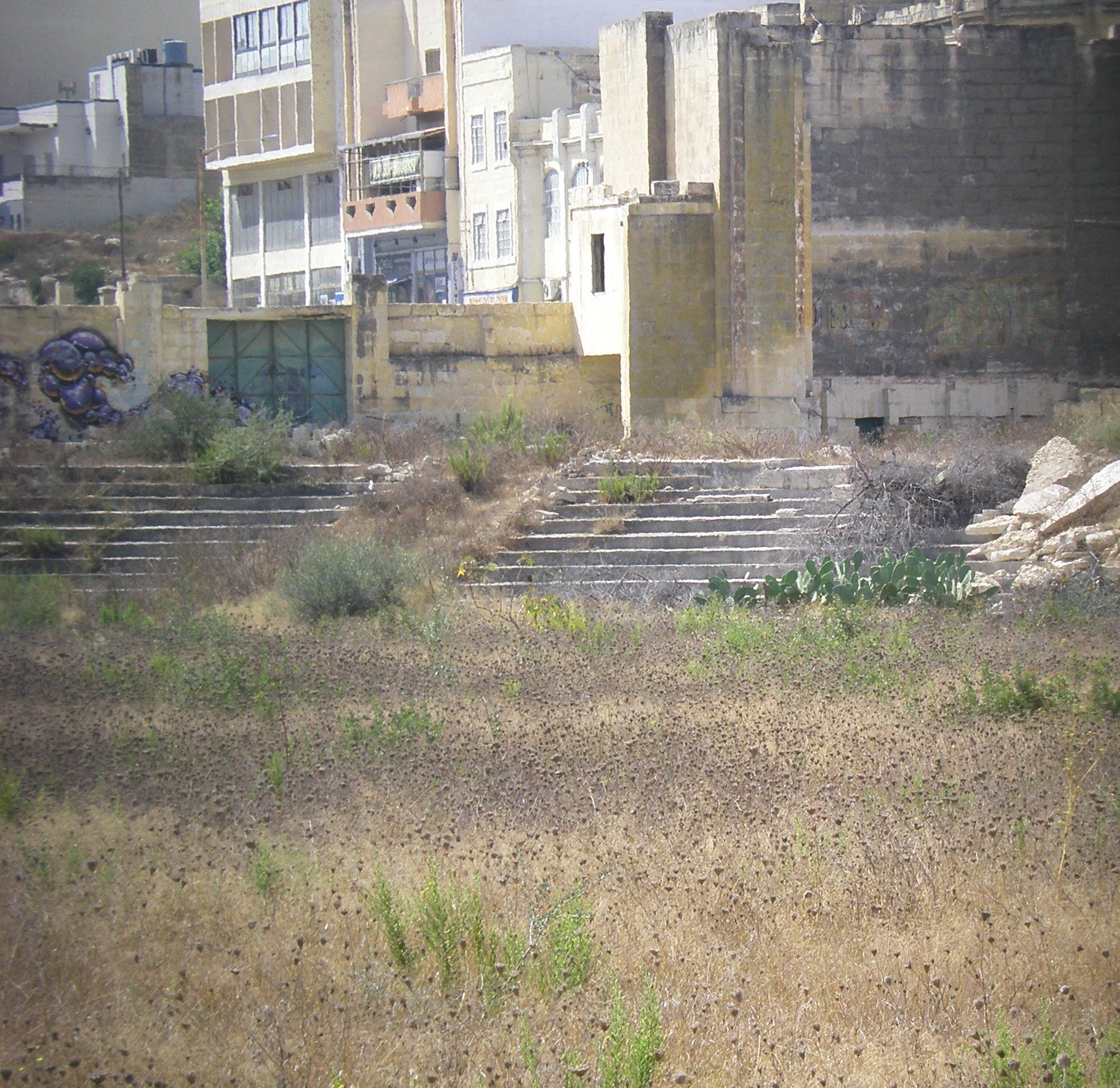
Former stadium, today

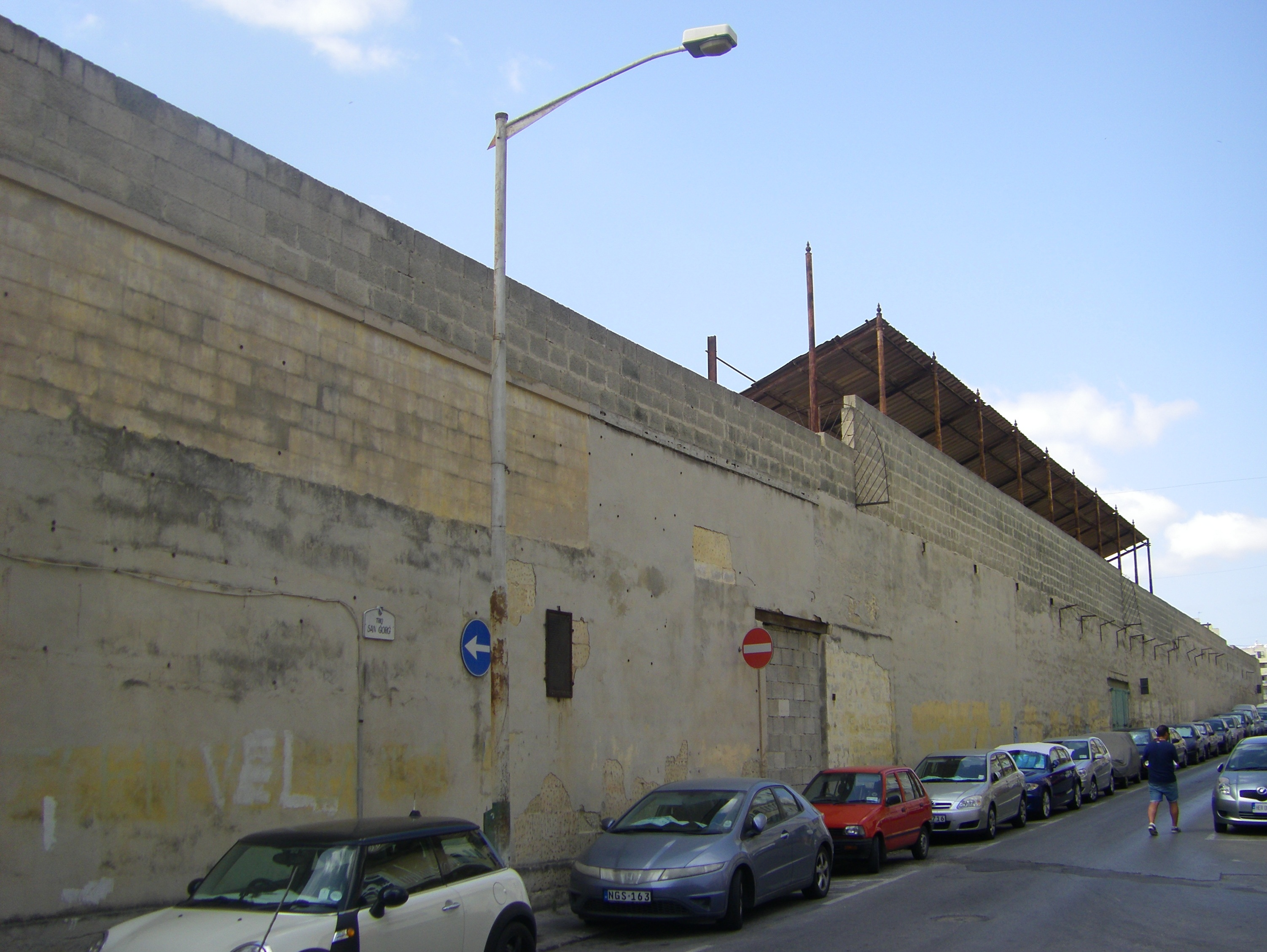
Main stand at the former Empire Stadium

== Record Attendances ==
Date	Match	Score	Competition	Attendance
3 February 1971	Malta – England	0–1		29,751
27 September 1967	Hibernians – Manchester United	0–0		23,217
7 January 1951	MFA XI – Wiener Sport-Club	1–1		22,000
28 December 1947	Sliema/Floriana XI – SK Austria	0–4		20,000
19 September 1979	Valletta – Leeds United	0–4		18,735
17 February 1952	Sliema Wanderers – Floriana	2–2		18,346
24 February 1957	Malta – Austria	2–3		17,421
16 September 1970	Hibernians – Real Madrid	0–0		16,056
6 November 1955	Sliema Wanderers – Floriana	1–0		15,000
