= Maltese FA Trophy =

- Organiser(s): Malta Football Association
- Founded: 1933; 93 years ago
- Region: Malta
- Teams: 67
- Qualifier for: UEFA Conference League
- Domestic cup: Maltese Super Cup
- Current champions: Valletta (15th title)
- Most championships: Sliema Wanderers (22nd title)
- Broadcaster: TVMSports+ (live matches)
- Website: matchcentre.mfa.com.mt
- 2025–26 Maltese FA Trophy

The FA Trophy, currently known as the Meridianbet FA Trophy for sponsorship reasons (colloquially known as It-tazza), is an annual football cup competition that takes place in Malta. The cup was founded in 1933; following a match between England and Italy, played in Rome in May 1933, to where a number of pro-British Maltese supporters travelled to support the English side. The Football Association as recognition donated a silver trophy to be played on the model of the FA Cup.

The team who wins the cup wins a place in the First qualifying round of the UEFA Conference League. This competition is now played on a knock-out basis between all the senior clubs in the Maltese and Gozitan football pyramids. The cup winners play a match for the Maltese Super Cup against the league champions of the season.

== Format ==
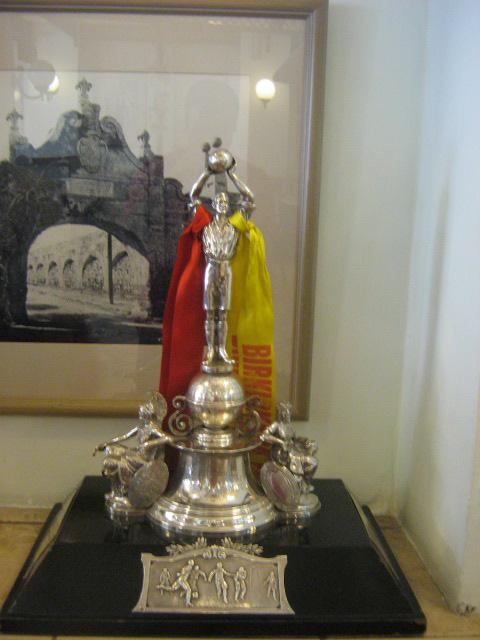
Old Maltese FA Trophy from 1935 to 2016

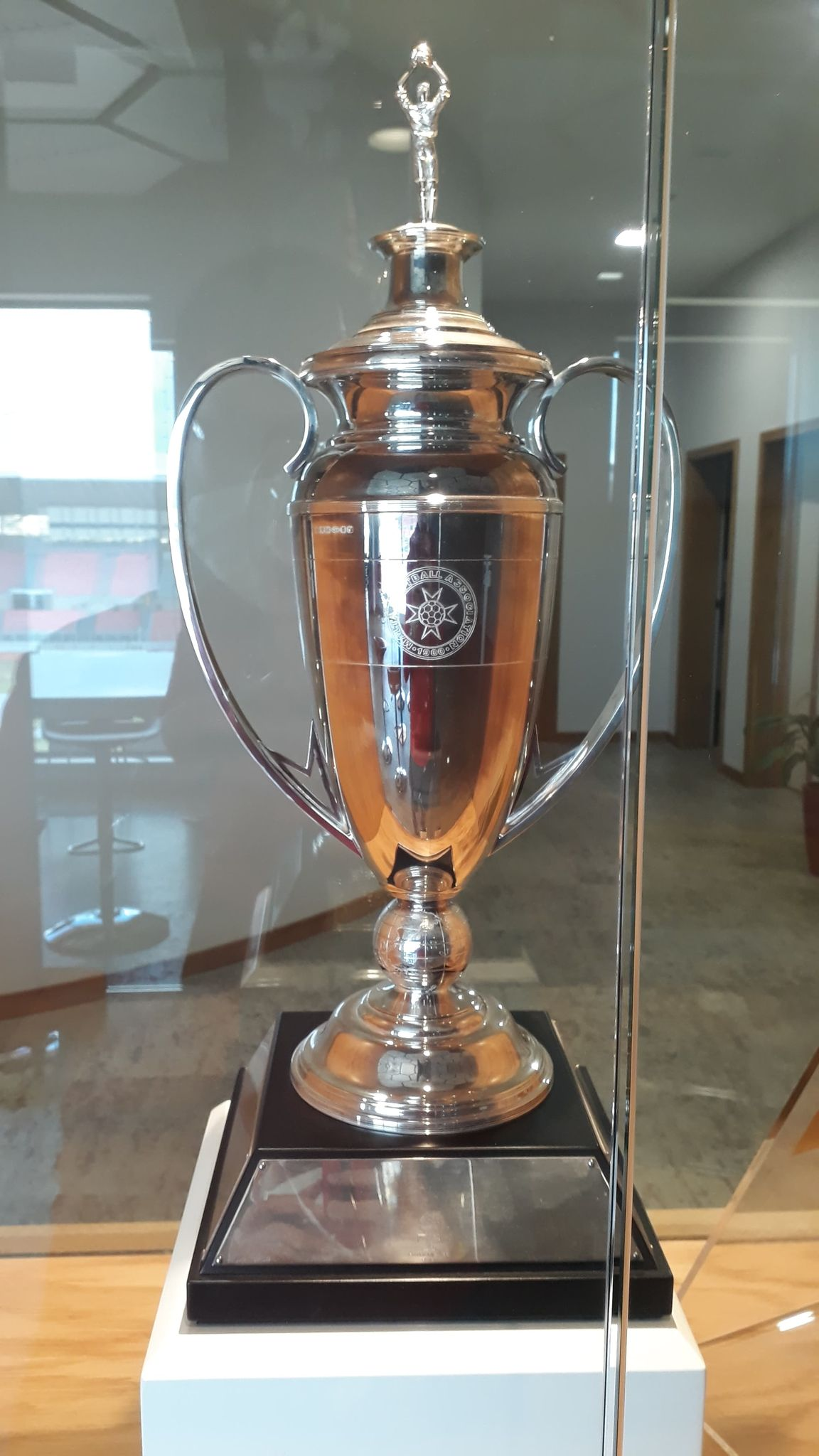
Current design of Maltese FA Trophy since 2017

The ten teams from the First Division and the teams which placed from 4th to the 10th position in the previous season's league, participate in the first round. The cup holders and the top 3 teams are seeded. The eight winning teams play again in the second round, after which, four teams remain. The top three teams in the previous' year league and the cup holders enter straight in the quarter-final phase, together with the other four winning teams.

Starting with the 2009–10 competition, the reigning champions of the Gozo First Division will also be entered into the competition. This will be the case unless Gozo FC, a club based on Gozo but which plays in the Maltese leagues, are playing in either the Maltese Premier League or Maltese First Division and would take the place of the Gozo champion.

On 13 January 2011, the Malta Football Association decided to restructure the format of the trophy as from season 2011–12. Following the success of the MFA League Anniversary Cup, where the then 21 teams of the Maltese four-tiered system participated in the competition, the MFA decided to include all the clubs of Maltese leagues, together with the clubs from the Gozo First Division and the Gozo Second Division. The Gozitan clubs and those from the Maltese Third Division would take part in the First Round, joined by the Maltese Second Division and Maltese First Division clubs in the Second Round, and joined by the Maltese Premier League clubs in a Third Round, where the first six teams of the previous season and the Trophy holder would be seeded. The competition remains on a knock-out basis.

On 21 May 2016, the old silver trophy has been replaced by a new one, partially paid by the English FA. The new trophy has been presented right before the match between England and Malta for the 2018 World Cup qualifiers. The new trophy leans heavily on the heritage of the 1934 original and was designed and made by the Thomas Lyte, British silverware manufacturers. It is 65 cm in height, and 7 kilogrammes in weight, six of which are solid silver. The trophy will be produced with the traditional methods of silversmithing, by hand. The new Trophy will carry forward the main features of the current FA Trophy, with the player holding the ball aloft being the top part on a silver pedestal, also featured on the current trophy, containing the exact wording which symbolises the bond between the English FA and the Malta FA, the globe and the base will remain identical, with the effigy of the football match found on the current trophy also retaining its place. The new trophy has been designed in the shape of the old Cassar Cup, which was another historical competition of the MFA in which the best two British service teams used to play against the two best Maltese teams for the cup. Veterans recall the passion of these matches with the Maltese football aficionados all rooting for the Maltese teams against the British ones.

Since the restructuring of the competition in the 2011–12 season, already a major resemblance to the English F.A. Cup is evident as a lot of major teams have been suffering defeats. The best story so far has been that of S.K. Victoria Wanderers F.C. reaching the semi-finals of the 2016-17 edition, as they became the first Gozitan club that has enetered this competition.

Both the 2019–20 and the 2020–21 seasons of the trophy has been declared abandoned by the MFA due to the spread of the COVID-19 pandemic.

== Winners and finalists ==
Season	Winners	Score	Runners–up	Venue
1934–35	Sliema Wanderers	4–0	Floriana	Empire Stadium, Gżira
1935–36	Sliema Wanderers	2–1	Floriana	Empire Stadium, Gżira
1936–37	Sliema Wanderers	2–0	St.George's	Empire Stadium, Gżira
1937–38	Floriana	2–1	Sliema Wanderers	Empire Stadium, Gżira
1938–39	Melita	4–0	Sliema Wanderers	Empire Stadium, Gżira
1939–40	Sliema Wanderers	3–2	Melita	Empire Stadium, Gżira
No competitions between 1941 and 1944 due to World War II
1944–45	Floriana	2–1	Sliema Wanderers	Empire Stadium, Gżira
1945–46	Sliema Wanderers	2–1	Ħamrun Spartans	Empire Stadium, Gżira
1946–47	Floriana	3–0	Valletta	Empire Stadium, Gżira
1947–48	Sliema Wanderers	2–2 (a.e.t.); 1–0 (rep.)	Hibernians	Empire Stadium, Gżira
1948–49	Floriana	5–1	Sliema Wanderers	Empire Stadium, Gżira
1949–50	Floriana	3–1	St.George's	Empire Stadium, Gżira
1950–51	Sliema Wanderers	5–0	Hibernians	Empire Stadium, Gżira
1951–52	Sliema Wanderers	3–3 (a.e.t.); 1–1 (rep. a.e.t.); 1–0 (2nd rep.)	Hibernians	Empire Stadium, Gżira
1952–53	Floriana	1–0 (a.e.t.)	Sliema Wanderers	Empire Stadium, Gżira
1953–54	Floriana	5–1	Rabat Ajax	Empire Stadium, Gżira
1954–55	Floriana	1–0	Sliema Wanderers	Empire Stadium, Gżira
1955–56	Sliema Wanderers	1–0	Floriana	Empire Stadium, Gżira
1956–57	Floriana	2–0	Valletta	Empire Stadium, Gżira
1957–58	Floriana	2–0	Sliema Wanderers	Empire Stadium, Gżira
1958–59	Sliema Wanderers	1–1 (a.e.t.); 1–0 (rep.)	Valletta	Empire Stadium, Gżira
1959–60	Valletta	3–0	Floriana	Empire Stadium, Gżira
1960–61	Floriana	2–0	Hibernians	Empire Stadium, Gżira
1961–62	Hibernians	1–0	Valletta	Empire Stadium, Gżira
1962–63	Sliema Wanderers	2–0	Hibernians	Empire Stadium, Gżira
1963–64	Valletta	1–0	Sliema Wanderers	Empire Stadium, Gżira
1964–65	Sliema Wanderers	4–2	Floriana	Empire Stadium, Gżira
1965–66	Floriana	2–1	Hibernians	Manoel Island Football Ground
1966–67	Floriana	1–0	Hibernians	Empire Stadium, Gżira
1967–68	Sliema Wanderers	3–2 (a.e.t.)	Hibernians	Empire Stadium, Gżira
1968–69	Sliema Wanderers	3–1	Ħamrun Spartans	Empire Stadium, Gżira
1969–70	Hibernians	2–1	Valletta	Empire Stadium, Gżira
1970–71	Hibernians	3–1 (a.e.t.)	Sliema Wanderers	Empire Stadium, Gżira
1971–72	Floriana	3–1	Sliema Wanderers	Empire Stadium, Gżira
1972–73	Gżira United	0–0 (a.e.t.); 2–0 (rep. a.e.t.)	Birkirkara	Empire Stadium, Gżira
1973–74	Sliema Wanderers	1–0	Floriana	Empire Stadium, Gżira
1974–75	Valletta	1–0	Hibernians	Empire Stadium, Gżira
1975–76	Floriana	2–0 (abandoned in 86')	Valletta	Empire Stadium, Gżira
1976–77	Valletta	1–0	Floriana	Empire Stadium, Gżira
1977–78	Valletta	3–2	Floriana	Empire Stadium, Gżira
1978–79	Sliema Wanderers	2–1	Floriana	Empire Stadium, Gżira
1979–80	Hibernians	2–1	Sliema Wanderers	Empire Stadium, Gżira
1980–81	Floriana	2–1	Senglea	Empire Stadium, Gżira
1981–82	Hibernians	2–0	Sliema Wanderers	National Stadium, Ta' Qali
1982–83	Ħamrun Spartans	2–0	Valletta	National Stadium, Ta' Qali
1983–84	Ħamrun Spartans	0–0 (a.e.t.); 1–0 (rep. a.e.t.)	Żurrieq	National Stadium, Ta' Qali
1984–85	Żurrieq	0–0 (a.e.t.); 2–1 (rep.)	Valletta	National Stadium, Ta' Qali
1985–86	Rabat Ajax	2–0	Żurrieq	National Stadium, Ta' Qali
1986–87	Ħamrun Spartans	2–1	Sliema Wanderers	National Stadium, Ta' Qali
1987–88	Ħamrun Spartans	4–2	Floriana	National Stadium, Ta' Qali
1988–89	Ħamrun Spartans	1–0	Floriana	National Stadium, Ta' Qali
1989–90	Sliema Wanderers	1–0	Birkirkara	National Stadium, Ta' Qali
1990–91	Valletta	2–1 (a.e.t.)	Sliema Wanderers	National Stadium, Ta' Qali
1991–92	Ħamrun Spartans	3–3 (a.e.t.); 2–1 (rep.)	Valletta	National Stadium, Ta' Qali
1992–93	Floriana	5–0	Sliema Wanderers	National Stadium, Ta' Qali
1993–94	Floriana	2–1	Valletta	National Stadium, Ta' Qali
1994–95	Valletta	1–0 (a.e.t.)	Ħamrun Spartans	National Stadium, Ta' Qali
1995–96	Valletta	0–0 (a.e.t.); 1–0 (rep.)	Sliema Wanderers	National Stadium, Ta' Qali
1996–97	Valletta	2–0	Hibernians	National Stadium, Ta' Qali
1997–98	Hibernians	2–1	Valletta	National Stadium, Ta' Qali
1998–99	Valletta	1–0 (a.e.t.)	Birkirkara	National Stadium, Ta' Qali
1999–2000	Sliema Wanderers	4–1	Birkirkara	National Stadium, Ta' Qali
2000–01	Valletta	3–0	Birkirkara	National Stadium, Ta' Qali
2001–02	Birkirkara	1–0	Sliema Wanderers	National Stadium, Ta' Qali
2002–03	Birkirkara	1–0	Sliema Wanderers	National Stadium, Ta' Qali
2003–04	Sliema Wanderers	2–0	Marsaxlokk	National Stadium, Ta' Qali
2004–05	Birkirkara	2–1	Msida St. Joseph	National Stadium, Ta' Qali
2005–06	Hibernians	1–0	Floriana	National Stadium, Ta' Qali
2006–07	Hibernians	1–1 (a.e.t.); 3–0 (pen.)	Sliema Wanderers	National Stadium, Ta' Qali
2007–08	Birkirkara	2–1	Ħamrun Spartans	National Stadium, Ta' Qali
2008–09	Sliema Wanderers	3–3 (a.e.t.); 7–6 (pen.)	Valletta	National Stadium, Ta' Qali
2009–10	Valletta	2–1	Qormi	National Stadium, Ta' Qali
2010–11	Floriana	1–0	Valletta	National Stadium, Ta' Qali
2011–12	Hibernians	3–1	Qormi	National Stadium, Ta' Qali
2012–13	Hibernians	3–1	Qormi	National Stadium, Ta' Qali
2013–14	Valletta	1–0	Sliema Wanderers	National Stadium, Ta' Qali
2014–15	Birkirkara	2–0	Hibernians	National Stadium, Ta' Qali
2015–16	Sliema Wanderers	0–0 (a.e.t.); 5–4 (pen.)	Balzan	National Stadium, Ta' Qali
2016–17	Floriana	2–0	Sliema Wanderers	National Stadium, Ta' Qali
2017–18	Valletta	2–1	Birkirkara	National Stadium, Ta' Qali
2018–19	Balzan	4–4 (a.e.t.); 5–4 (pen.)	Valletta	National Stadium, Ta' Qali
2019–20	Cancelled due to COVID-19 (4 Clubs Left)			
2020–21	Cancelled due to COVID-19 (8 Clubs Left)			
2021–22	Floriana	2–1 (a.e.t.)	Valletta	National Stadium, Ta' Qali
2022–23	Birkirkara	2–0	Marsaxlokk	National Stadium, Ta' Qali
2023–24	Sliema Wanderers	0–0 (a.e.t.); 4–3 (pen.)	Floriana	National Stadium, Ta' Qali
2024–25	Hibernians	2–1	Birkirkara	National Stadium, Ta' Qali
2025–26	Valletta	2–1	Gzira United	National Stadium, Ta' Qali

=== Performance by club ===
Club	Wins	First final won	Last final won	Runners-up	Last final lost	Total final appearances
Sliema Wanderers	22	1935	2024	21	2017	43
Floriana	21	1938	2022	13	2024	34
Valletta	15	1960	2026	15	2022	29
Hibernians	11	1962	2025	11	2015	22
Birkirkara	6	2002	2023	6	2025	12
Ħamrun Spartans	6	1983	1992	4	2008	10
Żurrieq	1	1985	1985	2	1986	3
Melita	1	1939	1939	1	1940	2
Rabat Ajax	1	1986	1986	1	1954	2
Balzan	1	2019	2019	1	2016	2
Gżira United	1	1973	1973	1	2026	2
Qormi	–			3	2013	3
St. George's	–			2	1950	2
Marsaxlokk	–			2	2023	2
Senglea Athletic	–			1	1981	1
Msida St. Joseph	–			1	2005	1
