= Birkirkara F.C. =

Maltese football club

Birkirkara
- Full name: Birkirkara Football Club
- Nickname: Stripes
- Founded: 1950; 76 years ago
- Ground: Ta' Qali Stadium
- Capacity: 16,997
- Chairman: Chris Cardona
- Head Coach: Paul Zammit
- League: Maltese Premier League
- 2025–26: Maltese Premier League, 8th of 12
- Website: www.birkirkarafc.com
| Home colours | Away colours |

Birkirkara Football Club is a professional football club based in the town of Birkirkara, on the island of Malta. The club was formed in 1950, following the amalgamation of Birkirkara United and Birkirkara Celtic. Birkirkara currently play in the Maltese Premier League, which it has won on four occasions, most recently in the 2012–13 season.

Birkirkara is one of the founding members of the European Club Association.

The club also has a women's team.

== Kits ==
| Period | Kit supplier | Shirt sponsor (front) | Ref. |
|---|---|---|---|
| 2003-04 | (Italy) Lotto | | |
| 2004-06 | (Italy) Lotto | McDonald's (Malta), Cisk Export and Team sport (Malta) | |
| 2006-09 | (Italy) Lotto | McDonald's (Malta) and Team sport (Malta) | |
| 2009-10 | (Italy) Diadora | McDonald's (Malta) | |
| 2010-12 | (Italy) Macron | McDonald's (Malta) | |
| 2012-21 | (Germany) Adidas | McDonald's (Malta) | |
| 2021-26 | (United States) Nike | McDonald's (Malta) | |
| 2026- | (Italy) Macron | McDonald's (Malta) | |

== Honours ==
=== Major ===
- Maltese Premier League
  - Winners (4): 1999–2000, 2005–06, 2009–10, 2012–13
  - Runners-up (10):1952–53, 1996–97, 1997–98, 1998–99, 2002–03, 2003–04, 2004–05, 2013–14, 2022-23, 2024-25
- Maltese FA Trophy
  - Winners (6): 2001–02, 2002–03, 2004–05, 2007–08, 2014–15, 2022–23
  - Runners-up (7): 1972–73, 1989–90, 1998–99, 1999–2000, 2000–01, 2017–18, 2024–25
- Maltese Super Cup
  - Winners (7): 2002, 2003, 2004, 2005, 2006, 2013, 2014
  - Runners-up (7): 1997, 1999, 2000, 2008, 2010, 2015, 2023
- Euro Challenge/Lowenbrau Cup
  - Winners (3): 1998, 2003, 2008
- MFA Super 5 Lottery Tournament
  - Winners (4): 1998, 2002, 2004, 2006

=== Minor ===
- Sons of Malta Cup (for the Second Division)
  - Winners (3): 1967–68, 1971–72, 1978–79
  - Runners-up (1): 1976–77
- Cassar Cup:
  - Runners-up (1): 1952–53

== Current squad ==
As of 19 August 2026

Note: Flags indicate national team as defined under FIFA eligibility rules; some limited exceptions apply. Players may hold more than one non-FIFA nationality.

| No. | Pos. | Nation | Player |
|---|---|---|---|
| 1 | GK | CMR | Fabrice Ondoa |
| 3 | DF | BRA | Frazan |
| 4 | DF | BRA | Yago |
| 5 | MF | BRA | JP Iseppe |
| 8 | MF | POR | Rafael Santos |
| 9 | FW | MLT | Kemar Reid |
| 10 | MF | MLT | Jan Busuttil |
| 11 | DF | BRA | Fernandinho |
| 13 | GK | MLT | Rashed Al-Tumi |
| 14 | DF | BRA | Jefferson Vinicius |
| 15 | MF | MLT | Matthew Scicluna |
| 17 | FW | FRA | Louis Pahama |

| No. | Pos. | Nation | Player |
|---|---|---|---|
| 19 | GK | MLT | Matthew Grech |
| 22 | DF | MLT | Zach Muscat |
| 24 | DF | MLT | Kerson Fenech |
| 25 | MF | MLT | Neil Micallef |
| 27 | FW | NGA | Franklin Sasere |
| 28 | DF | USA | Shaft Brewer Jr. |
| 74 | DF | MLT | Jake Vassallo |
| 77 | DF | MLT | Alejandro Garzia |
| 88 | MF | SRB | Aleksandar Đorđević |
| 97 | DF | BRA | Kadu |
| 99 | FW | BRA | Amarildo |

=== Out on loan ===
Note: Flags indicate national team as defined under FIFA eligibility rules; some limited exceptions apply. Players may hold more than one non-FIFA nationality.

| No. | Pos. | Nation | Player |

== European record ==
All results (home and away) list Birkirkara's goal tally first.

| Season | Competition | Round | Club | Home | Away | Aggregate |
|---|---|---|---|---|---|---|
| 1997–98 | UEFA Cup | 1Q | (Slovakia) Spartak Trnava | 0–1 | 1–3 | 1–4 |
| 1998–99 | UEFA Cup | 1Q | (Ukraine) Shakhtar Donetsk | 0–4 | 1–2 | 1–6 |
| 1999–00 | UEFA Cup | QR | (Denmark) Lyngby | 0–0 | 0–7 | 0–7 |
| 2000–01 | UEFA Champions League | 1Q | (Iceland) KR Reykjavík | 1–2 | 1–4 | 2–6 |
| 2001–02 | UEFA Cup | QR | (Georgia (country)) Locomotive Tbilisi | 0–0 | 1–1 | 1–1 (a) |
| 2001–02 | UEFA Cup | 1R | (Russia) Dynamo Moscow | 0–0 | 0–1 | 0–1 |
| 2002–03 | UEFA Cup | QR | (Ukraine) Metalurh Zaporizhya | 0–0 | 0–3 | 0–3 |
| 2003–04 | UEFA Cup | QR | (Hungary) Ferencváros | 0–5 | 0–1 | 0–6 |
| 2004–05 | UEFA Cup | 1Q | (Albania) Partizani | 2–1 | 2–4 | 4–5 |
| 2005–06 | UEFA Cup | 1Q | (Cyprus) APOEL | 0–2 | 0–4 | 0–6 |
| 2006–07 | UEFA Champions League | 1Q | (Faroe Islands) B36 Tórshavn | 0–3 | 2–2 | 2–5 |
| 2007 | UEFA Intertoto Cup | 1R | (Slovenia) Maribor | 0–3 | 1–2 | 1–5 |
| 2008–09 | UEFA Cup | 1Q | (Croatia) Hajduk Split | 0–3 | 0–4 | 0–7 |
| 2009–10 | UEFA Europa League | 1Q | (Croatia) Slaven Belupo | 0–0 | 0–1 | 0–1 |
| 2010–11 | UEFA Champions League | 1Q | (Andorra) FC Santa Coloma | 4–3 | 3–0 (Note: Awarded; the match was cancelled because of poor pitch conditions) | 7–3 |
| 2010–11 | UEFA Champions League | 2Q | (Slovakia) Žilina | 1–0 | 0–3 | 1–3 |
| 2011–12 | UEFA Europa League | 1Q | (Albania) Vllaznia | 0–1 | 1–1 | 1–2 |
| 2012–13 | UEFA Europa League | 1Q | (North Macedonia) Metalurg | 2–2 | 0–0 | 2–2 (a) |
| 2013–14 | UEFA Champions League | 2Q | (Slovenia) Maribor | 0–0 | 0–2 | 0–2 |
| 2014–15 | UEFA Europa League | 1Q | (Hungary) Diósgyőr | 1–2 | 1–4 | 2–6 |
| 2015–16 | UEFA Europa League | 1Q | (Armenia) Ulisses | 0–0 | 3–1 | 3–1 |
| 2015–16 | UEFA Europa League | 2Q | (England) West Ham | 1–0 | 0–1 | 1–1 (3–5 p) |
| 2016–17 | UEFA Europa League | 1Q | (Bosnia and Herzegovina) Široki Brijeg | 2–0 | 1–1 | 3–1 |
| 2016–17 | UEFA Europa League | 2Q | (Scotland) Heart of Midlothian | 0–0 | 2–1 | 2–1 |
| 2016–17 | UEFA Europa League | 3Q | (Russia) Krasnodar | 0–3 | 1–3 | 1–6 |
| 2018–19 | UEFA Europa League | PR | (Faroe Islands) KÍ Klaksvík | 1–1 | 1–2 | 2–3 |
| 2021–22 | UEFA Europa Conference League | 1Q | (San Marino) La Fiorita | 1–0 | 1–1 | 2–1 |
| 2021–22 | UEFA Europa Conference League | 2Q | (Slovenia) Olimpija Ljubljana | 1–0 | 0–1 | 1–1 (4–5 p) |
| 2023–24 | UEFA Europa Conference League | 1Q | (Slovenia) Maribor | 1–2 | 1–1 | 2–3 |
| 2025–26 | UEFA Conference League | 1Q | (Moldova) Petrocub Hîncești | 1–0 | 0−3 | 1−3 |

== Coaches ==
- (Malta) Frankie Tabone (1951–53)
- (Malta) Paul Chetcuti (1961–62)
- (Malta) Emanuel Borg (1964–65)
- (Malta) Salvu Cuschieri (1965–68)
- (Malta) Frans Bonnici (1968–69)
- (Malta) Emmle Saliba (1969–70)
- (Malta) Salvu Cuschieri (1970–73)
- (Malta) Tony Buhagiar (1973–74)
- (Malta) Carmel Galea (1974–76)
- (Malta) Tony Euchar Grech (1976–78)
- (Malta) Frankie Zammit (1978–79)
- (Malta) Marcel Scicluna (1979–84)
- (Malta) Joe Attard (1984–86)
- (Malta) Alfred "Freddie" Cardona (1986–87)
- (Malta) Joe Cilia (1986–88)
- (Malta) Robert Gatt (1988–89)
- (Malta) Lolly Aquilina (1989–92)
- (Bulgaria) Todor Raykov (1992–93)
- (Malta) Alfred "Freddie" Cardona (1993–94)
- (Malta) Borislav Giorev (1994–95)
- (Malta) Lawrence Borg (1995–96)
- (England) Alan Sunderland (1996–97)
- (Malta) Alfred "Freddie" Cardona (1996–97)
- (Malta) Alfred "Freddie" & (Malta) Robert Gatt (1997–98)
- (Serbia) Vlada Pejović (1998–99)
- (Bulgaria) Atanas Marinov (1999–00)
- (Malta) Alfred "Freddie" (2000–1 December 2001)
- (Malta) Stephen Azzopardi (1 December 2001 – 1 March 2007)
- (Malta) John Buttigieg (1 July 2008 – 30 June 2009)
- (Malta) Paul Zammit (1 July 2009 – 30 May 2011)
- (Malta) Patrick Curmi (22 May 2011 – 28 September 2011)
- (Malta) Paul Zammit (3 October 2011 – 29 May 2015)
- (Italy) Giovanni Tedesco (1 June 2015 – 10 December 2015)
- (Croatia) Dražen Besek (31 December 2015 – 30 November 2016)
- (Croatia) Nikola Jaros (6 December 2016 – 1 June 2017)
- (Malta) Peter Pullicino (1 June 2017 – 6 September 2017)
- (Malta) Paul Zammit (6 September 2017 – 26 March 2019)
- (Malta) John Buttigieg (18 April 2019 – 7 September 2019)
- (Netherlands) André Paus (10 September 2019 – 20 April 2022)
- (Malta) Jonathan Holland (Caretaker) (20 April 2022 – 18 May 2022)
- (Italy) Giovanni Tedesco (18 May 2022 – 26 November 2023)
- (Malta) Brian Chetcuti (Caretaker) (26 November 2023 – 5 February 2024)
- (Malta) Jose Borg (5 February 2024 – 13 May 2024)
- (Italy) Stefano De Angelis (7 June 2024 – )

== Futsal ==
Current squad 2018/19

| Number | Player | Pos. | Nat. |
| 4 | Jason Mifsud | Sweeper | (Malta) |
| 5 | Ryan Xuereb | Winger | (Malta) |
| 6 | Alan Galea | Winger | (Malta) |
| 8 | Gary Inguanez | Sweeper | (Malta) |
| 10 | Marwan Telisi | Winger | (Malta) |
| 11 | Ayoub Hamad Ali | Winger | (Libya) |
| 22 | Rennie Tanti | Winger | (Malta) |
| 23 | Matthew Gatt | Goalkeeper | (Malta) |
| 24 | William Barbosa | Sweeper | (Brazil) |
| 40 | Eslam Khalifa | Pivot | (Libya) |
| 88 | Christian Lia | Goalkeeper | (Malta) |
| 99 | Glenn Bonello | Pivot | (Malta) |
