= Hibernians F.C. =

Association football club in Malta

Hibernians
- Full name: Hibernians Football Club
- Nicknames: Hibs; Raħal Ġdid (Paola); The Peacocks
- Founded: 1922; 104 years ago
- Ground: Tony Bezzina Stadium, Paola, Malta
- Capacity: 2,968
- Chairman: Ranier Bezzina
- Manager: Andrei Agius
- League: Maltese Premier League
- 2025–26: Maltese Premier League, 7th of 12
- Website: www.hiberniansfc.mt
Home colours	Away colours

Hibernians Football Club is a Maltese professional football club based in the town of Paola. They are the only Malta football club to have never been relegated from the Premier League.

== History ==
The club played one season in 1922 as Constitutionals FC, representing the pro-British Constitutional Party. They resumed playing again in the 1927–28 season and became a top amateur side, winning the Amateur League in 1930–31.

Meanwhile, the Constitutional Party had upset the Catholic Church so much that, in May 1930, Catholics were told not to vote for the party. The football club changed its name a year later to Hibernians Football Club as a nod to Hibernian, the club founded by Irish Catholics in Edinburgh. They won their first match as Hibernians 2–1, against HMS Antelope in October 1931. They had to wait for a place to become available in the professional league, but in January 1933 they joined the league, their first result being a 3–1 victory over Sliema Rangers. They have stayed in the top division ever since. Hibernians then won their first league title in 1961, with a team featuring Maltese international players like brothers Louis and Eddie Theobald and Freddie Mizzi.

Around 1970 English football legend Sir Stanley Matthews managed Hibernians. He led the club to a League title and two Maltese FA Trophies.

Hibernians faced a long period of decline followed the success of the 1980s to the end of the decade. Hibernians have a futsal team, which plays in Malta's top futsal league, the Premier Futsal League.

== Stadium ==
The club's home ground is Hibernians Stadium, a multi-use stadium in Paola, which has a capacity of about 3,000.

== Honours ==
- Maltese Premier League
  - Winners (13): 1960–61, 1966–67, 1968–69, 1978–79, 1980–81, 1981–82, 1993–94, 1994–95, 2001–02, 2008–09, 2014–15, 2016–17, 2021–22
- Maltese FA Trophy
  - Winners (11): 1961–62, 1969–70, 1970–71, 1979–80, 1981–82, 1997–98, 2005–06, 2006–07, 2011–12, 2012–13, 2024–25
- Maltese Super Cup
  - Winners (5): 1994,2007,2015,2022,2026
- Cassar Cup
  - Winners (2): 1961–62, 1962–63
- Testaferrata Cup
  - Winners (3): 1977–78, 1978–79, 1980–81
- Euro Challenge Cup
  - Winners (4): 2006-07, 2007-08, 2009-10, 2012-13
- Quadrangular Tournament
  - Winners (1): 2005-06
- Independence Cup
  - Winners (3): 1967–68, 1968–69, 1970–71
- Sons of Malta Cup
  - Winners (3): 1969–70, 1970–71, 1971–72
- Olympic Cup
  - Winners (1): 1962–63
- Schembri Shield
  - Winners (1): 1961–62

== European record ==
Accurate as of 11 August 2022

Competition	Played	Won	Drew	Lost	GF	GA	GD	Win%
European Cup / Champions League	28	5	5	18	20	71	−51	17.86
Cup Winners' Cup	10	2	2	6	4	17	−13	20.00
UEFA Cup / UEFA Europa League	30	3	1	26	25	107	−82	10.00
UEFA Europa Conference League	8	4	2	2	15	14	+1	50.00
UEFA Intertoto Cup	12	2	2	8	9	26	−17	16.67
Inter-Cities Fairs Cup	2	0	0	2	0	7	−7	0.00
Total	90	16	12	62	82	238	−156	17.78

Legend: GF = Goals For. GA = Goals Against. GD = Goal Difference.

Season	Competition	Round	Club	Home	Away	Aggregate
1961–62	European Cup	Prelim	(Switzerland) Servette FC	1–2	0–5	1–7
1962–63	European Cup Winners' Cup	Prelim	(Greece) Olympiacos	advanced by walkover		
1962–63	European Cup Winners' Cup	1R	(Spain) Atlético Madrid	0–1	0–4	0–5
1967–68	European Cup	1R	(England) Manchester United F.C.	0–0	0–4	0–4
1968–69	Inter-Cities Fairs Cup	1R	(Greece) Aris Thessaloniki F.C.	0–6	0–1	0–7
1969–70	European Cup	1R	(Czechoslovakia) FC Spartak Trnava	2–2	0–4	2–6
1970–71	European Cup Winners' Cup	1R	(Spain) Real Madrid C.F.	0–0	0–5	0–5
1971–72	European Cup Winners' Cup	Prelim	(Iceland) Fram	3–0	0–2	3–2
1971–72	European Cup Winners' Cup	1R	(Romania) Steaua Bucharest	0–0	0–1	0–1
1974–75	UEFA Cup	1R	(Netherlands) FC Amsterdam	0–7	0–5	0–12
1976–77	UEFA Cup	1R	(Switzerland) Grasshoppers	0–2	0–7	0–9
1978–79	UEFA Cup	1R	(Portugal) S.C. Braga	3–2	0–5	3–7
1979–80	European Cup	1R	(Republic of Ireland) Dundalk F.C.	1–0	0–2	1–2
1980–81	European Cup Winners' Cup	1R	(Republic of Ireland) Waterford	1–0	0–4	1–4
1981–82	European Cup	1R	(Socialist Federal Republic of Yugoslavia) Red Star Belgrade	1–2	1–8	2–10
1982–83	European Cup	1R	(Poland) Widzew Łódź	1–4	1–3	2–7
1986–87	UEFA Cup	1R	(Bulgaria) Trakia Plovdiv	0–2	0–8	0–10
1994–95	UEFA Cup	Prelim	(Belarus) FC Dinamo Minsk	4–3 (a.e.t.)	1–3	5–6
1995–96	UEFA Cup	Prelim	(Ukraine) FC Chornomorets Odesa	2–5	0–2	2–7
1996	UEFA Intertoto Cup	Group 11	(Russia) FC Ural Yekaterinburg	1–2	—N/a	5th
1996	UEFA Intertoto Cup	Group 11	(Bulgaria) PFC CSKA Sofia	—N/a	1–4	5th
1996	UEFA Intertoto Cup	Group 11	(France) RC Strasbourg Alsace	0–2	—N/a	5th
1996	UEFA Intertoto Cup	Group 11	(Turkey) Kocaelispor	—N/a	3–5	5th
2001	UEFA Intertoto Cup	1R	(Poland) Zagłębie Lubin	1–0	0–4	1–4
2002–03	UEFA Champions League	1Q	(Republic of Ireland) Shelbourne F.C.	2–2	1–0	3–2
2002–03	UEFA Champions League	2Q	(Portugal) Boavista F.C.	3–3	0–4	3–7
2003	UEFA Intertoto Cup	1R	(Finland) AC Allianssi	1–1	0–1	1–2
2004	UEFA Intertoto Cup	1R	(Croatia) NK Slaven Belupo	2–1	0–3	2–4
2005–06	UEFA Cup	1Q	(Cyprus) AC Omonia	0–3	0–3	0–6
2006–07	UEFA Cup	1Q	(Romania) FC Dinamo București	0–4	1–5	1–9
2007–08	UEFA Cup	1Q	(Serbia) FK Vojvodina	0–2	1–5	1–7
2008	UEFA Intertoto Cup	1R	(Slovenia) ND Gorica	0–3	0–0	0–3
2009–10	UEFA Champions League	1Q	(Montenegro) FK Mogren	0–2	0–4	0–6
2012–13	UEFA Europa League	1Q	(Bosnia and Herzegovina) FK Sarajevo	4–4	2–5	6–9
2013–14	UEFA Europa League	1Q	(Serbia) FK Vojvodina	1–4	2–3	3–7
2014–15	UEFA Europa League	1Q	(Slovakia) FC Spartak Trnava	2–4	0–5	2–9
2015–16	UEFA Champions League	2Q	(Israel) Maccabi Tel Aviv F.C.	2–1	1–5	3–6
2016–17	UEFA Europa League	1Q	(Slovakia) FC Spartak Trnava	0–3	0–3	0–6
2017–18	UEFA Champions League	1Q	(Estonia) FCI Tallinn	2–0	1–0	3–0
2017–18	UEFA Champions League	2Q	(Austria) FC Red Bull Salzburg	0–3	0–3	0–6
2019–20	UEFA Europa League	1Q	(Belarus) Shakhtyor Soligorsk	0–1	0–1	0–2
2020–21	UEFA Europa League	1Q	(Liechtenstein) Vaduz	—N/a	2–0	—N/a
2020–21	UEFA Europa League	2Q	(Hungary) Fehérvár	0–1	—N/a	—N/a
2021–22	UEFA Champions League	1Q	(Estonia) Flora	0–3	0–2	0–5
2021–22	UEFA Europa Conference League	2Q	(San Marino) Folgore	4–2	3–1	7–3
2021–22	UEFA Europa Conference League	3Q	(Latvia) Riga	1–4 (a.e.t.)	1–0	2–4
2022–23	UEFA Champions League	1Q	(Republic of Ireland) Shamrock Rovers	0–0	0–3	0–3
2022–23	UEFA Europa Conference League	2Q	(Estonia) FCI Levadia	3–2	1–1	4–3
2022–23	UEFA Europa Conference League	3Q	(Latvia) RFS	1–3	1–1	2–4
2025–26	UEFA Conference League	2Q	(Slovakia) Spartak Trnava	1–2	1–5	2–7

== Players ==
Maltese teams are limited to eight players without Maltese citizenship. The squad list includes only the principal nationality of each player; several non-European players on the squad have dual citizenship with an EU country.

=== Current squad ===
As of 19 August 2026

Note: Flags indicate national team as defined under FIFA eligibility rules; some limited exceptions apply. Players may hold more than one non-FIFA nationality.

No.	Pos.	Nation	Player
1	GK	ITA	Matteo Cardinali
2	DF	MLT	Cain Attard
4	MF	NGR	Silas Alfred
5	DF	MLT	Kurt Shaw
6	MF	AUT	Fabian Jankovic
7	FW	MLT	Joseph Mbong
8	MF	GER	Jamie Wähling
9	FW	RWA	Joy-Slayd Mickels
10	FW	MLT	Jurgen Degabriele
11	MF	MLT	Bjorn Kristensen
13	MF	CIV	Ali Diakité
14	DF	MLT	Dexter Xuereb
15	DF	CIV	Olivier N'Zi

No.	Pos.	Nation	Player
16	MF	MLT	Jayden Roe
17	FW	MLT	Isaiah Chukunyere
18	FW	BRA	Ryder Matos
21	MF	MLT	Nathan Agius
22	DF	AUS	Duane Bonnici
23	DF	MLT	Matthew Ellul
24	DF	ARG	Leandro Lacunza
28	GK	ENG	Pablo Sánchez
30	DF	GER	Moritz Römling
41	DF	UKR	Denys Norenkov
70	FW	CPV	Mailson Lima
77	MF	SVK	Boris Druga
88	FW	NGR	Sunday Akinbule

=== Out on loan ===
Note: Flags indicate national team as defined under FIFA eligibility rules; some limited exceptions apply. Players may hold more than one non-FIFA nationality.

No.	Pos.	Nation	Player

== Historical list of coaches ==
- (Malta) Joe A. Griffiths
- (Malta) Saviour Cuschieri (1961 – 1962)
- (Scotland) Jimmy Davidson (1962 – 1963)
- (Malta) Hillary Tagliaferro (1964 – 1966)
- (Malta) Lino Bugeja (1966 – 1970)
- (Malta) Hillary Tagliaferro (1967 – 1970)
- (Malta) Johnny Calleja (1972 – 1977)
- (Malta) George Busuttil (1977 – 1979)
- (Malta) Eddie Theobald (1981 – 1982)
- (Malta) Johnny Calleja (1982 – 1983)
- (Malta) George Busuttil (1984 – 1985)
- (Italy) Terenzio Polverini (1987 – 1988)
- (Malta) Edward Darmanin (1987 – 1989)
- (Malta) Joe Cilia (1989 – 1992)
- (Malta) Brian Talbot (1992 – 1996)
- (England) Mark Miller (1997;– 1999)
- (Malta) Robert Gatt (30 June 1999 – 8 July 2007)
- (Albania) Edmond Lufi (2007 – 8 September 2008)
- (England) Mark Miller (1 July 2008 – 2012)
- (Malta) Michael Woods (13 June 2012 – 2013)
- (Serbia) Branko Nišević (30 May 2013 – 2016)
- (England) Mark Miller (2016 – 5 March 2018)
- (Malta) Mario Muscat (5 March 2018 – 4 July 2018)
- (Italy) Stefano Sanderra (4 July 2018 – 30 June 2022)
- (Italy) Andrea Pisanu (8 July 2022 – 6 February 2023)
- (Malta) Silvio Vella (7 February 2023 – 1 June 2023)
- (Serbia) Branko Nišević (17 July 2023 – 26 February 2026)
- (Malta) Andrei Agius (26 February 2026 – )

== Women's team ==
A women's team plays in the Women's Maltese First Division. The team is the national record champion with twelve titles, the most recent being won in 2016.

== See also ==
- Hibernians Basketball Club
