= 2026–27 in Maltese football =

Football in Malta
- Season: 2026–27

Men's football
- Super Cup: Valletta

Women's football
- Women's Super Cup: Mġarr United

The 2026–27 season is the 112th competitive football season in Malta. It runs from August 2026 to May 2027 and encompasses the top four tiers of the Maltese football league system, as well as the domestic cup competition.

== National teams ==
=== Malta men's national football team ===
==== Nations League ====
Pos	Team	Pld	W	D	L	GF	GA	GD	Pts	Promotion	(Malta)	(Gibraltar)	(Andorra)
1	Malta (P)	3	2	1	0	4	2	+2	7	Promotion to League C	—	1–1	1–0
2	Gibraltar (P)	2	0	2	0	1	1	0	2	Promotion to League C	16 Nov	—	0–0
3	Andorra (P)	3	0	1	2	1	3	−2	1	Promotion to League C	1–2	13 Nov	—

Updated to match(es) played on 4 October 2026. Source: UEFA
Rules for classification: Tiebreakers
(P) Promoted
24 September 2026
20:45

Andorra	v	Malta
	Report

Estadi de la FAF, Encamp

1 October 2026
20:45

Malta	v	Gibraltar
	Report

National Stadium, Ta' Qali

4 October 2026
18:00

Malta	v	Andorra
	Report

National Stadium, Ta' Qali

16 November 2026
20:45

Gibraltar	v	Malta
	Report

Europa Sports Park, Gibraltar

===== Friendlies =====
27 September 2026 Friendly	Malta	v	Liechtenstein	Ta' Qali, Malta
18:30 UTC+2				Stadium: National Stadium

=== Malta women's national football team ===
==== Friendlies ====
9 October 2026 Friendly	Malta	v	Luxembourg	Ta' Qali, Malta
19:00 CET (UTC+01:00)				Stadium: Centenary Stadium

== League competitions (Men's) ==
League Division	Promoted to league ▲	Relegated from league ▼
Premier League	Balzan ▲; Birzebbuga St. Peter's ▲	Naxxar Lions ▼; Tarxien Rainbows ▼
Challenge League	Attard ▲; Victoria Hotspurs ▲	Marsa ▼; Mtarfa ▼
Amateur League	Dingli Swallows ▲; Kalkara United ▲	Kirkop ▼; Luqa St. Andrew's ▼; Xgħajra Tornados ▼; Żejtun Corinthians ▼

=== Premier League ===
The 2026-27 Maltese Premier League, known as the VBet Malta Premier for sponsorship reasons, features 12 teams competing in a split-season format. The season is divided into an Opening Round and a Closing Round, each consisting of an 11-match first phase followed by a second phase split into Top Six and Play-Out groups. Floriana entered the season as champions.

Pos	Team	Pld	W	D	L	GF	GA	GD	Pts	Qualification
1	Valletta	11	8	1	2	23	9	+14	25	Qualification for the Top Six
2	Marsaxlokk	11	6	2	3	21	14	+7	20	Qualification for the Top Six
3	Sliema Wanderers	11	5	3	3	15	14	+1	18	Qualification for the Top Six
4	Ħamrun Spartans	11	4	5	2	17	13	+4	17	Qualification for the Top Six
5	Floriana	11	4	4	3	22	15	+7	16	Qualification for the Top Six
6	Hibernians	11	4	4	3	13	15	−2	16	Qualification for the Top Six
7	Birkirkara	11	4	3	4	14	11	+3	15	Qualification for the Play-Out
8	Żabbar St. Patrick	11	4	2	5	17	16	+1	14	Qualification for the Play-Out
9	Mosta	11	3	5	3	15	20	−5	14	Qualification for the Play-Out
10	Balzan	11	2	5	4	13	14	−1	11	Qualification for the Play-Out
11	Birzebbuga St. Peter's	11	1	3	7	9	21	−12	6	Qualification for the Play-Out
12	Gżira United	11	0	5	6	9	26	−17	5	Qualification for the Play-Out

Rules for classification: 1) Points; 2) Head-to-head points; 3) Head-to-head goal difference; 4) Head-to-head goals scored; 5) Goal difference; 6) Goals scored; 7) Play-offs (only if needed to decide champions, teams for relegation or teams for UEFA competitions).

=== Challenge League ===
The 2026-27 Maltese Challenge League serves as the second division. The competition features 16 teams competing in a regular season followed by a split into Top Eight and Play-Out sections. The top two teams earn automatic promotion to the Premier League, with a third promotion spot available through playoffs.

Pos	Team	Pld	W	D	L	GF	GA	GD	Pts	Qualification
1	Attard	0	0	0	0	0	0	0	0	Qualification for the Top Eight
2	Fgura United	0	0	0	0	0	0	0	0	Qualification for the Top Eight
3	Gudja United	0	0	0	0	0	0	0	0	Qualification for the Top Eight
4	Melita	0	0	0	0	0	0	0	0	Qualification for the Top Eight
5	Mgarr United	0	0	0	0	0	0	0	0	Qualification for the Top Eight
6	Naxxar Lions	0	0	0	0	0	0	0	0	Qualification for the Top Eight
7	Pietà Hotspurs	0	0	0	0	0	0	0	0	Qualification for the Top Eight
8	Santa Lucia	0	0	0	0	0	0	0	0	Qualification for the Top Eight
9	Sirens	0	0	0	0	0	0	0	0	Qualification for the Play-Out
10	St. Andrews	0	0	0	0	0	0	0	0	Qualification for the Play-Out
11	Swieqi United	0	0	0	0	0	0	0	0	Qualification for the Play-Out
12	Tarxien Rainbows	0	0	0	0	0	0	0	0	Qualification for the Play-Out
13	Victoria Hotspurs	0	0	0	0	0	0	0	0	Qualification for the Play-Out
14	Vittoriosa Stars	0	0	0	0	0	0	0	0	Qualification for the Play-Out
15	Żebbuġ Rangers	0	0	0	0	0	0	0	0	Qualification for the Play-Out
16	Żurrieq	0	0	0	0	0	0	0	0	Qualification for the Play-Out

Updated to match(es) played on 11 September 2026. Source: Malta Football Association
Rules for classification: 1) Points; 2) Play-offs (only if needed to decide champions or teams for relegation).

=== National League ===
Pos	Team	Pld	W	D	L	GF	GA	GD	Pts	Qualification
1	Mellieħa	2	2	0	0	7	3	+4	6	Promotion to 2027-28 Challenge League
2	Qrendi	2	2	0	0	7	4	+3	6	Promotion to 2027-28 Challenge League
3	Qormi	2	1	1	0	7	2	+5	4	
4	Lija Athletic	2	1	1	0	3	2	+1	4	
5	Senglea Athletic	2	1	0	1	5	3	+2	3	
6	Dingli Swallows	2	1	0	1	3	2	+1	3	
7	Kalkara	2	1	0	1	6	6	0	3	
8	San Ġwann	2	1	0	1	1	2	−1	3	
9	Mqabba	2	0	2	0	3	3	0	2	
10	Mtarfa	2	0	0	2	0	6	−6	0	
11	Pembroke Athleta	2	0	0	2	2	9	−7	0	Relegation to 2027-28 National League II
12	Marsa	2	0	0	2	2	4	−2	−13	Relegation to 2027-28 National League II

Updated to match(es) played on 21 September 2026. Source:
Rules for classification: 1) Points; 2) Play-offs (only if needed to decide champions, relegation, or teams for relegation play-offs).

*Marsa where handed a 13 point deduction from the MFA Appeals Board

=== National League II ===
Pos	Team	Pld	W	D	L	GF	GA	GD	Pts	Qualification
1	Żejtun Corinthians	1	1	0	0	4	1	+3	3	Promotion to 2027-28 National League I
2	Gharghur	0	0	0	0	0	0	0	0	Promotion to 2027-28 National League I
3	Kirkop United	0	0	0	0	0	0	0	0	
4	Luqa St. Andrew's	0	0	0	0	0	0	0	0	
5	Marsaskala	0	0	0	0	0	0	0	0	
6	Mdina Knights	0	0	0	0	0	0	0	0	
7	Msida Saint-Joseph	0	0	0	0	0	0	0	0	
8	Rabat Ajax	0	0	0	0	0	0	0	0	
9	St. Venera Lightnings	0	0	0	0	0	0	0	0	
10	Siġġiewi	0	0	0	0	0	0	0	0	
11	St. George's	0	0	0	0	0	0	0	0	
12	Ta' Xbiex	0	0	0	0	0	0	0	0	
13	Xgħajra Tornados	0	0	0	0	0	0	0	0	Reapplication for 2027-28 National League II
14	Ghaxaq	1	0	0	1	1	4	−3	0	Reapplication for 2027-28 National League II

Updated to match(es) played on unknown. Source:
Rules for classification: 1) Points; 2) Play-offs (only if needed to decide champions, promotion, or candidates for reapplication).

== Cup competitions (Men's) ==
=== Super Cup ===
7 September 2026 Final	Floriana	0-2	Valletta	Ta' Qali
19:00 CEST (UTC+02:00)		Report	Drina 21' (o.g.); Zammit 61'	Stadium: Ta' Qali National Stadium; Referee: Glen Tonna

== League competitions (Women's) ==
=== Women's League ===
The 2026-27 Assikura Women's League is the top tier of women's football in Malta. The season begins on 17th September 2026 and concludes in May 2027. Six teams competed in a four-round format (each team playing 20 matches) after the league returned to six participants. The competition was sponsored by Assikura Insurance Brokers, who extended their partnership with the Malta FA the previous season.

Pos	Team	Pld	W	D	L	GF	GA	GD	Pts	Qualification
1	Swieqi United	3	2	0	1	9	2	+7	6	Qualification for the Champions League first qualifying round
2	Hibernians	3	2	0	1	8	4	+4	6	
3	Valletta	3	2	0	1	7	3	+4	6	
4	Mgarr United	3	2	0	1	5	3	+2	6	
5	Birkirkara	3	1	0	2	4	7	−3	3	
6	San Ġwann	3	0	0	3	1	15	−14	0	

Updated to match(es) played on 3 October 2026. Source:
Rules for classification: 1) Points; 2) Play-offs (only if needed to decide champions, relegation, or teams for relegation play-offs).

=== UEFA Women's Champions League ===
By virtue of winning the Women's League, Mgarr United qualified for the UEFA Women's Champions League entering the First qualifying round. Mġarr United won their first match again FC Flora 4-0 but were beaten by mini-tournament hosts Spartak Myjava 6-1 and were thus knocked out.

22 July 2026 First Qualifying Round Semi-Final	FC Flora	0-4	Mgarr United	Myjava
		Report	Presley 51', 59', 90+6'; Tullus 70' (o.g.)	Stadium: Stadium Myjava; Referee: (Azerbaijan) Farida Lutfaliyeva

25 July 2026 First Qualifying Round Final	Spartak Myjava	6-1	Mgarr United	Myjava
	Bogorová 12' (pen.); Kršiaková 18'; Vredíková 28'; Dvořáková 61'; Dougherty 67'; Mendez 82' (o.g.)	Report	Presley 42'	Stadium: Stadium Myjava; Referee: (Albania) Eglantina Pjetrushaj

== Cup competitions (Women's) ==
=== Women's Super Cup ===
Mgarr United defeated Swieqi United after extra time to take the Womens Super Cup.

11 September 2026 Final	Mgarr United	4-1 (a.e.t.)	Swieqi United	Ta' Qali
19:00 CEST (UTC+02:00)	Yulya Carella 39', 96'; Alejandra Villegas Caly 110'; Yanina Ayeelen Mendez 113'	Report	Valentina Rapa 21'	Stadium: Centenary Stadium; Referee: Adam Brighton
