= 2026–27 Maltese National League II =

Maltese National League II
- Season: 2026–27
- Dates: 11 September 2026 – April 2027
- All statistics correct as of 12 September 2026.

The 2026–27 Maltese National League II (referred to, for sponsorship reasons, as the BOV National League II) occurs between September 2026 and April 2027. This will be the third season since the fourth division returned after four years with three levels of the Football Division League system. The Maltese National League II is Malta's fourth-highest professional football division. The 2026-27 League winners will be promoted to the Maltese National Amateur League. In the previous two seasons, two clubs would be promoted and four would be relegated to the division from the National Amateur League, however, from this season onwards, all leagues in the pyramids from tiers one through to four will be harmonized so that only two clubs will be promoted or relegated from any league.

== Team changes ==
The following teams have changed divisions since the 2025–26 season:

Promoted to 2026-27 National League	Relegated from 2025–26 Maltese National Amateur League
Dingli Swallows ▲; Kalkara United ▲	Kirkop ▼; Luqa St. Andrew's ▼; Xgħajra Tornados ▼; Żejtun Corinthians ▼

== Teams ==
Fourteen teams will compete in the 2026-27 League, up from twelve teams during the previous season.

Location of clubs that play in the 2026-27 League

Team	Location	Manager
Għargħur	Għargħur	(Malta) Alan Friggieri
Għaxaq	Għaxaq	(Malta) Johann Zammit
Kirkop United	Kirkop	(Malta) David James Saliba
Luqa St. Andrew's	Luqa	(Malta) Lydon Fenech
Marsaskala	Marsaskala	(Malta) Roger Mifsud
Mdina Knights	Mdina	(Malta) Marco Buttigieg
Msida Saint-Joseph	Msida	(Malta) Neville Galea
Rabat Ajax	Rabat	(Malta) Jesmond Zammit
Santa Venera Lightnings	Santa Venera	(Malta) Jeffrey Chetcuti
Siġġiewi	Siġġiewi	(Malta) Simon Agius
St. George's	Cospicua	(Malta) Jamie Pace
Ta' Xbiex	Ta' Xbiex	(Germany) Thomas Westphal
Xgħajra Tornados	Xghajra	(Malta) Paul Bugeja
Żejtun Corinthians	Zejtun	(Malta) Ivan Zammit

== Venues ==
The following venues have been cleared for use throughout the season:

Pembroke	Mosta	Location of host stadia during the 2026-27 Maltese National League II
Luxol Stadium	Charles Abela Stadium	Location of host stadia during the 2026-27 Maltese National League II
Capacity: 600	Capacity: 700	Location of host stadia during the 2026-27 Maltese National League II
St. Paul's Bay	Ta' Qali	Location of host stadia during the 2026-27 Maltese National League II
Sirens Stadium	Centenary Stadium	Location of host stadia during the 2026-27 Maltese National League II
Capacity: 800	Capacity: 3,000	Location of host stadia during the 2026-27 Maltese National League II

== Table ==
=== Regular season ===
Pos	Team	Pld	W	D	L	GF	GA	GD	Pts	Qualification
1	Żejtun Corinthians	1	1	0	0	4	1	+3	3	Promotion to 2027-28 National League I
2	Gharghur	0	0	0	0	0	0	0	0	Promotion to 2027-28 National League I
3	Kirkop United	0	0	0	0	0	0	0	0	
4	Luqa St. Andrew's	0	0	0	0	0	0	0	0	
5	Marsaskala	0	0	0	0	0	0	0	0	
6	Mdina Knights	0	0	0	0	0	0	0	0	
7	Msida Saint-Joseph	0	0	0	0	0	0	0	0	
8	Rabat Ajax	0	0	0	0	0	0	0	0	
9	St. Venera Lightnings	0	0	0	0	0	0	0	0	
10	Siġġiewi	0	0	0	0	0	0	0	0	
11	St. George's	0	0	0	0	0	0	0	0	
12	Ta' Xbiex	0	0	0	0	0	0	0	0	
13	Xgħajra Tornados	0	0	0	0	0	0	0	0	Reapplication for 2027-28 National League II
14	Ghaxaq	1	0	0	1	1	4	−3	0	Reapplication for 2027-28 National League II

Updated to match(es) played on unknown. Source:
Rules for classification: 1) Points; 2) Play-offs (only if needed to decide champions, promotion, or candidates for reapplication).

=== Results ===
Home \ Away	GHR	GHX	KRK	LQA	MRK	MDI	MSJ	RBT	SVL	SIG	STG	XBX	XJR	ZEJ
Gharghur	—													
Ghaxaq		—												1–4
Kirkop United			—											
Luqa St. Andrew's				—										
Marsaskala					—									
Mdina Knights						—								
Msida Saint-Joseph							—							
Rabat Ajax								—						
St. Venera Lightnings									—					
Siġġiewi										—				
St. George's											—			
Ta' Xbiex												—		
Xgħajra Tornados													—	
Żejtun Corinthians														—

Updated to match(es) played on 12 September 2026. Source:
Legend: Blue = home team win; Yellow = draw; Red = away team win.
