= 2025–26 Maltese National Amateur League II =

Maltese National Amateur League II
- Season: 2025–26
- Dates: 20 September 2025 – April 2026
- Champions: Kalkara United
- Promoted: Dingli Swallows
- Matches: 142
- Goals: 410 (2.89 per match)
- All statistics correct as of 18 July 2025.

The 2025–26 Maltese National Amateur League II (referred to, for sponsorship reasons, as the BOV National Amateur League II) occurs between September 2025 and April 2026. This will be the second season since the fourth division returned after four years with three levels of the Football Division League system. The Maltese National Amateur League II is Malta's fourth-highest professional football division. The 2025-26 League winners will be promoted to the Maltese National Amateur League.

Victoria Hotspurs from Gozo won the inaugural season of the Maltese National Amateur League II in their first season as a member of Malta Football Association and were promoted to the Maltese National Amateur League. They were joined in the third tier by Mqabba.

== Team changes ==
The following teams have changed divisions since the 2024–25 season:

Relegated from
2024–25 Maltese National Amateur League
Gharghur
Marsaskala
Msida Saint-Joseph
Rabat Ajax

== Teams ==
Twelve teams will compete in the 2025-26 League, up from 10 teams during the previous season.

Location of clubs that play in the 2025-26 League

Team	Location	Manager
Dingli Swallows	Dingli	(Malta) Nicolai Caruana
Għaxaq	Għaxaq	(Malta) Conrad Debattista
Għargħur	Għargħur	
Kalkara United	Kalkara	(Brazil) Bruno Menezes Pinheiro
Marsaskala	Marsaskala	
Mdina Knights	Mdina	(Romania) Constantin Cristinel Cretu
Msida Saint-Joseph	Msida	
Rabat Ajax	Rabat	
Santa Venera Lightnings	Santa Venera	(Malta) Kurt James
Siġġiewi	Siġġiewi	(Malta) Simon Agius
St. George's	Cospicua	(Malta) Edmond Lufi
Ta' Xbiex	Ta' Xbiex	(Malta) Marc Psaila Soler

== Venues ==
Pembroke	Mosta	Location of host stadia during the 2025-26 Maltese National Amateur League II
Luxol Stadium	Charles Abela Stadium	Location of host stadia during the 2025-26 Maltese National Amateur League II
Capacity: 600	Capacity: 700	Location of host stadia during the 2025-26 Maltese National Amateur League II
St. Paul's Bay	Ta' Qali	Location of host stadia during the 2025-26 Maltese National Amateur League II
Sirens Stadium	Centenary Stadium	Location of host stadia during the 2025-26 Maltese National Amateur League II
Capacity: 800	Capacity: 3,000	Location of host stadia during the 2025-26 Maltese National Amateur League II

== Table ==
=== Regular season ===
Pos	Team	Pld	W	D	L	GF	GA	GD	Pts	Qualification
1	Kalkara United (C, P)	22	17	2	3	58	16	+42	53	Promotion to 2026/27 National Amateur League I
2	Dingli Swallows (P)	22	15	4	3	45	12	+33	49	Promotion to 2026/27 National Amateur League I
3	Msida Saint-Joseph	22	14	6	2	47	19	+28	48	
4	Ta' Xbiex	22	13	4	5	38	17	+21	43	
5	Mdina Knights	22	12	5	5	45	22	+23	41	
6	Siġġiewi	22	10	2	10	34	44	−10	32	
7	St. George's	22	8	3	11	28	30	−2	27	
8	Rabat Ajax	22	8	2	12	35	48	−13	26	
9	Marsaskala	22	4	5	13	27	46	−19	17	
10	Gharghur	22	4	5	13	16	41	−25	17	
11	St. Venera Lightnings	22	3	2	17	21	58	−37	11	
12	Ghaxaq	22	3	2	17	16	57	−41	11	

Updated to match(es) played on 19 April 2026. Source:
Rules for classification: 1) Points; 2) Play-offs (only if needed to decide champions, relegation, or teams for relegation play-offs).
(C) Champions; (P) Promoted

=== Results ===
Home \ Away	DIN	GHX	GHR	KLK	MRK	MDI	MSJ	RBT	SVL	SIG	STG	XBX
Dingli Swallows	—	1–0	4–1	1–2	2–0	1–0	2–1	0–0	3–0	2–0	1–0	1–1
Ghaxaq	0–6	—	1–2	0–3	2–2	1–5	0–5	1–3	0–3	1–4	1–0	1–5
Gharghur	0–0	2–1	—	0–4	1–2	0–3	0–2	0–2	1–0	2–2	2–0	1–3
Kalkara United	2–0	4–0	3–0	—	2–2	1–0	0–1	3–2	7–0	3–0	1–0	1–0
Marsaskala	1–3	0–1	0–0	0–4	—	2–2	2–2	0–3	5–1	0–4	3–4	0–1
Mdina Knights	0–1	1–1	1–0	3–1	4–2	—	1–1	3–2	2–3	0–1	1–0	1–0
Msida Saint-Joseph	1–0	1–0	3–0	2–1	2–1	2–2	—	2–1	4–1	4–0	1–2	2–0
Rabat Ajax	1–4	2–1	2–0	2–9	3–1	1–3	2–4	—	3–1	0–4	0–3	1–2
St. Venera Lightnings	0–6	2–1	1–1	2–3	0–1	0–4	1–3	1–1	—	0–1	1–3	1–2
Siġġiewi	1–0	1–2	2–1	1–2	2–1	1–7	1–3	4–2	3–2	—	0–2	0–2
St. George's	1–4	2–0	2–2	0–2	0–1	0–1	1–1	2–0	3–1	1–1	—	1–3
Ta' Xbiex	0–2	3–1	3–0	0–0	3–1	1–1	0–0	0–2	1–0	5–0	2–0	—

Updated to match(es) played on 19 April 2026. Source:
Legend: Blue = home team win; Yellow = draw; Red = away team win.
