= 2026–27 National League I (Malta) =

Maltese National League
- Season: 2026–27
- Dates: 18 September 2026 – 11 May 2027
- Matches: 20
- Goals: 67 (3.35 per match)
- Top goalscorer: Taiwo David Akindele (5); David Garba Emmanuel (5)
- Biggest home win: Kalkara 5-1 Pembroke
- Biggest away win: Pembroke 0-5 Qormi
- Highest scoring: Kalkara 3-4 Mellieha
- All statistics correct as of 20 October 2026.

The 2026–27 Maltese National League (referred to, for sponsorship reasons, as the BOV National League 1) occurs between 18 September 2026 and May 2027. This will be the third season since the Amateur League was split and the league system returned into two tiers since the 2019–20 season. Attard were crowned champions, earning the right to play in the 2026-27 Challenge League.

Macron will provide the match footballs this season.

== Team changes ==
The following teams have changed divisions since the 2025–26 season:

Promoted from 2025–26 Maltese National Amateur League II	Relegated from 2025–26 Maltese Challenge League	Relegated to 2026–27 Maltese National League II	Promoted to 2026–27 Maltese Challenge League
Kalkara ▲ Dingli S. ▲	Marsa ▼ Mtarfa ▼	Żejtun C. ▼ Xgħajra T. ▼ Luqa SA ▼ Kirkop U. ▼	Attard ▲ Victoria H. ▲

== Teams ==
Twelve teams will compete in the 2026-27 National League I.

Location of Maltese clubs playing in the BOV National League 1

Team	Location	Manager	Kit Manufacturer
Dingli Swallows	Dingli	(Malta) Nicolai Caruana	(Germany) Adidas
Kalkara United	Kalkara	(Brazil) Bruno Menezes Pinheiro	(Italy) Givova
Lija Athletic	Lija	(Malta) Joseph Galea	(Italy) Macron
Marsa	Marsa	(Malta) Keith Darmanin	(Italy) Givova
Mtarfa	Mtarfa	(Croatia) Davor Filipović	(Italy) Acerbis
Mellieħa	Mellieħa	(Montenegro) Vesko Petrović	(Italy) Macron
Mqabba	Mqabba	(Malta) George Magri	(Germany) Hummel
Pembroke Athleta	Pembroke	(Malta) Jeffrey Fenech	(Italy) Macron
Qormi	Qormi	(Malta) Clive Mizzi	(Spain) Joma
Qrendi	Qrendi	(Malta) Conrad Debattista	(Italy) Macron
San Ġwann	San Ġwann	(Malta) Noel Turner	(Italy) Zeus
Senglea Athletic	Senglea	(Malta) Edmond Lufi	(Italy) Givova

== Venues ==
The following venues have been cleared for use throughout the season:

Ta' Qali	Hamrun	Location of host stadia during the 2026-27 Maltese National League I
Centenary Stadium	Victor Tedesco Stadium	Location of host stadia during the 2026-27 Maltese National League I
Capacity: 1,732	Capacity: 1,962	Location of host stadia during the 2026-27 Maltese National League I
St. Paul's Bay	Mosta	Pembroke
Sirens Stadium	Charles Abela Memorial Stadium	Luxol Stadium
Capacity: 1,024	Capacity: 700	Capacity: 702

== Regular season ==
During the regular season, each team plays each other twice in a round robin format. The top two teams will be promoted to the Challenge League for the following season, while the bottom two teams will be relegated to the National League II.

=== League stage ===
Pos	Team	Pld	W	D	L	GF	GA	GD	Pts	Qualification
1	Mellieħa	2	2	0	0	7	3	+4	6	Promotion to 2027-28 Challenge League
2	Qrendi	2	2	0	0	7	4	+3	6	Promotion to 2027-28 Challenge League
3	Qormi	2	1	1	0	7	2	+5	4	
4	Lija Athletic	2	1	1	0	3	2	+1	4	
5	Senglea Athletic	2	1	0	1	5	3	+2	3	
6	Dingli Swallows	2	1	0	1	3	2	+1	3	
7	Kalkara	2	1	0	1	6	6	0	3	
8	San Ġwann	2	1	0	1	1	2	−1	3	
9	Mqabba	2	0	2	0	3	3	0	2	
10	Mtarfa	2	0	0	2	0	6	−6	0	
11	Pembroke Athleta	2	0	0	2	2	9	−7	0	Relegation to 2027-28 National League II
12	Marsa	2	0	0	2	2	4	−2	−13	Relegation to 2027-28 National League II

Updated to match(es) played on 21 September 2026. Source:
Rules for classification: 1) Points; 2) Play-offs (only if needed to decide champions, relegation, or teams for relegation play-offs).

*Marsa where handed a 13 point deduction from the MFA Appeals Board

== Results ==
Home \ Away	DIN	KAL	LJA	MRS	MLH	MQA	MTF	PBK	QOR	QRE	SGN	SEN
Dingli Swallows	—						—		0–2		2–0	
Kalkara		—			3–4		—	5–1				
Lija Athletic	2–1		—	1–1			—					
Marsa		2–3		—	2–3		—					
Mellieħa					—		—					1–0
Mqabba			1–1			—	—			1–1		
Mtarfa	—	—	—	—	—	—	—	—	—	—	—	—
Pembroke Athleta							—	—	0–5			
Qormi						2–2	—		—		2–0	
Qrendi	0–1						—	4–2		—		
San Ġwann			2–1	1–0			—				—	
Senglea Athletic		3–0					—			2–3		—

Updated to match(es) played on 20 October 2026. Source:
Legend: Blue = home team win; Yellow = draw; Red = away team win.

*Mtarfa where withdrawn from the league due to multiple walkovers
