= 2025–26 Maltese National Amateur League =

Maltese National Amateur League
- Season: 2025–26
- Dates: 19 September 2025 – 11 May 2026
- Champions: Attard
- Promoted: Victoria Hotspurs
- Relegated: Xghajra T. Kirkop U. Luqa SA; Zejtun C.
- Matches: 187
- Goals: 586 (3.13 per match)
- Top goalscorer: Precious Uchechukwu Nwankwo; Attard (32 goals)
- Biggest home win: Qormi 5-0 Zejtun C. Qormi 5-0 Lija A. Victoria H. 5-0 Lija A. Mqabba 5-0 San Ġwann
- Biggest away win: San Ġwann 0-5 Xgħajra T. Kirkop U. 0-5 Qormi; Mellieha 0-5 Qormi; Qrendi 0-5 Lija A.
- Highest scoring: Qormi 4-7 Attard; Attard 6-5 Zejtun C.
- Longest winning run: Lija A. / Victoria H. (6)
- Longest unbeaten run: Lija A. / Victoria H. (12)
- Longest winless run: Senglea A. / Mellieha (11)
- Longest losing run: Senglea A. (9)
- All statistics correct as of 4 May 2026.

The 2025–26 Maltese National Amateur League (referred to, for sponsorship reasons, as the BOV National Amateur League) occurs between 20 September 2025 and April 2026. This will be the second season since the Amateur League was split and the league system returned into two tiers since the 2019–20 season. Attard were crowned champions, earning the right to play in the 2026-27 Challenge League.

Macron will provide the match footballs this season.

== Team changes ==
The following teams have changed divisions since the 2024–25 season:

Promoted from 2024–25 Maltese National Amateur League II	Relegated from 2024–25 Maltese Challenge League	Relegated to 2025–26 Maltese National Amateur League II	Promoted to 2025–26 Maltese Challenge League
Mqabba; Victoria Hotspurs	Lija Athletic; Senglea Athletic	Gharghur; Marsaskala; Msida Saint-Joseph; Rabat Ajax	Birzebbuga; Vittoriosa

== Teams ==
Fourteen teams competed in the 2025-26 League. Victoria Hotspurs became the first Gozitan club to reach the third tier of Maltese football since the, now defunct, Gozo F.C. played in the old Second Division in 2006-07.

Location of Maltese clubs playing in the BOV Amateur League 1

Team	Location	Manager
Attard	Attard	(Malta) Daniel Agius
Kirkop United	Kirkop	(Malta) David James Saliba
Lija Athletic	Lija	(Malta) Ivan Zammit
Luqa St. Andrew's	Luqa	(Malta) Paul Bugeja
Mellieħa	Mellieħa	(Montenegro) Vesko Petrović
Mqabba	Mqabba	(Malta) George Magri
Pembroke Athleta	Pembroke	(Malta) Jeffrey Mifsud
Qormi	Qormi	(Malta) Clive Mizzi
Qrendi	Qrendi	(Malta) Alfred Attard
San Ġwann	San Ġwann	(Malta) Xavier Saliba
Senglea Athletic	Senglea	(Malta) Edmond Lufi
Victoria Hotspurs	Victoria	(Malta) Oliver Spiteri
Xgħajra Tornados	Xghajra	(Malta) Keith Darmanin
Żejtun Corinthians	Zejtun	(Malta) Paul Falzon

== Venues ==
Ta' Qali	Hamrun	Location of host stadia during the 2025-26 Maltese National Amateur League
Centenary Stadium	Victor Tedesco Stadium	Location of host stadia during the 2025-26 Maltese National Amateur League
Capacity: 1,732	Capacity: 1,962	Location of host stadia during the 2025-26 Maltese National Amateur League
St. Paul's Bay	Mosta	Pembroke
Sirens Stadium	Charles Abela Memorial Stadium	Luxol Stadium
Capacity: 1,024	Capacity: 700	Capacity: 702

== Regular season ==
During the regular season, each team plays each other twice in a round robin format. The top two teams will be promoted to the Challenge League for the following season, while the bottom four teams will be relegated to the National Amateur League II.

=== League stage ===
Pos	Team	Pld	W	D	L	GF	GA	GD	Pts	Qualification
1	Attard (C, P)	26	20	3	3	73	38	+35	63	Promotion to 2026-27 Challenge League
2	Victoria Hotspurs (P)	26	17	3	6	51	24	+27	54	Promotion to 2026-27 Challenge League
3	Qormi	26	17	1	8	60	26	+34	52	
4	Lija Athletic	26	15	4	7	48	35	+13	49	
5	Mqabba	26	14	6	6	47	27	+20	48	
6	San Ġwann	26	9	6	11	29	41	−12	33	
7	Senglea Athletic	26	9	4	13	35	49	−14	31	
8	Mellieħa	26	9	3	14	25	38	−13	30	
9	Qrendi	26	8	6	12	33	48	−15	30	
10	Pembroke Athleta	26	8	4	14	34	44	−10	28	
11	Xgħajra Tornados (R)	26	7	7	12	36	48	−12	28	Relegation to 2026-27 National Amateur League II
12	Kirkop United (R)	26	5	10	11	31	38	−7	25	Relegation to 2026-27 National Amateur League II
13	Żejtun Corinthians (R)	26	6	4	16	32	49	−17	22	Relegation to 2026-27 National Amateur League II
14	Luqa St. Andrew's (R)	26	6	3	17	29	58	−29	21	Relegation to 2026-27 National Amateur League II

Updated to match(es) played on 29 April 2026. Source:
Rules for classification: 1) Points; 2) Play-offs (only if needed to decide champions, relegation, or teams for relegation play-offs).
(C) Champions; (P) Promoted; (R) Relegated

== Results ==
Home \ Away	ATT	KRK	LJA	LQA	MQA	MLH	PBK	QOR	QRE	SGN	SEN	VCT	XJR	ZEJ
Attard	—	1–1	3–1	2–0	2–1	2–1	2–1	1–0	3–1	2–0	1–1	2–1	2–3	6–5
Kirkop United	4–4	—	1–1	1–1	2–2	0–1	0–1	0–5	3–1	0–1	2–2	3–1	0–2	0–1
Lija Athletic	4–1	2–1	—	2–1	0–1	1–0	4–1	2–4	2–0	4–3	1–2	2–0	3–0	1–2
Luqa St. Andrew's	1–4	2–5	1–1	—	2–3	0–3	0–3	0–4	3–1	0–2	2–0	0–3	3–0	1–2
Mqabba	1–2	2–0	1–2	3–2	—	2–0	0–3	1–0	4–1	5–0	0–0	1–2	4–0	3–1
Mellieħa	1–5	0–0	1–1	1–0	1–2	—	1–0	0–5	3–1	0–1	2–1	1–0	1–1	2–1
Pembroke Athleta	2–3	0–0	1–3	4–1	0–2	2–1	—	0–2	2–5	0–3	2–0	1–2	2–4	2–1
Qormi	4–7	2–0	5–0	0–1	2–2	3–1	2–1	—	0–1	2–1	2–1	3–1	1–0	5–0
Qrendi	0–4	0–0	0–5	0–0	0–0	3–0	0–0	1–0	—	1–0	2–3	1–4	1–2	1–1
San Ġwann	0–3	1–1	0–0	6–2	2–0	1–0	1–1	1–0	1–2	—	0–3	0–3	0–5	2–1
Senglea Athletic	1–3	2–0	0–2	2–1	1–2	2–1	2–1	0–4	2–6	3–0	—	0–4	1–1	0–2
Victoria Hotspurs	1–0	3–2	5–0	4–1	0–0	1–0	3–1	2–0	2–0	1–1	1–3	—	2–2	1–0
Xgħajra Tornados	1–4	0–4	0–1	1–2	0–3	2–3	1–1	1–2	3–3	1–1	4–2	0–2	—	2–1
Żejtun Corinthians	2–4	0–1	1–3	1–2	2–2	1–0	1–2	1–3	1–2	1–1	3–1	0–2	0–0	—

Updated to match(es) played on 27 April 2026. Source:
Legend: Blue = home team win; Yellow = draw; Red = away team win.

=== Relegation Playoff ===
Due to Pembroke Athleta and Xghajra Tornados both finishing equal on points, a playoff was required to take place to determine who finished in tenth and eleventh positions and got the fourth and final relegation place. Pembroke saved their status with Brazilian forward Weverton Gomes scoring the only goal of the match, while Xghajra were relegated to the National Amateur League 2.

09/05/2026 16:00	Pembroke Athleta	1-0	Xgħajra Tornados	Ħamrun, Malta
	Weverton 65'	Report		Stadium: Victor Tedesco Stadium; Referee: Anthony Paul Vella (Malta)

== Top Scorers ==
Rank	Player	Club	Goals
1	(Nigeria) Precious Uchechukwu Nwankwo	Attard	32
2	(Nigeria) David Garba Emmanuel	Qormi	18
3	(Serbia) Luka Mijic	Mqabba	17
4	(Brazil) Rondinely Roberto Monteiro	Victoria Hotspurs	15
5	(Malta) Nicholas Schembri	Attard	15
