= 2021–22 Maltese National Amateur League =

2nd season of the Maltese National Amateur League

Maltese National Amateur League
- Season: 2021–22
- Dates: 17 September 2021 – 16 April 2022
- Champions: Żurrieq
- Promoted: Attard; Marsaskala; Mtarfa
- Matches: 170
- Goals: 491 (2.89 per match)
- Top goalscorer: Nicholas Schembri (21)
- Highest scoring: Ta' Xbiex 2–7 Xgħajra Tornados
- Longest winning run: 8 matches Attard
- Longest unbeaten run: 18 matches Attard
- Longest winless run: 10 matches Ta' Xbiex
- Longest losing run: 6 matches Dingli Swallows
- All statistics correct as of 10 April 2022.

The 2021–22 Maltese National Amateur League (referred to, for sponsorship reasons, as the BOV National Amateur League), was the third-level league football in Malta. This is the second season since the unification of both the Second and Third Divisions into the three-group Amateur League system. Żurrieq won the title by beating fellow group winners Attard in the championship final. The second-placed promotion play-off saw Marsaskala defeat Għargħur by 2 goals to 1 with Għargħur facing Mtarfa in the promotion play-off final. Mtarfa won all four of their post-league stage games, in the process winning the play-off final against Għargħur to win promotion to the Challenge League.

== Teams ==
Nineteen teams are competing in the league. These were split into two groups, one group of ten and another of nine. The top team from each group will be promoted with another team to be promoted emerging from the play-offs, a deciding match with the winner of each group being declared the champion of the league. The clubs placed second in each group shall play a deciding promotion play-off match and the winner shall be promoted to the Challenge League. The losing side will play in the final of the play-offs. The play-offs will start with the fifth placed team from group A playing with fourth placed side from group B and vice versa. The winners from the first round will play the third placed clubs in either group. The second round winners will play each other in the third round with the winners of that contest going on to play the runners-up from the promotion final.

Team	Location	Stadium	Capacity
Attard	Attard	Sirens Stadium	1,500
Birżebbuġa	Birżebbuġa	Centenary Stadium	2,000
Dingli Swallows	Ħad-Dingli	Tartarni Ground	500
Għargħur	Għargħur	Għargħur Stadium	800
Għaxaq	Għaxaq	Għaxaq Stadium	300
Kalkara	Kalkara	Luxol Sports Ground	800
Kirkop United	Ħal Kirkop	Centenary Stadium	2,000
Marsaskala	Marsaskala	Luxol Sports Ground	800
Mdina Knights	Mdina Knights	Centenary Stadium	2,000
Mellieħa	Mellieħa	Mellieħa Sports Complex	400
Msida St. Joseph	Msida	Victor Tedesco Stadium	6,000
Mtarfa	Mtarfa	Mtarfa Ground	150
Qormi	Qormi	Thomaso Ground	500
Siġġiewi	Siġġiewi	Siġġiewi Ground	240
St. Venera	Santa Venera	Santa Venera Lightnings Training Centre	800
Ta' Xbiex	Ta' Xbiex		
Xgħajra Tornados	Xgħajra	Xgħajra Tornados Ground	200
Żabbar St. Patrick	Ħaż-Żabbar	Il-Foss	1,000
Żurrieq	Żurrieq	Żurrieq Football Ground	100

== League stage ==
=== Group A ===
Pos	Team	Pld	W	D	L	GF	GA	GD	Pts	Qualification or relegation
1	Attard (P)	18	16	2	0	46	3	+43	41 (Note: Attard received a 9 point deduction after an ex-committee member pleaded guilty to attempting to fix a match the previous season.)	Promotion to the 2022–23 Maltese Challenge League
2	Għargħur (Q)	18	8	7	3	24	12	+12	31	Qualification for the promotion play-off
3	Birżebbuġa (Q)	18	8	6	4	21	12	+9	30	Qualification for the play-offs 2nd round
4	Kalkara (Q)	18	8	4	6	31	19	+12	28	Qualification for the play-offs 1st round
5	Msida St. Joseph (Q)	18	6	8	4	23	23	0	26	Qualification for the play-offs 1st round
6	Xgħajra Tornados	18	7	3	8	28	29	−1	24	
7	Siġġiewi	18	3	6	9	18	37	−19	15	
8	Għaxaq	18	5	2	11	22	33	−11	17	
9	Ta' Xbiex	18	3	4	11	18	44	−26	13	
10	Dingli Swallows	18	2	6	10	19	38	−19	12	

Updated to match(es) played on 10 April 2022. Source:
Rules for classification: 1) Points;
(P) Promoted; (Q) Qualified for the phase indicated

=== Group B ===
Pos	Team	Pld	W	D	L	GF	GA	GD	Pts	Qualification or relegation
1	Żurrieq (C)	16	12	3	1	36	10	+26	39	Promotion to the 2022–23 Maltese Challenge League
2	Marsaskala (P)	16	12	2	2	29	11	+18	38	Qualification for the promotion play-off
3	Żabbar St. Patrick (Q)	16	11	2	3	42	15	+27	35	Qualification for the play-offs 2nd round
4	Mtarfa (P)	16	11	1	4	29	24	+5	34	Qualification for the play-offs 1st round
5	Mdina Knights (Q)	16	6	0	10	14	27	−13	18	Qualification for the play-offs 1st round
6	Mellieħa	16	4	1	11	16	31	−15	13	
7	Kirkop United	16	3	2	11	14	26	−12	11	
8	Qormi	16	2	4	10	14	32	−18	10	
9	St. Venera	16	2	3	11	13	31	−18	9	

Updated to match(es) played on 10 April 2022. Source:
Rules for classification: 1) Points;
(C) Champions; (P) Promoted; (Q) Qualified for the phase indicated

== Results ==
=== National Amateur League group A results ===
Home \ Away	ATT	BSP	DIN	GHA	GFC	KLK	MSJ	SGI	TXB	XTF
Attard	—	3–0	3–0	1–1	1–0	1–4	3–0	3–0	5–0	1–0
Birżebbuġa	0–1	—	1–0	0–0	4–1	1–4	0–0	0–0	3–0	3–0
Dingli Swallows	0–3	1–1	—	2–2	2–1	1–2	2–2	4–5	0–0	1–2
Għargħur	0–0	1–0	5–1	—	2–0	0–3	0–0	2–0	0–2	2–0
Għaxaq	1–0	0–1	5–1	0–2	—	0–0	1–2	2–1	2–0	3–0
Kalkara	0–2	1–1	3–1	1–3	0–4	—	0–1	0–1	2–0	4–1
Msida St. Joseph	0–3	0–0	3–0	0–3	2–0	1–1	—	2–0	3–3	1–3
Siġġiewi	0–1	0–3	0–1	1–1	2–1	1–1	2–2	—	2–2	0–2
Ta' Xbiex	0–2	0–4	4–2	0–4	1–1	0–2	0–2	2–2	—	2–7
Xgħajra Tornados	1–4	0–1	1–1	2–1	1–1	2–1	2–2	4–1	0–2	—

Updated to match(es) played on 10 April 2022. Source:
Legend: Blue = home team win; Yellow = draw; Red = away team win.

=== National Amateur League group B results ===
Home \ Away	KIR	MSK	MDK	MSC	MTA	QOR	STV	ZAB	ZRR
Kirkop United	—	0–3	0–1	0–2	0–1	2–2	3–1	0–2	0–1
Marsaskala	1–1	—	2–0	1–0	0–1	1–0	2–0	0–4	3–0
Mdina Knights	2–1	1–2	—	3–0	1–3	0–2	2–0	0–2	0–5
Mellieħa	0–1	1–4	0–1	—	0–2	4–2	3–2	1–2	0–2
Mtarfa	3–1	0–1	1–0	3–1	—	4–0	2–2	3–2	1–3
Qormi	1–3	2–3	1–0	0–3	1–2	—	0–0	1–4	1–1
St. Venera	2–0	0–4	1–2	1–1	0–1	2–0	—	0–4	1–3
Żabbar St. Patrick	2–1	1–2	5–0	4–0	5–2	1–1	2–1	—	2–3
Żurrieq	2–1	0–0	2–1	3–0	7–0	2–0	2–0	0–0	—

Updated to match(es) played on 10 April 2022. Source:
Legend: Blue = home team win; Yellow = draw; Red = away team win.

== Promotion play-offs ==
=== Second-place promotion decider ===
2 April 2022	Għargħur	1 - 2	Marsaskala	Pembroke
	Formosa (yellow card) 11', (goal) 77'; Scholey (yellow card) 77'	Report	Zammit 43', 88', (yellow card) 88'	Stadium: Luxol Stadium

=== Play-offs ===
Quarterfinals
4a	Kalkara	5
5b	Mdina Knights	1
4b	Mtarfa	3
5a	Msida St Joseph	1

Semifinals
3b	Zabbar St. Patrick	3
4a	Kalkara	1
3a	Birzebbuga St. Peter's	1
4b	Mtarfa	3

Finals
3b	Zabbar St. Patrick	2
4b	Mtarfa	3

=== Quarter-finals ===
3 April 2022	Kalkara	5 - 1	Mdina Knights	Pembroke
	G Vella 9' (o.g.); Ahmad 18'; Pisani 30'; Degiorgio 53'; Orban 69'; J Vella (yellow card) 83'	Report	Doric (yellow card) 50'; Borg 61' (pen.); Saliba (yellow card) 83'	Stadium: Luxol Stadium

3 April 2022	Mtarfa	3 - 1	Msida St. Joseph	Pembroke
	Zammit 11' (pen.); Silva 69'; DD Camilleri 85'	Report	Gauci (yellow card) 10'; Borg (yellow card) 36'; J Camilleri 59'; Chircop (yellow card) 80'	Stadium: Luxol Stadium

=== Semi-finals ===
9 April 2022	Żabbar St. Patrick	3 - 1	Kalkara	St Paul's Bay
	Souzaa 15'; Abela 61'; Tanti (yellow card) 78'; Benhamed (yellow card) 86'; Zammit 90+3'	Report	Ahmad 65'	Stadium: Sirens Stadium

9 April 2022	Birżebbuġa	1 - 3	Mtarfa	St Paul's Bay
	Ubuwere (yellow card) 34'; Agius 49', (yellow card) 80'; Micallef (red card) 89'	Report	Camilleri (yellow card) 51'; Silva (yellow card) 62'; Mifsud 66'; Brincat 67', 75'; Bartolo (yellow card) 90+2'	Stadium: Sirens Stadium

=== Play-offs final ===
13 April 2022	Żabbar St. Patrick	2 - 3	Mtarfa	Ta' Qali
	Aquilina 10', 90+2'; Gusman (yellow card) 40'; Ciantar (yellow card) 63'; Fava (yellow card) 87'; Benhamed (yellow card) 90+3'; Triganza (yellow card) 90+4'	Report	Brincat (yellow card) 11', (goal) 61'; Bartolo (yellow card) 15'; K Zammit 41', 54'; Caruana (yellow card) 80'; Borg (yellow card) 87'; Agius (yellow card) 90+3'	Stadium: Centenary Stadium

=== Promotion final ===
16 April 2022	Mtarfa	4 - 1	Għargħur	Ta' Qali
	Silva 26', 44', 79' (pen.); D.D. Camilleri (yellow card) 51'; D. Cremona (yellow card) 58'; Brincat 73'; J.P. Formosa (yellow card) 80'	Report	Igwemeke (yellow card) 31'; N. Formosa 45+2', (yellow card) 89'; R.G. CAmilleri (yellow card) 84'	Stadium: Centenary Stadium

== Championship play-offs ==
=== Championship final ===
10 April 2022	Attard	1 - 2	Żurrieq	Ħamrun
	Spiteri 21'; Fedele (yellow card) 90+1'	Report	Caruana (yellow card) 20', (goal) 31'; Cutajar (yellow card) 90+1'; Bojovic 90+2'; Darmanin (yellow card) 90+2'	Stadium: Victor Tedesco Stadium
