= 2018–19 Maltese Second Division =

Maltese Second Division
- Season: 2018–19
- Dates: 5 September 2018 – 20 April 2019
- Champions: St. George's
- Promoted: St. George's; Fgura United
- Relegated: St. Venera Lightnings; Siggiewi
- Matches: 156
- Goals: 2.61 (0.02 per match)
- Top goalscorer: Lazar Doric (15 goals)
- Biggest home win: Mġarr United 5-0 Siggiewi (6 April 2019)
- Biggest away win: Mġarr United 0-6 Rabat Ajax (8 October 2018)
- Highest scoring: Fgura United 6-2 Kalkara (30 March 2019)
- All statistics correct as of 27 April 2019.

The 2018–19 Maltese Second Division (known as the BOV Second Division for sponsorship reasons) is the league competition for the third-tier league in the Maltese football league system. The opening fixture was played on 5 September 2018 and the league season ended on 20 April 2019. St. George's won the championship after winning the decider against fellow promoted team, Fgura United. At the other side of the table, St. Venera Lightnings and Siggiewi were relegated.

== Overview ==
The number of teams will remain unchanged from the previous season and therefore the league will be contested by 13 teams, including 3 teams relegated from the 2017–18 Maltese First Division season and 2 teams promoted from the 2017–18 Maltese Third Division season. The 13 teams will play a round-robin tournament whereby each team plays each one of the other teams twice, once at 'home' and once 'away'. Thus, a total of 156 matches will be played, with 24 matches played by each team.

The top two teams will be promoted to the 2019–20 Maltese First Division, while the bottom two are relegated to the 2019–20 Maltese Third Division. The team which will place in the third position will get a second chance for promotion to the 2019–20 Maltese First Division by facing the third-last team of the 2018–19 Maltese First Division; while the team which ends in the ante-penultimate position participates in a similar play-off against the third placed team of the 2018–19 Maltese Third Division.

As is the norm in Malta, the matches will be played at a number of venues designated by the Malta Football Association. 4 different venues were assigned for this year's competition, with the Centenary Stadium in Ta' Qali hosting the largest share of matches. In a bid of drawing more supporters to the stadiums, admission prices for the season were slashed to €2, with those for children aged under 12 years and senior citizens abolished completely.

== Teams ==
Locations of the 2018–19 Maltese Second Division teams and venues

Team	In league since	Location	Last season
Birżebbuġa St. Peter's	2015–16	Birżebbuġa	7th
Fgura United	2017–18	Fgura	4th
Kalkara	2017–18	Kalkara	8th
Luqa St. Andrew's	2017–18	Luqa	10th
Marsaxlokk	2016–17	Marsaxlokk	6th
Melita	2018–19	St Julian's	First Division, 13th
Mellieħa	2018–19	Mellieħa	Third Division, 2nd
Mġarr United	2015–16	Mġarr	9th
Rabat Ajax	2018–19	Rabat	First Division, 14th
Siġġiewi	2011–12	Siġġiewi	5th
St. George's	2016–17	Cospicua	11th
St. Venera Lightnings	2018–19	Santa Venera	Third Division, 1st
St. Patrick	2018–19	Żabbar	First Division, 12th

== Venues ==
Stadium	Location	Capacity
Centenary Stadium	Ta' Qali	3,000
Luxol Stadium	Pembroke	800
Sirens Stadium	St. Paul's Bay	600
Victor Tedesco Stadium	Ħamrun	1,962

== League table ==
Pos	Team	Pld	W	D	L	GF	GA	GD	Pts	Qualification or relegation
1	St. George's (C)	24	16	5	3	40	16	+24	53	Promotion the Maltese First Division
2	Fgura United (P)	24	17	2	5	44	18	+26	53	Promotion the Maltese First Division
3	Mġarr United	24	15	6	3	45	22	+23	51	Qualification for the promotion play-offs
4	Marsaxlokk	24	14	5	5	40	23	+17	47	
5	Birzebbuga St. Peter's	24	13	4	7	40	26	+14	43	
6	Melita	24	11	6	7	40	27	+13	39	
7	Rabat Ajax	24	11	4	9	37	26	+11	37	
8	Kalkara	24	6	5	13	30	46	−16	23	
9	Mellieha	24	5	7	12	21	36	−15	22	
10	Luqa St. Andrew's	24	5	6	13	23	48	−25	21	
11	Żabbar St. Patrick (O)	24	6	2	16	16	31	−15	20	Qualification for the relegation play-offs
12	St. Venera Lightnings (R)	24	4	4	16	17	47	−30	16	Relegation to the Maltese Third Division
13	Siggiewi (R)	24	3	4	17	14	41	−27	13	Relegation to the Maltese Third Division

Updated to match(es) played on 27 April 2019. Source: Malta Football Association
Rules for classification: 1) Points; 2) Head-to-head points; 3) Head-to-head goals scored; 4) Goal difference; 5) Goals scored.
(C) Champions; (O) Play-off winners; (P) Promoted; (R) Relegated

== Results ==
Home \ Away	BSP	FGU	KAL	LSA	MAR	MLT	MEL	MGU	RAA	SIG	STG	SVL	ZSP
Birzebbuga St. Peter's	—	0–2	2–1	3–0	3–1	0–0	2–0	0–1	3–2	4–0	2–2	1–1	0–1
Fgura United	3–2	—	6–2	2–1	0–1	2–0	0–0	0–1	1–0	3–1	0–1	1–0	1–0
Kalkara	0–1	1–2	—	2–1	3–3	3–3	0–0	1–2	3–0	3–3	0–2	1–0	2–0
Luqa St. Andrew's	2–4	2–5	1–3	—	1–1	0–1	1–1	2–0	2–1	0–2	0–2	2–1	0–0
Marsaxlokk	1–1	2–1	2–0	4–0	—	2–0	3–2	0–1	0–2	2–0	0–1	3–2	3–0
Melita	0–1	1–3	3–1	2–2	1–3	—	5–1	1–2	3–0	3–1	1–0	3–1	2–0
Mellieha	2–1	0–2	1–2	2–3	0–2	1–2	—	0–4	0–1	0–0	0–1	1–1	0–0
Mġarr United	3–0	1–1	1–1	5–1	3–1	1–1	1–1	—	0–6	5–0	0–0	5–1	2–1
Rabat Ajax	1–3	0–1	3–0	3–0	1–1	1–0	3–0	2–2	—	1–0	1–3	2–0	0–1
Siggiewi	0–1	0–2	1–0	0–0	0–1	0–0	1–3	0–1	0–3	—	0–2	0–1	1–2
St. George's	2–0	2–0	5–1	4–0	0–0	2–2	1–2	1–0	1–1	2–1	—	1–3	2–1
St. Venera Lightnings	1–5	0–4	2–0	0–0	1–3	0–3	0–3	0–2	0–0	1–3	0–1	—	1–0
Żabbar St. Patrick	0–1	0–2	2–0	0–2	0–1	0–3	0–1	1–2	2–3	1–0	1–2	3–0	—

Updated to match(es) played on 27 April 2019. Source: Malta Football Association
Legend: Blue = home team win; Yellow = draw; Red = away team win.
For upcoming matches, an "a" indicates there is an article about the rivalry between the two participants.

== Playoffs ==
=== Championship play-off ===
St. George's and Fgura United finished the regular season level on points and therefore a play-off was required to decide the winner of the 2018-19 Maltese Second Division.

26 April 2019	St. George's	2 - 1	Fgura United	Ta' Qali
CEST	Mentosa 12'; Cassar 76'	Report	Gilbert 18'	Stadium: Centenary Stadium; Referee: Malcolm Spiteri

=== Promotion play-off ===
A play-off match took place between the twelfth-placed team from the First Division (Vittoriosa Stars), and the third-placed team from the Second Division (Mgarr United), for a place in the 2019–20 Maltese First Division.

5 May 2019	Vittoriosa Stars (2)	v	Mgarr United (3)

=== Relegation play-off ===
A play-off match took place between the twelfth-placed team from the Second Division, (Żabbar St. Patrick), and the third-placed team from the Third Division, (Msida Saint-Joseph), for a place in the 2019–20 Maltese Second Division.

28 April 2019	Żabbar St. Patrick (3)	2 - 0	Msida Saint-Joseph (4)	Pembroke
	Agius 75' 87'	Report		Stadium: Luxol Stadium; Referee: Andrea Sciriha

== Top goalscorers ==
Rank	Player	Club	Goals
1	(Serbia) Lazar Doric	Mgarr United	17
2	(Malta) Giovanni Galea	Fgura United	15
3	(Malta) Thomas Timmy	Marsaxlokk	14

Last updated: 27 April 2019
