= 2026–27 Maltese Challenge League =

Maltese Challenge League
- Season: 2026–27
- Dates: 11 September 2026 – April 2027
- All statistics correct as of 11 September 2026.

The 2026–27 Maltese Challenge League (referred to as the BOV Challenge League for sponsorship reasons) is the second-level league football in Malta. It is the seventh season that the competition has been running in its present form.

== Teams ==
The league consists of sixteen teams; twelve teams remaining from the previous season, two teams promoted from the 2025-26 Maltese National Amateur League, and two teams relegated from the 2025-26 Maltese Premier League.

=== Team changes ===
The following teams have changed divisions since the 2025–26 season:

==== To Maltese Challenge League ====
Promoted from Maltese National Amateur League

- Attard ▲
- Victoria Hotspurs ▲

Relegated from the Maltese Premier League

- Naxxar Lions ▼
- Tarxien Rainbows ▼

==== From Maltese Challenge League ====
Promoted to the Maltese Premier League

- Balzan ▲
- Birzebbuga St. Peter's ▲

Relegated to Maltese National Amateur League

- Marsa ▼
- Mtarfa ▼

Location of teams in 2025–26 Maltese Challenge League

Team	Location	Manager
Attard	Attard	(Malta) Daniel Agius
Fgura United	Fgura	(Malta) Kevin Vella
Gudja United	Gudja	(Nigeria) Orosco Anonam
Melita	San Ġiljan	(Malta) Brian Said
Mgarr United	Mgarr	(Italy) Andrea Agostinelli
Naxxar Lions	Naxxar	(Argentina) Pablo Doffo
Pietà Hotspurs	Pietà	(Malta) Kevin Vella
Santa Lucia	Santa Luċija	(Malta) Joseph Galea
Sirens	St. Paul's Bay	(Malta) Stephen Damato
St. Andrews	St. Andrew's, Malta	(Serbia) Marko Rajic
Swieqi United	Swieqi	(Malta) Liam Mangion
Tarxien Rainbows	Tarxien	(Malta) Manuel Caruana
(Gozo) Victoria Hotspurs	Victoria	(Malta) Oliver Spiteri
Vittoriosa Stars	Birgu	(Malta) Jason Camenzuli
Żebbuġ Rangers	Żebbuġ	(Malta) Saviour Debono Grech
Żurrieq	Żurrieq	(Malta) Brian Spiteri

== Venues ==
Ta' Qali	Ta' Qali	Location of host stadia during the 2025-26 Maltese Challenge League
Ta' Qali National Stadium	Centenary Stadium	Location of host stadia during the 2025-26 Maltese Challenge League
Capacity: 16,997	Capacity: 3,000	Location of host stadia during the 2025-26 Maltese Challenge League
St. Paul's Bay	Hamrun	Location of host stadia during the 2025-26 Maltese Challenge League
Sirens Stadium	Victor Tedesco Stadium	Location of host stadia during the 2025-26 Maltese Challenge League
Capacity: 1,024	Capacity: 1,962	Location of host stadia during the 2025-26 Maltese Challenge League

== Regular season ==
During the regular season, each team plays each other once (either at home or at away). The top eight teams qualify for the Top eight, while the bottom eight teams qualify for the Play-Out.

=== League table ===
Pos	Team	Pld	W	D	L	GF	GA	GD	Pts	Qualification
1	Tarxien Rainbows	7	6	1	0	18	9	+9	19	Qualification for the Top Eight
2	Swieqi United	7	5	1	1	15	10	+5	16	Qualification for the Top Eight
3	Naxxar Lions	7	5	1	1	13	8	+5	16	Qualification for the Top Eight
4	Fgura United	7	4	3	0	13	4	+9	15	Qualification for the Top Eight
5	Melita	7	4	1	2	10	5	+5	13	Qualification for the Top Eight
6	Pietà Hotspurs	7	4	0	3	13	11	+2	12	Qualification for the Top Eight
7	Mgarr United	7	3	1	3	9	8	+1	10	Qualification for the Top Eight
8	Żurrieq	7	3	1	3	7	7	0	10	Qualification for the Top Eight
9	Sirens	7	2	1	4	10	14	−4	7	Qualification for the Play-Out
10	Żebbuġ Rangers	7	2	1	4	6	12	−6	7	Qualification for the Play-Out
11	St. Andrews	7	2	1	4	3	10	−7	7	Qualification for the Play-Out
12	Attard	7	1	3	3	9	10	−1	6	Qualification for the Play-Out
13	Santa Lucia	7	0	6	1	6	8	−2	6	Qualification for the Play-Out
14	Victoria Hotspurs	7	2	0	5	7	10	−3	6	Qualification for the Play-Out
15	Vittoriosa Stars	7	1	3	3	7	10	−3	6	Qualification for the Play-Out
16	Gudja United	7	0	0	7	3	13	−10	0	Qualification for the Play-Out

Updated to match(es) played on 08 November 2026. Source: Malta Football Association
Rules for classification: 1) Points; 2) Play-offs (only if needed to decide champions or teams for relegation).

=== Results ===
Home \ Away	ATT	FGU	GUD	MEL	MGR	NXR	PIE	STL	SIR	STA	SWQ	TXN	VHS	VIT	ZEB	ZUR
Attard	—															
Fgura United		—														
Gudja United			—													
Melita				—												
Mgarr United					—											
Naxxar Lions						—										
Pietà Hotspurs							—									
Santa Lucia								—								
Sirens									—							
St. Andrews										—						
Swieqi United											—					
Tarxien Rainbows												—				
Victoria Hotspurs													—			
Vittoriosa Stars														—		
Żebbuġ Rangers															—	
Żurrieq																—

Updated to match(es) played on 11 September 2026. Source:
Legend: Blue = home team win; Yellow = draw; Red = away team win.
For upcoming matches, an "a" indicates there is an article about the rivalry between the two participants.
