= Martin Scicluna =

Martin Scicluna may refer to:

- Martin Scicluna (footballer) (born 1960), Maltese footballer
- Martin Scicluna (businessman), British businessman
