= National Amateur Super Cup (Malta) =

Defunct football cup in Malta

- Organiser(s): Malta Football Association
- Founded: 2021; 5 years ago
- Abolished: 2025; 1 year ago
- Region: Malta
- Teams: 2
- Last champions: Birżebbuġa St. Peter's (1st title)
- Most championships: Various (1 title)
- Website: matchcentre.mfa.com.mt/competition/2603031/Official

The National Amateur Super Cup was an annual super cup football competition that took place in Malta between the winners of the National Amateur League I, the third and top level of Malta amateur league football, and the winners of National Amateur Cup.

== Overview ==
The match was usually held immediately following the conclusion of the National Amateur League I and the National Amateur Cup. Had the same club won both the National Amateur League I and the National Amateur Cup, then the National Amateur Super Cup would have been contested between the said winner and the runner-up of the National Amateur League I.

The inaugural super cup was originally scheduled to be held at the end of the 2020–21 season. However, following the Malta Football Association's decision to terminate all football domestic competitions due to the nationwide ban on organised sports events as announced by the Government and the Public Health Authorities due to the onset of COVID-19, this was not ultimately held.

The first held edition was eventually held in 2022 and it was won by Żabbar St. Patrick. The current holders are Birżebbuġa St. Peter's, with Senglea Athletic and Mtarfa winning the previous editions.

So far, all finals were held at the Centenary Stadium. In 2025 Victoria Hotspurs became the first and the only club from Gozo to ever contest the Amateur National Super Cup.

The cup was discontinued as from the 2025/26 season.

== Results ==
Season	Winners	Score	Runners–up	Venue	Report
2021	Not held due to Covid				
2022	Żabbar St. Patrick	4–4 (a.e.t); 4–2 (pen.)	Żurrieq	Centenary Stadium	
2023	Senglea Athletic	1–0	Żabbar St. Patrick	Centenary Stadium	
2024	Mtarfa	4–4 (a.e.t); 5–4 (pen.)	Mġarr United	Centenary Stadium	
2025	Birżebbuġa St. Peter's	1–0 (a.e.t)	Victoria Hotspurs (Gozo)	Centenary Stadium	

== Results by club ==
Club	Wins	Last final won	Runners-up	Last final lost	Total appearances
Birżebbuġa St. Peter's	1	2025	0	—	1
Żabbar St. Patrick	1	2022	1	2023	2
Senglea Athletic	1	2023	0	—	1
Mtarfa	1	2024	0	—	1
Żurrieq	0	—	1	2022	1
Mġarr United	0	—	1	2024	1
Victoria Hotspurs (Gozo)	0	—	1	2025	1
