= Scicluna =

Scicluna or Xicluna (pr: Shi-KLOO-nah) is a surname of Maltese origin, related to Sicilian surnames Scicolone and Scichiloni. People with this surname include:

== People ==
- Adam Scicluna, Australian entertainer
- Carla Scicluna (born 2001), Maltese sprinter
- Carmelo Scicluna (1800–1888), Maltese prelate and count
- Charles J. Scicluna (born 1959), Roman Catholic prelate
- Dylan Scicluna (born 2004), Australian footballer
- Edward Scicluna (born 1946), Maltese politician and a Member of the European Parliament
- Grant Scicluna (born 1980), Australian film director and writer
- Kenneth Scicluna (born 1979), Maltese footballer
- Martin Scicluna (businessman) (born 1950/51), British businessman
- Martin Scicluna (footballer) (born 1960), Maltese footballer
- Mikel Scicluna (1929–2010), Maltese wrestler
- Ryan Scicluna (born 1993), Maltese footballer
- Tino Scicluna, American soccer player

== See also ==
- Palazzo Parisio (Naxxar), Palazzo Parisio in Naxxar, Malta
