= 2022–23 Maltese Futsal Knockout Cup =

2022–23 Maltese futsal competition

Tournament details
- Host country: Malta
- Dates: 25 January 2023 - 5 May 2023
- Teams: 10

Final positions
- Champions: UM Futsal Academy
- Runners-up: Luxol St Andrews

2021–22 Maltese Futsal Knockout Cup was a futsal competition in Malta, organized in a single-elimination format. Twenty teams entered the tournament, which began on 25 January 2023 and concluded with the final on 9 May 2023. UM Futsal Academy claimed the title after a 3–2 victory over Luxol St Andrews in the final.

== Preliminary Round ==
Team 1	Score	Team 2
Fgura United	2–6	Malta FA Under 19 Futsal
St George's Bormla	4–3	Marsaskala Legends

== Quarter-Finals ==
Team 1	Score	Team 2
St George's Bormla	0–6	UM Futsal Academy
Luxol St Andrews	6–1	Swieqi United
Malta FA Under 19 Futsal	3–13	Ta' Xbiex Izola Bank
Veterans Malta Futsal	1–8	Zurrieq

== Semi-Finals ==
Team 1	Score	Team 2
Ta' Xbiex Izola Bank	2–7	UM Futsal Academy
Luxol St Andrews	4–3	Zurrieq

== Final ==
Team 1	Score	Team 2
Luxol St Andrews	2–3	UM Futsal Academy

== External sources ==
- FutsalPlanet – Competitions overview
