= 2024–25 Maltese Futsal Knockout Cup =

2024–25 Maltese futsal competition

Tournament details
- Host country: Malta
- Dates: 26 January 2025 - 01 July 2025
- Teams: 8

Final positions
- Champions: University of Malta Futsal
- Runners-up: Luxol

Tournament statistics
- Matches played: 7

2024–25 Maltese Futsal Knockout Cup, also known as the 2024–25 Laferla Futsal Trophy for sponsorship reasons, was a futsal competition in Malta, organized in a single-elimination format. Twenty teams entered the tournament, which began on 7 September 2024 and concluded with the final on 26 June 2025. University of Malta Futsal claimed the title after a 2–1 victory over Luxol in the final. Previously, they convincingly won their semi-finals, against Marsaskala Legends and Ta' Xbiex.

== Quarter-Finals ==
Team 1	Score	Team 2
Ħamrun SC NCMB	2–4	Luxol St Andrews
University of Malta	6–4	Gżr Birżebbuġa St Peter's
Ta' Xbiex	5–3	Swieqi United LEC07
Malta U17	0–8	Marsaskala Legends

== Semi-Finals ==
Team 1	Score	Team 2
Ta' Xbiex	2–6	Luxol St Andrews
University of Malta	8–0	Marsaskala Legends

== Final ==
Team 1	Score	Team 2
University of Malta	2–1	Luxol St Andrews

== External sources ==
- FutsalPlanet – Competitions overview
