= National Cup (Malta) =

Football cup in Malta

- Founded: 2021; 5 years ago (As National Amateur Cup)
- Region: Malta (including Gozo)
- Teams: 31
- Qualifier for: Maltese FA Trophy
- Current champions: Qormi (1st title)
- Most championships: Żabbar St. Patrick (2 titles)
- Website: Home
- 2026–27 National Cup

The National Cup (referred to as the BOV National Cup for sponsorship reasons) is an annual knockout football competition that takes place in Malta.

The tournament is open to all the teams that take part in the National League I and National League II, the last two levels of Maltese football, and five teams from the Gozo Football League Second Division.

The teams that reach the semi-final stage are allowed to take part in the Maltese FA Trophy preliminary round and the winner makes it to the National Amateur Super Cup.

== Format ==
The tournament was created in 2020, following a general restructuring of the Maltese football system by the Malta Football Association. It was decided to create a new single-elimination competition reserved for the teams from the lower categories.

The first season of the cup started in October 2020 and it was interrupted and later declared cancelled on 9 April 2021 due to the decision of the MFA to stop all the competitions because of COVID-19 pandemic in Malta. Munxar Falcons and Żebbuġ Rovers were the first two Gozitan teams that played in the competition. The first actual winner of the competition was Żabbar St. Patrick, that won the cup in 2022. Zebbug Rovers were the first Gozitan team to pass through a round, when on the 8th of August 2022 they've beaten Pembroke Athleta F.C with a 6–2 scoreline, hence they were also the first Gozitan club that had beaten Maltese opposition in this competition. They made it to the round of last 16.

== Winners and finalists ==
Season	Winners	Score	Runners–up	Venue	Report
2020–21	Żurrieq	-^	Msida Saint-Joseph	Hibernians Stadium	
2021–22	Żabbar St. Patrick	6–2	Marsaskala	Centenary Stadium	
2022–23	Żabbar St. Patrick	2–0	Mġarr United	Victor Tedesco Stadium	
2023–24	Mġarr United	3–2	Kirkop United	Centenary Stadium	
2024–25	Victoria Hotspurs (Gozo)	2–1	Qrendi	Centenary Stadium	
2025–26	Qormi	4–0	Victoria Hotspurs (Gozo)	Centenary Stadium	

^ Not held due to the COVID-19 pandemic

== Results by club ==
Club	Wins	Last final won	Runners-up	Last final lost	Total appearances
Żabbar St. Patrick	2	2023–23	0	—	2
Mġarr United	1	2023–24	1	2023–23	2
Victoria Hotspurs (Gozo)	1	2024–25	1	2025-26	2
Qormi	1	2025–26	0	—	1
Marsaskala	0	—	1	2021–22	1
Kirkop United	0	—	1	2023–24	1
Qrendi	0	—	1	2024–25	1
