= 2024–25 Maltese National Amateur League II =

Maltese National Amateur League II
- Season: 2024–25
- Dates: 15 September 2024 – 5 April 2025
- Champions: Victoria Hotspurs
- Promoted: Mqabba F.C.
- Matches: 96
- Goals: 315 (3.28 per match)
- Top goalscorer: Timothy John Thomas (19 Goals)
- Biggest home win: Kalkara 6–0 Santa Venera Lightnings (24 January 2025)
- Biggest away win: Santa Venera Lightnings 0–7 Victoria Hotspurs (4 January 2025)
- Highest scoring: Santa Venera Lightnings 3–6 St. George's (22 December 2024)
- Longest winning run: Victoria Hotspurs (18 Games)
- Longest unbeaten run: Victoria Hotspurs (All season)
- Longest winless run: Santa Venera Lightnings (All season)
- Longest losing run: Santa Venera Lightnings (12 Games)
- All statistics correct as of 13 May 2025.

The 2024–25 Maltese National Amateur League II (referred to, for sponsorship reasons, as the IZIBet National Amateur League) occurred between August 2024 and April 2025. This was the first season since the fourth division returned after four years with three levels of the Football Division League system. The Maltese National Amateur League 2 is Malta's fourth-highest professional football division. In the end, Victoria Hotspurs won the inaugural season and got promoted to the Maltese National Amateur League.

On 30 April 2024 Victoria Hotspurs from Gozo became a new member of Malta Football Association. They became Gozo's first football club to play in the Maltese Football League.

== Teams ==
Ten teams competed in the 2024-25 League.

Location of clubs that played in the 2024-25 League

Team	Location	Manager
Dingli Swallows	Dingli	(Malta) Nicolai Caruana
Ghaxaq	Ghaxaq	(Malta) Conrad Debattista
Kalkara United	Kalkara	(Brazil) Bruno Menezes Pinheiro
Mdina Knights	Mdina	(Romania) Constantin Cristinel Cretu
Mqabba	Mqabba	(Malta) Joseph Attard
Santa Venera Lightnings	Santa Venera	(Malta) Carmelo Camilleri
Siggiewi	Siggiewi	(Malta) Simon Agius
St. George's	Cospicua	(Malta) Edmond Lufi
Ta' Xbiex	Ta' Xbiex	(Malta) Marc Psaila Soler
Victoria Hotspurs	Victoria	(Malta) Oliver Spiteri

== Venues ==
2024–25 Maltese National Amateur League II is located in Malta
Pembroke	Mosta
Luxol Stadium	Charles Abela Stadium
Capacity: 600	Capacity: 700
San Pawl il-Baħar	Ta' Qali
Sirens Stadium	Centenary Stadium
Capacity: 800	Capacity: 3,000

== Table ==
=== Regular season ===
Pos	Team	Pld	W	D	L	GF	GA	GD	Pts	Qualification
1	Victoria Hotspurs	18	18	0	0	64	7	+57	54	Qualification for the Top Four
2	Mqabba	18	12	3	3	47	22	+25	39	Qualification for the Top Four
3	St. George's	18	11	3	4	34	19	+15	36	Qualification for the Top Four
4	Kalkara United	18	11	2	5	36	14	+22	35	Qualification for the Top Four
5	Dingli Swallows	18	8	3	7	29	33	−4	27	
6	Siggiewi	18	6	4	8	16	25	−9	22	
7	Ghaxaq	18	6	2	10	30	38	−8	20	
8	Mdina Knights	18	6	1	11	18	28	−10	19	
9	Ta' Xbiex	18	2	1	15	13	46	−33	7	
10	Santa Venera Lightning	18	0	1	17	11	66	−55	1	

Updated to match(es) played on 12 May 2025. Source:
Rules for classification: 1) Points; 2) Play-offs (only if needed to decide champions, relegation, or teams for relegation play-offs).

=== Results ===
Home \ Away	DIN	GHX	KLK	MDI	MQA	SVL	SIG	STG	XBX	VCT
Dingli Swallows	—	2–3	0–2	1–0	0–3	5–1	2–1	2–4	2–0	0–3
Ghaxaq	1–2	—	1–0	0–1	2–4	4–0	0–0	2–2	4–3	0–4
Kalkara United	1–2	4–3	—	2–0	1–1	6–0	2–0	0–0	3–1	0–2
Mdina Knights	0–3 (Note: Dingli Swallows were awarded a 3–0 win after the Malta Football Association's Protests Board upheld their protest. Originally, the match ended in a 1–1.)	2–0	0–4	—	1–2	2–0	0–0	1–2	2–1	0–1
Mqabba	2–2	5–3	2–0	2–0	—	4–1	3–0	1–1	3–0	2–4
Santa Venera Lightning	1–3	0–4	0–3	0–4	0–3	—	1–1	3–6	1–2	0–7
Siggiewi	2–2	2–0	0–3	3–1	0–4	3–1	—	2–0	1–0	0–2
St. George's	3–0	2–0	0–1	1–0	3–1	5–1	2–0	—	2–0	0–3 (Note: Victoria Hotspurs were awarded a 3–0 win after the Malta Football Association's Protests Board upheld their protest. Originally, St. George's won the game 2–0.)
Ta' Xbiex	1–1	0–3	0–3	2–3	0–4	2–0	0–1	0–1	—	0–6
Victoria Hotspurs	5–0	5–0	2–1	4–1	4–1	2–1	2–0	2–0	6–1	—

Updated to match(es) played on 31 May 2025. Source:
Legend: Blue = home team win; Yellow = draw; Red = away team win.

=== Top Four ===
Pos	Team	Pld	W	D	L	GF	GA	GD	Pts	Qualification
1	Victoria Hotspurs	21	20	1	0	72	8	+64	61	Promotion to the Maltese National Amateur League I
2	Mqabba	21	13	4	4	50	26	+24	43	Promotion to the Maltese National Amateur League I
3	St. George's	21	12	3	6	37	27	+10	39	
4	Kalkara United	21	11	4	6	39	18	+21	37	

Updated to match(es) played on 12 May 2025. Source:
Rules for classification: 1) Points; 2) Play-offs (only if needed to decide champions, relegation, or teams for relegation play-offs).

=== Results ===
Home \ Away	KLK	MQA	STG	VCT
Kalkara United	—	0–0	–	–
Mqabba	–	—	3–0	–
St. George's	3–2	–	—	0–3
Victoria Hotspurs	1–1	4–0	–	—

Updated to match(es) played on 31 May 2025. Source:
Legend: Blue = home team win; Yellow = draw; Red = away team win.

=== Top scorers ===
As of 13 May 2025

Rank	Player	Club	Goals
1	(Malta) Timothy John Thomas	Kalkara/Mqabba	19
2	(Colombia) Andres Tenorio Viveros	Mqabba	17
2	(Brazil) Rondinely Roberto Monteiro	Victoria Hotspurs	17
4	(Malta) Aaron Agius	Ghaxaq	16
5	(Malta) Kurt Borg	Victoria Hotspurs	12

==== Hat-tricks ====
Player	For	Against	Result	Stadium	Date
(Malta) Aaron Agius	Ghaxaq	Ta' Xbiex	3–0 (A)	Luxol Stadium, Pembroke	19 October 2024
(Brazil) Rondinely Roberto Monteiro	Victoria Hotspurs	Dingli Swallows	5–0 (H)	Sirens Stadium, St. Paul's Bay	27 October 2024
(Malta) Kurt Borg ^{4}	Victoria Hotspurs	Ta' Xbiex	6–0 (A)	Sirens Stadium, St. Paul's Bay	9 November 2024

Notes

^{4} Player scored 4 goalss

=== Clean sheets ===
As of 31 May 2025

Rank	Player	Club	Clean sheets
1	(Malta) Liam Lagana	Kalkara United	11
2	(Malta) Mario Bartolo	Mqabba	10
2	(Malta) Adrian Parnis	Victoria Hotspurs	10
4	(Malta) Clive Caruana	St. George's	7
5	(Malta) Leon Seisun	Siggiewi	6

=== Discipline ===
==== Player ====
- Most yellow cards: 4
  - (Malta) Gaynor D'Amato (Ghaxaq)
- Most red cards: 1
  - (Malta) Kane William Micallef (Mdina Knights)
  - (Malta) Raphael Said (Santa Venera Lightning)
  - (Malta) Gianluca Borg (St. George's)
  - (Malta) Jake Schiavone (St. George's)
  - (Malta) Nicky Vella (Ta' Xbiex)

==== Club ====
- Most yellow cards: 16
  - Għaxaq
- Most red cards: 2
  - St. George's
