= 2024–25 Maltese Futsal League =

Maltese Futsal League
- Season: 2024–25
- Country: Malta
- Champions: Luxol St Andrews
- Relegated: none
- 2025-26 UEFA Champions League: Luxol St Andrews
- Luxol

The 2024–25 Maltese Futsal League, also known as Enemed Futsal League is the 26th season of the futsal championship in Malta, since the beginning of organized futsal in the country in 1999.

== Format ==
The 2024–25 Maltese Futsal League was contested in two stages. In the first phase, the league consisted of nine participants, each playing one another once in a single round-robin format.

Following this stage, the top five clubs advanced to the Premier League, where they again played a single round-robin (four matches each). The top five teams then entered the play-offs to determine the champions of the 2024–25 season.

The bottom four clubs from the first phase competed in the Challenger League. The winner of FMA Futsal Challenger Cup for this season is Ħamrun Futsal NCMB when they beat 2-1 Marsaskala Legends in the final.

== First stage ==
After 8 rounds, Luxol, the previous season's champions secured the top position to qualify for the Premier stage.

Pos	Team	Pts
1	Luxol St Andrew's	24
2	Ta’ Xbiex	18
3	Swieqi United LEC07	16
4	University of Malta	15
5	Marsaskala Legends	13
6	Ħamrun SC NCMB	12
7	Malta U19	6
8	Gżr Birżebbuġa St Peter's	3
9	Malta U17	0

== Premier League ==
Elite Round Standings
Pos	Team	Pts	Pld	W	D	L	GF	GA	GD	Qualification
1	Luxol St Andrew's	34	12	11	1	0	112	27	+85	Playoffs
2	Swieqi United LEC07	24	12	7	3	2	71	34	+37	Playoffs
3	Ta’ Xbiex	22	12	7	1	4	57	50	+7	Playoffs
4	University of Malta	21	12	7	0	5	58	41	+17	Playoffs
5	Marsaskala Legends	13	12	4	1	7	56	66	−10	Challenger Cup

=== Legend ===
- Blue cell – Qualified for Playoffs
- Light blue cell – Assigned to Challenger Cup (relegation/play-off)

== Championship playoff ==
=== Final ===
Team 1	Score	Team 2
Luxol	8–6	Swieqi United LEC07
Luxol	4–2	Swieqi United LEC07

== Awards ==
=== Coaches ===
Premier League Coach of the Year: Zvezdan Vuković (Luxol St Andrew's)

Challenger League Coach of the Year: Kieran Bugeja

=== Players ===
Premier League Best Maltese Player: Giancarlo Sammut (Ta’ Xbiex)

Challenger League Best Maltese Player: Collin Sammut (Ħamrun Futsal NCMB)

Most Promising Futsal Player: Collin Sammut (Ħamrun Futsal NCMB)

Premier League Top Scorer: Ezequiel Alarcón (Swieqi United LEC07, 24 goals)

Challenger League Top Scorer: Hamza Harrat (Ħamrun Futsal NCMB, 14 goals)

Premier League Best Goalkeeper: Clint Mifsud (Luxol St Andrew's)

Challenger League Best Goalkeeper: Matthias Borg (Ħamrun Futsal NCMB)

Premier League Best Foreign Players: Jefferson Breno (Luxol St Andrew's)

Challenger League Best Foreign Players: Gia Nikvashvili (Ħamrun Futsal NCMB)

President's Special Award: Mark Zammit (Luxol St Andrew's, captain of the Malta national futsal team)
