= Scicolone =

Scicolone is a surname of Italian origin, from the southern coast of Sicily, likely related to the town of Scicli. Notable people with the surname include:

- Maria Villani Scicolone (born 1938), Italian television personality, columnist, and singer
- Sofia Villani Scicolone (born 1934), Italian actress known as Sophia Loren

See also: Scicluna, related Maltese surname.
