= Karl Micallef =

Maltese footballer

Personal information
- Full name: Karl Micallef
- Date of birth: 8 September 1996 (age 30)
- Place of birth: Malta
- Position: Centre-back

Team information
- Current team: Marsaxlokk
- Number: 4

Senior career*
Years	Team	Apps	(Gls)
2013–2017	Pietà Hotspurs	17	(0)
2017–2022	Ħamrun Spartans	118	(2)
2022–2023	Gudja United	32	(1)
2024–2025	Marsaxlokk	41	(1)
2025–	Victoria Hotspurs		

International career^{‡}
2012	Malta U17	3	(0)
2013–2014	Malta U19	6	(0)
2017–2018	Malta U21	10	(0)
2019–	Malta	8	(0)
- * Club domestic league appearances and goals as of 26 June 2025 ‡ National team caps and goals as of 25 June 2023

Karl Micallef (born 8 September 1996) is a Maltese footballer who plays as a centre-back for Victoria Hotspurs and the Malta national team.

== Career ==
Micallef made his international debut for Malta on 26 March 2019, coming on as a substitute for Jonathan Caruana in the 85th minute of the UEFA Euro 2020 qualifying home match against Spain, which finished as a 0–2 loss.

He joined Victoria Hotspurs in July 2025.

== Career statistics ==
=== International ===
As of 26 March 2019

Malta
Year	Apps	Goals
2019	1	0
Total	1	0
