= Jurgen Pisani =

Maltese footballer

Personal information
- Full name: Jurgen Pisani
- Date of birth: 3 September 1992 (age 34)
- Place of birth: Malta
- Position: Defender

Senior career*
Years	Team	Apps	(Gls)
–2015	Pietà Hotspurs	32+	(4+)
2015–2021	Floriana	82	(2)
2021–2024	Santa Lucia	76	(5)
2024	Gżira United	10	(0)
2025–2026	Żabbar St. Patrick	35	(1)

International career^{‡}
2010	Malta U19	1	(0)
2013–2014	Malta U21	8	(0)
2019–	Malta	1	(0)
- * Club domestic league appearances and goals as of 21 June 2026 ‡ National team caps and goals as of 02:50, 16 November 2019 (UTC)

Jurgen Pisani (born 3 September 1992) is a Maltese former footballer who played as a defender.

== Career ==
Pisani made his international debut for Malta on 15 November 2019 in a UEFA Euro 2020 qualifying match against Spain, which finished as a 0–7 away loss.

== Career statistics ==
=== International ===
As of 15 November 2019

Malta
Year	Apps	Goals
2019	1	0
Total	1	0
