= Martin Scicluna (footballer) =

Maltese footballer

Personal information
- Full name: Martin Scicluna
- Date of birth: 28 November 1960 (age 65)
- Place of birth: Malta
- Position: Defender

Team information
- Current team: Valletta (Under 19 Coach)

Senior career*
Years	Team	Apps	(Gls)
1977–1984	Vittoriosa Stars		
1984–1985	Rabat Ajax		
1985–1991	Żurrieq		
1991–1992	Hibernians		
1992–1993	Victoria Hotspurs		

International career^{‡}
1984–1988	Malta	20	(0)

Managerial career
- 1996–1998: Tarxien Rainbows
- * Club domestic league appearances and goals as of 4 June 2011 ‡ National team caps and goals as of 4 June 2011

Martin Scicluna (born 28 November 1960 in Malta) was a professional footballer, during his career he played for Rabat Ajax and Żurrieq, where he played as a defender.

== International career ==
=== Malta ===
Scicluna played for the Malta national football team in the UEFA Euro 1988 qualifying rounds.

== Coaching career ==
On 3 June 2011, Martin Scicluna was named as the new under 19 coach for Valletta, replacing the outgoing Twanny Dalli.
