= National League II (Malta) =

Association football league in Malta

- Founded: 2024
- Country: Malta
- Number of clubs: 14 (2026-27)
- Level on pyramid: 4
- Promotion to: National League I
- Domestic cup: National Cup
- Current champions: Kalkara United (2025–26 Amateur League II)
- Website: Home
- Current: 2026–27 National League II

The National League II (referred to as the BOV National League II for sponsorship reasons) is the fourth-highest and lowest division in Maltese football. It was launched as from the 2024–25 season, following the split of the former Maltese National Amateur League into two levels.

== Format ==
- 10 clubs: 2024–2025
- 12 clubs: 2025–26
- 14 clubs: 2026–

Over the course of the season, each team will play each other twice for a total of 18 games. Three points are awarded for a win, one for a draw and zero for a loss. The teams are ranked in the table by total points gained. In the need of a tie-breaker, a play-off game is played.

In the 2024-25 season, for the first time ever in Maltese and Gozitan football - which operate two separate league systems, a club which used to play in the Gozo football league system will feature in the Maltese one. The club that made the historic switch was Victoria Hotspurs, which were admitted to the National Amateur League II. They became champions in their first season in the competition.

The league was rebranded into National League II as from the 2026–27 season.

== Venues ==
National League II (Malta) is located in Malta
Ta' Qali	San Pawl il-Baħar
Centenary Stadium	Sirens Stadium
Capacity: 3,000	Capacity: 800
Pembroke	Mosta
Luxol Stadium	Charles Abela Stadium
Capacity: 700	Capacity: 600

== Results ==
Year	Champions	Runner-up	Third place
2024–25	(Gozo) Victoria Hotspurs	Mqabba	St. George's
2025–26	Kalkara United	Dingli Swallows	Msida Saint-Joseph
