= Ta' Xbiex S.C. =

Maltese football club

Ta' Xbiex
- Full name: Ta' Xbiex Sports Club
- Founded: 5th May 2012; 14 years ago
- Ground: Various
- President: Juergen Friedrich Fischer
- Head Coach: Anderson Meyar De Melo
- League: National Amateur League II
- 2024–25: National Amateur League II, 9th
- Website: https://www.facebook.com/TaXbiexSportsClub
Home colours	Away colours

Ta' Xbiex Sports Club is a Maltese sports club that plays football in the National Amateur League II, from the central locality of Ta' Xbiex.

== 2012–13 Season ==
During the 2012–13 season, Ta’ Xbiex Sports Club competed in the Malta Football Association 3rd Division and the Maltese FA Trophy. The campaign proved challenging in league competition, with the club enduring a prolonged winless run, though performances improved slightly during the latter stages of the season. In cup competition, Ta’ Xbiex achieved progression from the preliminary round before elimination by higher-ranked opposition.

=== Season Overview ===
Ta’ Xbiex struggled for consistency throughout the league campaign, conceding a high number of goals against several promotion-challenging sides. Despite this, the team recorded notable victories during the second half of the season, including a comprehensive home win against Qrendi F.C. and a late-season home victory over Attard Football Club. An away win against Mtarfa F.C. in April marked the club's final league victory of the season.

In the FA Trophy, Ta’ Xbiex secured an opening-round victory over Munxar Falcons F.C. before exiting the competition following a heavy defeat away to Gudja United F.C..

=== League Results ===
Date	Opponent	Venue	Result	Ta’ Xbiex Scorers
16 Sep	Ghaxaq F.C.	Home	L 0–5	—
22 Sep	Marsaskala F.C.	Away	L 0–6	—
30 Sep	Sirens F.C.	Home	L 1–2	Ryan D'Amato
6 Oct	St. Lucia F.C.	Away	L 0–1	—
14 Oct	Marsa F.C.	Home	L 1–5	Adrian Dominicus
27 Oct	Senglea Athletic F.C.	Away	L 1–2	Murilo Rizzolo
4 Nov	Swieqi United F.C.	Away	L 0–1	—
10 Nov	Qrendi F.C.	Home	W 4–0	Murilo Rizzolo (2), Ryan D'Amato (2)
18 Nov	Luqa St. Andrew's F.C.	Away	W 4–1	Murilo Rizzolo (3), Adrian Dominicus
24 Nov	Kalkara F.C.	Home	L 2–3	Adrian Dominicus (2)
15 Dec	Mdina Knights F.C.	Away	L 0–1	—
22 Dec	Mtarfa F.C.	Home	L 0–1	—
6 Jan	Attard F.C.	Away	L 1–3	Nicholas Scicluna
12 Jan	Xgħajra Tornados F.C.	Home	L 0–4	—
27 Jan	Ghaxaq F.C.	Away	D 0–0	—
2 Feb	Marsaskala F.C.	Home	L 0–8	—
10 Feb	Sirens F.C.	Away	L 0–4	—
17 Feb	St. Lucia F.C.	Home	L 1–3	Nicholas Scicluna
23 Feb	Marsa F.C.	Away	L 0–2	—
3 Mar	Senglea Athletic F.C.	Home	L 0–6	—
17 Mar	Qrendi F.C.	Away	L 0–1	—
23 Mar	Luqa St. Andrew's F.C.	Home	L 1–3	Jethron Azzopardi
30 Mar	Kalkara F.C.	Away	L 0–1	—
10 Apr	Swieqi United F.C.	Home	L 0–1	—
13 Apr	Mdina Knights F.C.	Home	L 0–1	—
21 Apr	Mtarfa F.C.	Away	W 1–0	Christian Wismayer
27 Apr	Attard F.C.	Home	W 3–2	Adrian Dominicus (3)
5 May	Xgħajra Tornados F.C.	Away	L 0–1	—

=== FA Trophy ===
Date	Round	Opponent	Venue	Result	Ta’ Xbiex Scorers
9 Sep	Preliminary Round	Munxar Falcons F.C.	Home	W 2–1	Christian Wismayer, Jeffrey Azzopardi
20 Oct	First Round	Gudja United F.C.	Away	L 0–6	—

=== Summary ===
- League matches played: 28
- League wins: 4
- League draws: 1
- League losses: 23
- League goals scored: 19
- League goals conceded: 55
- FA Trophy matches played: 2
- FA Trophy wins: 1
- FA Trophy losses: 1

== Current Squad ==
Note: Flags indicate national team as defined under FIFA eligibility rules; some limited exceptions apply. Players may hold more than one non-FIFA nationality.

No.	Pos.	Nation	Player
4	DF	MLT	Neil Borg
5	DF	MLT	Jake Milwyn Davies
6	DF	MLT	Darren Darmanin
7	FW	MLT	Timothy John Thomas
8	MF	MLT	Nicholas Scicluna (Captain)
10	MF	MLT	Andrei Spiteri
11	MF	BRA	Vitor Hugo Alves Fernandes
14	DF	MLT	Aaron Meilak
15	DF	MLT	Warren Azzopardi (on loan from Senglea Athletic F.C.)
16	MF	MLT	Aaron Mizzi
17	DF	MLT	Sam Walker
18	MF	MLT	Simone Tindaro Crisafulli
19	FW	MLT	Luca Brincat

No.	Pos.	Nation	Player
20	MF	MLT	Nathan Belhadj
21	DF	MLT	Craig Jean Deguara (on loan from Marsaskala F.C.)
23	DF	MLT	Jordan Debattista
24	FW	MLT	Andrè Joe Cutajar (on loan from Mqabba F.C.)
26	MF	MLT	Matthew Buhagiar
28	MF	MLT	Antoine Attard
30	GK	MLT	Brandon Debono
33	MF	MLT	Kane William Micallef
45	FW	MLT	Mattias Formosa
52	DF	MLT	Nicky Vella
77	GK	MLT	Adam Benjelloun
80	MF	MLT	Kurt Zahra

=== Other Players Registered ===
Note: Flags indicate national team as defined under FIFA eligibility rules; some limited exceptions apply. Players may hold more than one non-FIFA nationality.

No.	Pos.	Nation	Player
—	GK	MLT	Nathan Joseph Cutajar
—	GK	MLT	Karl Balzan
—	GK	MLT	Matthew Schembri
—	DF	MLT	Jean Paul Abdilla
—	DF	MLT	Owen Agius
—	DF	MLT	Matthias Azzopardi
—	DF	MLT	Isaac Buhagiar
—	DF	MLT	John Cachia
—	DF	MLT	Kyle Cuschieri
—	DF	MLT	Idil Demicoli
—	DF	MLT	Beppe Jaccarini
—	DF	MLT	Nico Mifsud
—	DF	MLT	Jake Penza
—	DF	MLT	Ryan Polidano

No.	Pos.	Nation	Player
—	DF	MLT	Daniel John Sammut
—	MF	MLT	Jean Azzopardi
—	MF	MLT	James D'Agostino
—	MF	MLT	Nikolai Malcolm Dimech
—	MF	MLT	Matthew Fenech
—	MF	MLT	Shaun Kind
—	MF	MLT	Luke Mallia
—	MF	MLT	Matthew Nappa
—	MF	MLT	Matthew Scerri
—	MF	MLT	Nick Borg
—	MF	MLT	Jurgen Sciriha
—	FW	MLT	Kurt Borg
—	FW	MLT	Isaiah Micallef
—	FW	MLT	Nicholas Zammit

== Under 21 Team ==
The Ta' Xbiex S.C. Under 21 Team competes in the Youth competitions organized by the Malta Football Association and serves as a Development Squad for the Senior Team.

Note: Flags indicate national team as defined under FIFA eligibility rules; some limited exceptions apply. Players may hold more than one non-FIFA nationality.

No.	Pos.	Nation	Player
1	GK	MLT	Gianni Attard
3	DF	MLT	Liam Tabone
24	MF	LBA	Ahmed Gatlawi
29	DF	MLT	Alexander Apap Bologna
31	GK	MLT	Juan Ciappara
32	FW	MLT	Kleavon Sammut
35	MF	MLT	Jake Mac Kay
37	MF	MLT	Francesco Mifsud (on loan from Lija Athletic F.C.)
38	MF	MLT	Leon Tonna
40	MF	MLT	Thomas Grech
41	MF	MLT	Danilo Bonanno
43	MF	MLT	Nedved Cassar
44	DF	MLT	Niall Hili (on loan from Luqa St. Andrew's F.C.)
47	MF	MLT	Jamie Micallef

No.	Pos.	Nation	Player
49	DF	MLT	Kaiden Gatt (on loan from Luqa St. Andrew's F.C.)
63	MF	MLT	Zak Azzopardi
66	DF	MLT	Beppe Gauci
67	FW	MLT	Sirag Altriki
70	MF	SRB	Vuk Dimitrijevic
71	DF	MLT	Josef Said
74	DF	MLT	Noah Vidal
83	FW	MLT	Dias Galea
87	MF	MLT	Andrea De Marco
99	MF	MLT	Jamie Brincat
—	DF	MLT	Kieran Pace
—	MF	MLT	Sean Schembri Wismayer
—	FW	MLT	Rory Zammit

== Coaching staff ==
Position	Name
Head coach	(Brazil) Anderson Meyar De Melo
Assistant Coach	(Malta) Jake Azzopardi
Goalkeeping Coach	(Colombia) Daniel Alejandro Suárez Piñeres
Team Manager	(Germany) Thomas Westphal
Kit Manager	(Malta)
Physiotherapist	(Hungary) László Maruscsák

== Club Officials ==
Position	Name
President	(Germany) Juergen Friedrich Fischer
Vice President (Internal Affairs)	(Germany) Dr Joerg Werner
Vice President (External Affairs)	(Malta) Paul Wismayer
Vice President (MFA Relations)	(Malta) Eugenio Muscat
Club Secretary	(Malta) Dr Matthew Charles Zammit
Assistant Club Secretary	(Germany) Dr Joerg Werner
Treasurer	(Malta) Cleven Attard
Assistant Treasurer	(Malta) Christian Wismayer
Delegate 1	(Malta) Eugenio Muscat
Delegate 2	(Malta) Christian Wismayer
Club Legal Counsel	(Malta) Dr Patrick Gatt
Sporting Director	(Germany) Thomas Westphal

== Venues ==
Ta' Xbiex S.C. is located in Malta
Pembroke	Mosta
Luxol Stadium	Charles Abela Stadium
Capacity: 600	Capacity: 700
San Pawl il-Baħar	Ta' Qali
Sirens Stadium	Centenary Stadium
Capacity: 800	Capacity: 3,000

== Domestic ==
The recent season-by-season performance of the club:

Season	Division	Tier	Position
1998-99	Maltese Third Division	IV	6th
1999-00	Maltese Third Division	IV	15th
2000-01	Maltese Third Division	IV	15th
2002-03	Maltese Third Division	IV	16th
2003-04	Maltese Third Division	IV	15th
2004-05	Maltese Third Division	IV	17th
2005-06	Maltese Third Division	IV	17th
2006-07	Maltese Third Division	IV	19th
2012-13	Maltese Third Division	IV	15th
2013-14	Maltese Third Division	IV	12th
2014-15	Maltese Third Division	IV	13th
2015-16	Maltese Third Division	IV	13th
2016-17	Maltese Third Division	IV	12th
2017-18	Maltese Third Division	IV	11th
2019-20	Maltese Third Division	IV	12th ↑
2020-21	Maltese Amateur League	III	7th
2021-22	Maltese Amateur League	III	9th
2022-23	Maltese Amateur League	III	11th
2023-24	Maltese Amateur League	III	11th ↓
2024-25	Maltese Amateur League II	IV	9th

- With the introduction of the Maltese Amateur League in 2020, all clubs in the Maltese Third Division moved 1 tier up.

== Futsal ==
Ta' Xbiex FC Futsal competed in the Maltese Futsal League until 2025. They were known as Ta' Xbiex FC Futsal Izola Bank until the previous season. However, in their final season, they placed 3rd out 9 teams, while in the previous season they earned 7th place out of 11 teams. In the 2022–23 season Ta' Xbiex Izola Bank finished in 3rd place and qualified for the Premier League. After another 3rd spot, Ta' Xbiex lost to Swieqi United Futsal in the semi-finals. They repeated the result from the 2021–22 season when they were defeated by Luxol St. Andrews.
