= Adolfo Sormani =

Italian footballer and coach (born 1965)

Personal information
- Date of birth: 11 August 1965 (age 61)
- Place of birth: Naples, Italy
- Height: 1.74 m (5 ft 8 1/2 in)
- Position: Midfielder

Youth career
- –1983: Napoli

Senior career*
Years	Team	Apps	(Gls)
1983–1984	Napoli	0	(0)
1984–1986	Rimini	60	(1)
1986–1987	Parma	22	(1)
1987–1990	Avellino	33	(2)
1990–1991	Viareggio	19	(1)
1991–1993	Nola	30	(1)
1993–1995	Caerano	48	(4)
1995–1998	Mestre	83	(8)
1998–1999	Pordenone	30	(2)
1999–2000	Mestre	13	(0)
Total		338	(20)

Managerial career
- 2003–2004: Conegliano
- 2004–2006: Chioggia Sottomarina
- 2006–2007: Cattolica
- 2007–2010: Juventus (Youth)
- 2011–2012: Napoli (Youth)
- 2012–2013: Watford (Assistant)
- 2014–2015: Südtirol
- 2016: Partizani
- 2017: Wuhan Zall (Assistant)
- 2017–2019: Vejle Boldklub
- 2020: Partizani
- 2021: Lavello
- 2023–2025: HB
- * Club domestic league appearances and goals

Adolfo Sormani (born 11 August 1965) is an Italian retired footballer and current head coach. He is the son of former footballer and coach Angelo Sormani.

== Playing career ==
A Napoli youth product, he has mostly played in the minor divisions of Italy, except for a short stint at Avellino.

== Coaching career ==
Following his retirement as a player, Sormani became a coach and served in the youth teams of Juventus and Napoli as well. He was an assistant coach at Watford and the Chinese club Zall.

He briefly served in 2016 as head coach of Albanian team Partizani Tirana. Successively he was appointed in charge of Danish second division club Vejle Boldklub, guiding them to promotion before leaving in 2019.

After a short return at Partizani Tirana in 2020, he was named new head coach of Serie D club Lavello before being fired in November 2021. From 2023, he was head coach at Havnar Bóltfelag, Faroe Islands. On 4 May 2025 he left HB by mutual consent.
