= Oliver Spiteri =

Maltese manager and former footballer (born 1970)

Personal information
- Full name: Oliver Spiteri
- Date of birth: 4 July 1970 (age 56)
- Place of birth: Attard, Malta
- Height: 5 ft 10 in (1.78 m)
- Position: Midfielder

Senior career*
Years	Team	Apps	(Gls)
1986–1990	Birkirkara		
1990–1997	St. Lucia		
1997–1998	Żabbar St. Patrick's		
1998–2000	Birkirkara		
1998–2000	Lija Athletic		

Managerial career
- 2003–2004: Birkirkara U16
- 2004: Qormi
- 2004–2005: Birkirkara U19
- 2005–2006: Marsaxlokk
- 2006–2009: Malta U17
- 2009–2011: Mosta
- 2012–2014: Vittoriosa Stars
- 2014–2017: Balzan
- 2017–2019: Naxxar Lions
- 2019–2022: St. Lucia
- 2022–2024: Balzan
- 2024–: Victoria Hotspurs
- * Club domestic league appearances and goals

Oliver Spiteri (born 4 July 1970) is a Maltese manager and former footballer, current manager of Victoria Hotspurs.

== Playing career ==
Spiteri was born in Attard. He started playing with his hometown Birkirkara at a young age. He then moved to St. Lucia where he won promotion to the Maltese First Division. Afterward, he joined Żabbar St. Patrick's and again won promotion to the Premier League. After two seasons he moved again to Birkirkara for two seasons. During these two seasons, Birkirkara won all major trophies in Malta and in the 1999–2000 season they were crowned league winners for the first time in their history. Spiteri ended up his career with Lija Athletic, where they won promotion for the Premier League in the 2000–01 season.

== Managerial career ==
Spiteri's coaching career started with the youth team of Birkirkara. In 2005, he joined Qormi in the Maltese Second Division. However, in October 2006, he was taken by Ray Farrugia as his assistant with Marsaxlokk. The club finished third in the league and Spiteri was appointed head coach of the team for the UEFA Intertoto Cup. In the first game, they obtained a prestigious 1–1 draw on home soil in their first outing against Zrinjski Mostar. From 2006 to 2009, Spiteri was appointed as coach for the Malta national under-17 team, and between 2007 and 2009 served as assistant to Dušan Fitzel with the Maltese national team.

After the national team experience, Spiteri coached numerous out clubs in Malta, including Mosta, Vittoriosa Stars, Balzan, and recently Naxxar Lions.

He is a UEFA A Pro licensed coach.

== Honours ==
=== As manager ===
Malta U17

- FISEC Games Gold Medal: 2008

Mosta

- Maltese First Division: third place 2010–11

Vittoriosa Stars

- Maltese First Division: runner-up 2012–13

Balzan

- Maltese FA Trophy: runner-up 2015–16
