= St. Venera Lightnings F.C. =

Maltese sports club

Santa Venera Lightnings
- Full name: Santa Venera Lightnings Football Club
- Nickname: Lightnings
- Founded: 1945; 80 years ago
- President: Joe Carbonaro
- Manager: Kurt James
- League: National Amateur League II
- 2024–25: National Amateur League, 10th of 10

Santa Venera Lightnings Football Club is a semi-professional football club based in the town of Santa Venera, Malta, which competes in the Maltese National Amateur League II. Their last major success came in 2018 when they won the 2017-18 BOV Division Three title ahead of Mellieħa.

In the following season, during a match against Kirkop United, Santa Venera player Yau Mun Law collapsed on the pitch, requiring a Malta FA paramedic to use an automatic external defibrilator. Mun Law survived the incident and went on to attend the rescheduled match, however concerns were raised around rules regarding medical attendance to lower league matches after it took an ambulance thirty minutes to arrive.

It was announced in June 2025 that Kurt James would take over as manager of the club for the 2025-26 season.

== Futsal ==
In September 2025, the MFA announced that Santa Venera Lightnings Futsal would take part in the forthcoming 2025–26 edition of the Maltese Futsal League.

== Current Squad ==
As of 22 July 2025

Note: Flags indicate national team as defined under FIFA eligibility rules; some limited exceptions apply. Players may hold more than one non-FIFA nationality.

No.	Pos.	Nation	Player
—	GK	MLT	Yandrick Cassar
—	GK	MLT	Fabian Aquilina
—	GK	MLT	Omar Saimi
—	DF	MLT	Ryan Bezzina
—	DF	MLT	Brandon Gaffa
—	DF	MLT	Leighton Pace
—	DF	MLT	John Clint Sciberras
—	DF	ENG	Liam Dimond
—	DF	MLT	Dave Vella
—	DF	MLT	Dylan Zahra
—	DF	MLT	Liam Hudson
—	DF	MLT	Caine Hudson
—	DF	MLT	Ian Caruana
—	DF	MLT	Roderick Theuma
—	DF	MLT	Gary Spiteri
—	DF	MLT	Malcolm Calleja
—	DF	MLT	Kyle Schembri
—	DF	MLT	Clayton Camilleri
—	DF	MLT	Dylan Gatt
—	DF	MLT	Gabriel Borg
—	DF	MLT	Ryan Zammit
—	DF	MLT	Alessandro Grech
—	DF	MLT	Malcolm Debattista
—	DF	MLT	Simon Vella
—	DF	MLT	Luke Calleja
—	DF	MLT	Axel Bonavia
—	DF	MLT	Steve Farrugia

No.	Pos.	Nation	Player
—	DF	MLT	Owen Gauci
—	DF	MLT	Conor Azzopardi
—	MF	MLT	Zack Camilleri
—	MF	MLT	Jordie Delia
—	MF	MLT	Jamie Lee Portelli
—	MF	MLT	Tony Vella Stanyer
—	MF	MLT	Josef Degabriele
—	MF	SUI	Evan Perniceni
—	MF	MLT	Liam Aquilina
—	MF	COL	Jorge Díaz
—	MF	MLT	Sebastian Fenech
—	MF	MLT	Jeremy Grixti
—	MF	MLT	Sean Ellul
—	MF	MLT	Luca Laferla
—	MF	MLT	Adrian Gatt
—	MF	MLT	Raphael Said
—	MF	MLT	Glenn Bonnici
—	MF	MLT	Fabio Attard
—	FW	FRA	Clary Kurs
—	FW	MLT	Neil Farrugia
—	FW	MLT	Eman Borg
—	FW	MLT	Jayden Borg
—	FW	MLT	Miguel Grima
—	FW	MLT	Kyle Mifsud
—	FW	MLT	Christopher Tanti
—	FW	MLT	Theo Catania

== Honours ==
- Third Division

Winners (1): 2017–18
