= Kalkara United F.C. =

Maltese football club

Kalkara United
- Full name: Kalkara United Football Club
- Nicknames: Greens, Ħodor
- Founded: 2004; 22 years ago
- Ground: Kalkara F.C. Stadium
- Capacity: (Work in Progress)
- Chairman: Joseph Pisani
- Manager: Paul Bugeja
- League: National Amateur League
- 2021–22: National Amateur League, Group A, 4th

Kalkara United Football Club is a Maltese football club from the seaside village of Kalkara, overlooking the Grand Harbour in Malta, which currently play in the Maltese Amateur League A.They also play in the annual Maltese FA Trophy.

== History ==
Football in Kalkara has deep roots and club-wise, can be divided into three periods. Although traces of football in the community go back to 1913, immediately after the second World War, Kalkara United took part in the 3rd Division, with modest success between 1946 and 1949. In 1971 the club was re-formed and nine years later won the 3rd Division Championship (1980). But apart from another 3rd to 2nd Division promotion in 1987, the club had little success in the MFA, closing their doors in 1997. However, in 2004, the current club were formed under the name Kalkara FC, changing their name into the more traditional version of Kalkara United in 2019. So far, their most memorable season has been the 3rd Division 2016/17 campaign, winning the Championship unbeaten with a fine crop of players. The club runs a successful youth nursery and at their training grounds, a new turf pitch was inaugurated in 2010 and eight years later, a new club house was opened.

== Honours ==
- Maltese Third Division
  - Champions (2): 1995–96, 2016–17

== Statistics ==
The recent season-by-season performance of the club:

Season	Division	Tier	Position
1996-97	Maltese Third Division	IV	5th
2004-05	Maltese Third Division	IV	16th
2005-06	Maltese Third Division	IV	11th
2006-07	Maltese Third Division	IV	11th
2007-08	Maltese Third Division	IV	8th
2008-09	Maltese Third Division	IV	5th
2011-12	Maltese Third Division	IV	14th
2012-13	Maltese Third Division	IV	10th
2013-14	Maltese Third Division	IV	14th
2014-15	Maltese Third Division	IV	9th
2015-16	Maltese Third Division	IV	11th
2016-17	Maltese Third Division	IV	1st ↑
2017-18	Maltese Second Division	III	8th
2018-19	Maltese Second Division	III	8th
2019-20	Maltese Second Division	III	8th
2020-21	Maltese Amateur League	III	5th
2021-22	Maltese Amateur League	III	4th
2022-23	Maltese Amateur League	III	4th
2023-24	Maltese Amateur League	III	11th ↓
2024-25	Maltese Amateur League II	IV	
