= Victoria Hotspurs F.C. =

Maltese football club

Victoria Hotspurs
- Full name: Victoria Hotspurs Football Club
- Nicknames: Il-Hotspurs; Tas-Sitt Xhur
- Short name: VHS
- Founded: 1948; 78 years ago
- Stadium: Various
- President: Dr. Anton Tabone
- Head coach: Edgar Degabriele
- League: Maltese Challenge League
- 2025-26: Maltese National Amateur League I (2nd)
- Website: https://www.victoriahotspursfc.com/
Home colours	Away colours

Victoria Hotspurs Football Club is a Maltese semi-professional football club from the town of Victoria, Gozo. From the 2024–25 season it has switched from the Gozo football league system to the Maltese.

The club was founded in 1948 and, prior to their migration, has won 13 Gozo First Division titles, the last one in the 2018–19 season. The club is popularly known simply as il-Hotspurs. In 2000, when they won their tenth title, they became the first Gozitan club to be awarded a Golden Star for Sport Excellence.

Moreover, Victoria Hotspurs also became the first - and so far the only - club competing in the Gozo Football League who had a Gozitan player from their ranks debuting and representing Malta in international football matches. The club also holds the record for the most consecutive wins across all domestic competitions in Malta, a run stretching to 32 matches.

== History ==
=== Early days ===
The Victoria Hotspurs Football Club was formed in December 1948 by Dr. Antoine Mercieca M.D. with the help of Gigi Xuereb and Alfred Attard. The club's original name was Victoria Hotspur, since its first president Antoine Mercieca M.D., was a fervent supporter of Tottenham Hotspur. Nicknamed The Hospitals, Victoria Hotspur had its first premises in the old Gozo Hospital in St. Francis Square. The first three matches were played with players wearing shirts borrowed from the Gozo Hospital. Later on, red shirts with white sleeves, together with white shorts, were bought from the sister island of Malta. Victoria Hotspurs Football Club played its first friendly match against the Salesian Youths, losing 1–2. Its first official Gozo Football League match was played against Ghajnsielem Rangers on 30 January 1948, with Victoria Hotspurs winning the game 2–1. After finishing second to Salesian Youths, Victoria Hotspurs won their first Galea Cup after defeating RAF(Gozo) 6–1.

=== Golden days ===
The golden years for the club were between 1957 and 1970. Re-organized again in 1957, Victoria Hotspurs won the Second Division League, amongst others, such as the Dingli Cup, the Tapie Second Division and the MG Second Knock Out, in Season 1958 – 1959. In December 1959, Victoria Hotspurs had its first official club, which was better known as Tal-Luqa in St. Francis Square. In 1960, Victoria Hotspurs played their first friendly game on Sicily against Oratorio Salesiano San Gregorio, with the game ending 1–1. Joe Camilleri, the club's longest serving captain, scored for the Hotspurs. Victoria Hotspurs won its first League Championship in 1961–62. After clinching the title, Victoria Hotspurs played a friendly game against the then Malta champions, Floriana F.C., on 3 June 1962, with the greens winning 4–3. The season which took place between the years 1962–63 commenced with Victoria Hotspurs winning the second Galea Cup and also the second League Championship. During this season, Vincent Grech was the first Victoria Hotspurs player to win the prestigious title of the Gozo Football Player of the Year.

Victoria Hotspurs won the Esso Cup for the first time in 1963–64, yet lost the League Championship of the same season. Xaghra Young Stars filed a protest with the Gozo Football Association (GFA) and consequently, Victoria Hotspurs lost the replay 1–2. During this season Victoria Hotspurs won the first Reserves League.

The following year, Victoria Hotspurs won the third League Championship and the first Independence Cup. Success followed, and Victoria Hotspurs won the fourth League Championship and the Esso Cup for the second time. Again, Victoria Hotspurs dominated the 1966–67 season, winning the fifth League Championship and the third Esso Cup. Victoria Hotspurs also won their third Galea Cup during season 1968–1969.

=== The seventies ===
Although Victoria Hotspurs were very close to winning the League Championship during the season 1973–1974, the Club did not manage to win any trophy during the seventies. Despite this, in October 1977, Victoria Hotspurs was the first Gozitan team to win against a foreign football team in the Silver Jubilee Ground. Victoria Hotspurs winning 2–1 against Awras, a Libyan First Division team from Derna.

=== Champions again ===
After an absence of several years, Victoria Hotspurs won their sixth League Championship in the season of 1979–80. Under the guidelines of Dutch coach Albert Lemmen, the title was decided after winning a three games decider against Sannat Lions. Victoria Hotspurs won 1–0, with Tarcisio Galea scoring the winning goal. Victoria Hotspurs won their first Republic Cup in 1980–1981 season after winning against rivals Sannat Lions. During the season of 1989–1990, ex-player Vincent Grech took over the role of Coach. Victoria Hotspurs won their first Super Cup during this season.

Following the first Super Cup, Victoria Hotspurs won the eight League Championship during the 1990–91 season after defeating Xewkija Tigers in a title decider, with Michael Cremona and Silvan Debono scoring. Victoria Hotspurs won again the Super Cup during 1991 and 1992. The League Championship was back in Victoria during season 1993–94. During this season, Victoria Hotspurs also won the Super Cup, yet lost the final of the GFA Cup to Ghajnsielem F.C. after the penalty shootout. During the season 1995–96, Victoria Hotspurs won the Super Cup after winning 1–0 against Nadur Youngsters, with Sabri Rais scoring. Rais was again decisive when he scored four goals in the final of the GFA Cup during season 1996–97 against Xaghra United. This was the first and the only GFA Cup Victoria Hotspurs won so far. During this season, Victoria Hotspurs won again the Super Cup and the Republic Cup. Victoria Hotspurs player Dione Lautier won the Gozo Football Player of the year award.

=== The New Millennium ===
Hotspurs' former emblem bearing star signifying the 10 leagues won

Victoria Hotspurs reached their tenth League Championship in season 1999–2000. Dominic Grech was back at the club as coach. During this season, Victoria Hotspurs won again the Super Cup and the Millennium Cup after beating Zebbug Rangers 2–1, with Michael Vella scoring the golden goal. Victoria Hotspurs was the first Gozitan team to reach the tenth League Championship. Hotspurs player Reuben Mercieca won the Gozo Football player of the year.

Victoria Hotspurs suffered relegation from the Gozo First division in season 2004–2005 and bounced back two years after. After absence of a few years, Victoria Hotspurs were back as champions of the Gozo Football league in season 2009–2010. Under the guidelines of ex-player Christopher Buttigieg, Victoria Hotspurs won the League Championship for the eleventh time together with the Super Cup, the Freedom Cup and Independence Cup. Victoria Hotspurs player John Paul Grima won the Gozo Football player of the year.

=== The 70th anniversary ===
The season 2017–18 marked the seventieth anniversary of Victoria Hotspurs. With Anton Tabone back as president, Victoria Hotspurs were back as league champions for the twelfth time with a record total of points. Ex-player Gotthard Conti was back at the club, this time as coach. Victoria Hotspurs won their 13th league Championship in 2018–19, the GFA Super Cup and the BOV GFA Cup after beating Nadur Youngsters 3–2.

On 22 August 2019, Victoria Hotspurs played a friendly match against Calcio Catania at the Stadio Torre Del Grifo. The Italians won the game 3–2, with Elton Silva scoring both goals for the Hotspurs.

=== Switch to Malta ===
On 26 February 2024, the club issued an official statement confirming they applied to become a member of the Malta Football Association with the aim of starting participating in the Maltese football league system, specifically the Maltese National Amateur League. The application was approved on 30 April 2024.

In the first season, Victoria Hotspurs participated in the Maltese National Amateur League II and won the promotion to the Maltese National Amateur League I, following the 16th consecutive league win in February 2025. During the same season, the Hotspurs also established a record for the most consecutive wins across all domestic competitions in Malta, a run stretching to 32 matches, ended against the then Malta Premier League Opening Round winners Floriana in a round of 16 match valid for the Maltese FA Trophy. In the debut season, Victoria Hotspurs also won the National Amateur Cup, courtesy of a 2-1 win over Qrendi, and were runners up against Birżebbuġa St. Peter's in the National Amateur Super Cup.

In the second season following the switch, Hotspurs faced Birkirkara in the round of 32 of the Jubilee Cup. After going ahead, they lost penalties. During the same season, Victoria Hotspurs secured promotion to the Maltese Challenge League, courtesy of a win over Mqabba, and ended runners-up in the National Amateur Cup after the lose to Qormi in the final.

== Rivalries ==
Victoria Hotspurs's traditional rivals are fellow cross-city rivals Victoria Wanderers and Oratory Youths. This rivalry is quite unique within the Maltese islands, given that both in Malta and Gozo the statute of the Malta Football Association and the Gozo Football Association limits one club for each city, town or village.

This rivalry was brought to the fore when following the Hotspurs' move to Malta, Victoria Wanderers and Oratory Youths colluded and spearheaded a change to the statute of the Gozo Football Association - headed by the brother of Victoria Wanderers' president - to reduce the number of the clubs that may represent Victoria to two. So long this change remains in place, the Hotspurs will be prevented from returning to Gozitan football as a representative of Victoria.

== Players ==
As of 16 August 2026

=== First-team squad ===
Note: Flags indicate national team as defined under FIFA eligibility rules; some limited exceptions apply. Players may hold more than one non-FIFA nationality.

No.	Pos.	Nation	Player
1	GK	MLT	Steve Sultana (vice-captain)
3	DF	MLT	Ferdinando Apap (captain)
4	DF	MLT	Lawrence Grima
5	DF	MLT	Miguel D'Alessandro
6	DF	MLT	Luke Tabone
7	MF	MLT	Jake Ghio
8	MF	MLT	Paul Fenech
9	FW	BRA	Arthur Stelmach
10	MF	BRA	Cláudio Murici
11	FW	BRA	Thiago Nonato
14	MF	MLT	Kurt Bajada

No.	Pos.	Nation	Player
15	MF	MLT	Kyle Sciberras Balbi
18	DF	MLT	Sheldon Mizzi
21	MF	BUL	Emil Grozdanov
23	MF	MLT	Chris Mercieca
30	DF	MLT	Karl Micallef
33	DF	MLT	Zeron Azzopardi
37	GK	MLT	Reece Cutajar
70	FW	MLT	Lydon Micallef
74	DF	MLT	Andreas Vella
77	MF	MLT	Zachary Brincat

== Technical staff ==
As of 21 November 2026

Position	Staff
Head coach	Edgar Degabriele
Assistant coach	John Paul Gialanze
Goalkeeper coach	Mark Vella
Physical trainer	Martin Hrubsa
Youth coach	Oscar Alvarado Guerrero
Physio	Nathan Mamo
Team manager	Marvin Buttigieg
Kit manager	Joel Portelli
Assistant kit manager	Robert Farrugia

== Honours ==
=== Gozo ===
- Gozo First Division: 13
  - 1961–62, 1962–63, 1964–65, 1965–66, 1966–67, 1979–80, 1984–85, 1990–91, 1993–94, 1999–00, 2009–10, 2017–18, 2018–19
- Gozo Second Division: 3
  - 1958–59, 2006–07, 2023–24
- GFA Super Cup: 9
  - 1989–90, 1990–91, 1991–92, 1993–94, 1995–96, 1996–97, 1999–00, 2009–10, 2018–19
- Esso Cup: 3
  - 1963–64, 1965–66, 1966–67
- Republic Cup: 2
  - 1980–81, 1996–97
- Civil Council Cup: 1
  - 1971–72
- Galea Cup: 3
  - 1948–49, 1962–63, 1968–69
- Independence Cup: 4
  - 1964–65, 1997–98, 2008–09, 2009–10
- Dingli Cup: 1
  - 1958–59
- Millenium Cup: 1
  - 1999–00
- GFA Cup: 2
  - 1996–97, 2018–19
- Gozo First Division KO: 1
  - 2017–18
- Second Division Knock-Out: 2
  - 2006–07, 2023–24
- Second Division Challenge Cup: 1
  - 2023–24
- Freedom Day Cup: 2
  - 2007–08, 2009–2010
- Good Conduct Cup: 1
  - 1972–73
- Tapie 2nd Div. Cup: 1
  - 1958–59
- Premier Knock–out: 1
  - 1997–98
- MG 2nd Knock–out: 1
  - 1958–59

=== Malta ===
==== League ====
- National Amateur League II (Level 4): 1
  - 2024–25

==== Cup ====
- National Amateur Cup
  - 2024–25

== League and cup history ==
=== Gozo ===
Season	League									Cups
Season	Div.	Pos.	Pl.	W	D	L	GS	GA	P	Cups
1948–49	First	2	6	4	0	2	14	9	8	Galea Cup (1)
1949–50	Competition not held									
1950–51	Competition not held									
1951–52	Competition not held									
1952–53	First	3	6	3	0	3	13	11	6	
1953–54	Competition not held									
1954–55	Did not participate									
1955–56	Competition not held									
1956–57	Did not participate									
1957–58	Did not participate									
1958–59	Second	1 (1)	6	5	0	1	12	2	10	Dingli Cup; Tapie 2nd Division Cup; MG 2nd KO
1959–60	Did not participate									
1960–61	Competition abandoned due to problems within the GFA									
1961–62	First	1 (1)	8	6	0	2	16	7	12	
1962–63	First	1 (2)	6	3	3	0	9	3	9	Galea Cup (2)
1963–64	First	3	6	2	2	2	9	9	6	Esso Cup (1)
1964–65	First	1 (3)	10	8	2	0	15	3	18	Independence Cup (1)
1965–66	First	1 (4)	6	5	1	0	23	3	11	Esso Cup (2)
1966–67	First	1 (5)	8	7	0	1	18	4	14	Esso Cup (3)
1967–68	First	3	8	3	1	4	9	10	7	
1968–69	First	4	10	3	4	3	15	15	10	Galea Cup (3)
1969–70	First	2	8	4	1	3	16	10	9	
1970–71	First	5	10	3	1	6	9	15	7	
1971–72	First	3	10	4	3	3	9	8	11	Civic Council Cup
1972–73	First	3	10	3	4	3	7	9	10	Good Conduct Cup
1973–74	First	2	10	6	2	2	10	5	14	
1974–75	First	5	20	9	7	4	34	17	25	
1975–76	First	5	12	4	4	4	7	10	12	
1976–77	First	3	12	5	3	4	18	13	13	
1977–78	First	3	12	5	5	2	9	5	15	
1978–79	First	3	12	5	5	2	14	7	15	
1979–80	First	1 (6)	12	6	6	0	17	6	18	
1980–81	First	4	12	3	5	4	16	14	11	Republic Cup (1)
1981–82	First	4	12	1	8	3	10	13	10	
1982–83	First	3	10	3	6	1	6	4	12	
1983–84	First	5	10	3	1	6	6	10	7	
1984–85	First	1 (7)	10	3	5	2	6	3	11	
1985–86	First	5	14	3	5	6	7	12	11	
1986–87	First	2	10	6	3	1	15	1	15	
1987–88	First	2	12	8	2	2	16	8	18	
1988–89	First	5	12	3	3	6	4	8	9	
1989–90	First	4	14	4	6	4	14	11	14	GFA Super Cup (1)
1990–91	First	1 (8)	14	11	2	1	22	10	24	GFA Super Cup (2)
1991–92	First	3	14	6	3	5	21	16	17	GFA Super Cup (3)
1992–93	First	3	14	5	6	3	12	9	21	
1993–94	First	1 (9)	14	11	1	2	31	7	34	GFA Super Cup (4)
1994–95	First	6	14	5	4	5	25	23	19	
1995–96	First	2	14	8	4	2	37	12	28	GFA Super Cup (5)
1996–97	First	2	16	8	2	6	35	35	26	GFA Super Cup (6); GFA Cup (1); Republic Cup (2)
1997–98	First	3	16	6	3	7	36	30	21	Independence Cup (2); Premier KO
1998–99	First	5	16	2	3	11	19	50	9	
1999–00	First	1	14	9	3	2	34	17	30	GFA Super Cup (7); Millenium Cup
2000–01	First	5	14	6	4	4	21	16	22	
2001–02	First	5	12	6	2	6	25	34	14	
2002–03	First	5	18	6	4	8	25	23	22	
2003–04	First	4	18	5	5	8	32	38	20	
2004–05	First	7	18	0	4	14	16	42	4	
2005–06	Second	2	15	7	6	2	22	13	27	
2006–07	Second	1 (2)	15	14	0	1	38	14	42	Second Division KO (1)
2007–08	First	2	18	11	4	3	40	25	37	Freedom Day Cup (1)
2008–09	First	3	18	9	2	7	34	28	29	Independence Cup (3)
2009–10	First	1 (11)	18	10	4	4	40	16	34	GFA Super Cup (8); Independence Cup (4); Freedom Day Cup (2)
2010–11	First	4	18	6	4	8	32	37	22	
2011–12	First	6	18	4	4	10	24	40	16	
2012–13	First	5	18	6	3	9	27	30	21	
2013–14	First	4	20	8	4	8	34	31	28	
2014–15	First	3	20	7	4	9	35	33	25	
2015–16	First	4	18	8	2	8	27	33	26	
2016–17	First	5	21	8	6	7	27	28	30	
2017–18	First	1 (12)	21	19	1	1	63	15	58	Gozo First Division KO
2018–19	First	1 (13)	21	19	1	1	68	22	58	GFA Super Cup (9); GFA Cup (2)
2019–20	First	3	15	9	1	5	40	18	28	
2020–21	First	2	9	6	1	2	30	11	19	
2021–22	First	4	21	8	6	7	36	33	30	
2022–23	First	7	20	4	4	12	32	45	16	
2023–24	Second	1 (3)	15	13	1	1	55	10	40	Second Division KO (2); Second Division Challenge Cup

=== Malta ===
Season	League										Cups	
Season	Div.	Pos.	Pl.	W	D	L	GS	GA	P	Top Scorer	Trophy (Rnds)	League (Rnds)
2024–25	Fourth	1 (1)	21	20	1	0	72	8	61	(Brazil) Rondinely (17)	Round of 16 (3)	Winners (1) (5)
2025–26	Third	2	26	17	3	6	51	24	54	(Brazil) Rondinely (15)	Round of 32 (2)	Runners-up (5)

== Presidents ==
As of 28 May 2025

- Antoine Mercieca (founder) (1948–49)
- Willie Grima (1949–50)
- Anton Tabone (1952–53)
- Fredu Attard (1958–59)
- Victor Attard Bondi (1959–69)
- Rikkardu Ellis (1969–74)
- Guzeppi Attard (1974–75)
- Fredu Attard (1975–76)
- Michael Camilleri (1976–77)
- John Cini (1977–78)
- Rikardu Ellis (1978–79)
- George Said (1979–84)
- Victor Borg (1984–85)
- George Said (1985–86)
- George Said / Joseph Ellis (1986–87)
- Joseph Ellis (1987–89)
- George Said (1989–01)
- Anton Tabone (2001–05)
- Reuben Grech (2005–07)
- George Said (2007–15)
- Geoffrey Attard (2015–17)
- Anton Tabone (2017–20)
- Joseph Grech (2020–21)
- Dione Lautier (2021–23)
- Anton Tabone (2023–present)

== Records and statistics ==
As of 10 May 2026, following switch to Malta

=== Overall record by competition ===
Competition	App.	Seasons	P	W	D	L	F	A	GD	Best result
Overall			66	50	6	10	174	51	123	
Leagues			47	37	4	6	123	32	91	
National Amateur League I (3rd)	1	2025–26	26	17	3	6	51	24	27	Runners-up
National Amateur League II (4th)	1	2024–25	21	20	1	0	72	8	64	Winners
Cups			19	13	2	4	51	19	32	
FA Trophy	2	2024–26	5	3	0	2	12	11	1	Round of 16
Jubilee Cup	1	2025–26	3	2	1	0	8	2	6	Round of 32
National Amateur Cup	2	2024–26	10	8	1	1	28	13	15	Winners
National Amateur Super Cup	1	2024–25	1	0	0	1	0	1	-1	Runners-up

=== Record victories ===
- League
  - Maltese National Amateur League I: 5–0 v Lija Athletic
  - Maltese National Amateur League II: 7–0 v St. Venera Lightnings
- Cup
  - Maltese FA Trophy: 5–1 v Xagħra United (R32)
  - Jubilee Cup: 4–0 v Siggiewi (1st)
  - National Amateur Cup: 6–1 v St. Lawrence Spurs (1st)

=== Record losses ===
- League
  - Maltese National Amateur League I: 1–3 v Qormi, Kirkop United & Senglea Athletic
- Cup
  - Maltese FA Trophy: 0–5 v Hamrun Spartans (R32)
  - National Amateur Cup: 0–4 v Qormi (F)
  - National Amateur Super Cup: 0–1 (aet) v Birzebbuga St. Peter's (F)

=== Sequence records ===
- Longest winning run: 18 matches
  - Longest league winning run: 18 matches
- Longest run without losing: 18 matches
  - Longest league run without losing: 21 matches
- Longest winless run: 4 matches
  - Longest league winless run: 2 matches

=== Player records ===
- Appearances: (Malta) (Gozo) Shaun Attard & (Malta) (Gozo) Lawrence Grima – 63 matches
- Goals: (Brazil) Rondinely – 40 goals
- Clean sheets: (Malta) (Gozo) Steve Sultana – 15 clean sheets
- Youngest player: (Malta) (Gozo) Andrew Grima – 16 years 11 months
- Oldest player: (Malta) Roderick Briffa – 43 years 8 months 18 days

== Managerial, captain and kit history ==
As of 10 May 2026

Manager	Captain	Season	Pl.	W	D	L	GS	GA	GD	W%	Honours	Kit	Sponsor
(Malta); Oliver Spiteri	(Malta) (Gozo); Ferdinando Apap	2024–25	30	27	1	2	95	17	78	90%	MNAL II; NAC	Joma	Visit Gozo
(Malta); Oliver Spiteri	(Malta) (Gozo); Ferdinando Apap	2025–26	36	23	5	8	79	34	45	64%		Joma	med.TV

== Youths ==
Victoria Hotspurs debuted in the Malta Youth League in the season 2025–26, starting from the bottom division.

Season	Coach	League										Cups
Season	Coach	Div.	Pos.	Pl.	W	D	L	GS	GA	P	Top Scorer	Knockout (Rnds)
2025–26	(Colombia) Óscar Guerrero	Fourth	6	13	6	2	5	32	18	20	(Malta) (Gozo) Joseph Saliba (9)	Did not enter

== Academy ==
In January 2025, Victoria Hotspurs established the Victoria Hotspurs Youth Development Academy in collaboration with Luxol St. Andrew’s Football Academy.
