= Maltese football league system =

Association football leagues in Malta

The Maltese football leagues system of association football is made up of a set of leagues organised and controlled by the Malta Football Association. Malta has had a top level football division since 1909; and only the Maltese Premier League is considered Professional. It continues on today with the current system.

== Previous Formats ==
=== Pre-2011/12 Format ===
This system included four tiers. All of the leagues are currently sponsored by Bank of Valletta:

Level	League/Division
1	Maltese Premier League; 10 clubs
2	Maltese First Division; 10 clubs
3	Maltese Second Division; 10 clubs
4	Maltese Third Division; 21 clubs in two groups

The Maltese Premier League is probably most criticised for a format that is similar to that of the Scottish Premier League, where the league is split up into two phases, a first one with two rounds (home and away – formally, since the league is played within three or four stadiums only), and the second phase accommodates a split of the 12 teams into a Championship Pool (top six teams) and the Relegation Pool (bottom six teams). Also, a particular characteristic of the Maltese Premier League is that once the split takes place, the points gathered in the previous two rounds, are halved, supposedly to create more competition.

In parallel to these leagues run a number of Knock Out competitions, the most prominent one being the FA Trophy.

=== 2011-12 to 2017/18 Format ===
On January 13, 2011, the Malta Football Association decided to restructure the format of the leagues as from season 2011–12.

Thus the system in force from season 2011–12 came to read:

Level	League/Division
1	Maltese Premier League; 12 clubs
2	Maltese First Division; 14 clubs
3	Maltese Second Division; 14 clubs
4	Maltese Third Division; 13 clubs

=== 2017/18 to 2019/20 Format ===
Once again, the Malta Football Association decided to restructure the format of the leagues. As from the season 2017/18, the Maltese Premier League started having 14 clubs competing at the top level of Maltese football. For the first time in decades, the Maltese Premier League started having two rounds, each team playing the other twice, and not splitting the points in half at any stage.

Thus from the season 2017/18, the format was changed to as follows:

Level	League/Division
1	Maltese Premier League; 14 clubs
2	Maltese First Division; 14 clubs
3	Maltese Second Division; 13 clubs
4	Maltese Third Division; 12 clubs

The main noticeable change in format was the introduction of a promotion-relegation play-off to take place across all the leagues in Malta. The 12th place team in each league was to play a one-match decider at a neutral ground against the team that finishes in 3rd place of the lower league. The winner of the decider was to take its place in the higher league in the following season.

== Current format ==
Following the early end of the 2019/20 season due to the COVID-19 pandemic, the beginning of the 2020-21 season saw a radically altered system, particularly for the divisions beneath the second tier, and changes to the names the divisions were given. The Premier League saw an increase to sixteen clubs with four automatic relegation places and a relegation play-off for whichever team finishes in twelfth place. The First Division was renamed as the Challenge League and saw an increase to fifteen clubs taking part with the two teams finishing in first and second gaining automatic promotion and the third placed team facing off against the twelfth placed team from the Premier League in a play-off to decide on who plays in the Premier League the following season. The bottom five teams will all be relegated to the tier below.

The biggest changes came from the restructuring of the Second and Third Divisions as they were merged into a single entity called the National Amateur League. The twenty-two clubs in this league are split into three groups with the winners of each gaining automatic promotion to the Challenge League. The nine teams in second to fourth in each of these groups enter a nine-team play-off with the winner gaining promotion to the Challenge League.

Level	League/Division
1	Premier League; 12 clubs
2	Challenge League; 16 clubs
3	National Amateur League I 12 clubs
4	National Amateur League II; 14 clubs

There are still hopes in the future that Gozitan clubs from the Gozo Football League First Division and the Gozo Football League Second Division may enter the Maltese Leagues and create a single competition for all the Maltese Islands and give the Gozitan teams the opportunity to compete in European competitions. There are also discussions going on over a potential re-structuring of the amateur football leagues in Malta to create a pyramid system as opposed to a series of single leagues.

== See also ==
- Maltese Premier League
- Football in Malta
- Malta Football Association
