= Marsaskala F.C. =

Maltese football club

- Full name: Marsaskala Football Club
- Founded: 2010; 16 years ago
- Manager: Brian Vella
- League: Maltese National Amateur League
- 2022–23: Maltese Challenge League 15th (relegated)
Home colours	Away colours

Marsaskala Football Club is a Maltese football club based in the south-eastern town of Marsaskala. In season 2021-22 the club was promoted for the first time to the Challenge League (formally known as division 1).

== 'The Beginning' ==
Eager to form a sporting club, a number of Marsaskala residents, notably Daniel Spiteri, Stephen Bell, Dr Zaid Teebi, Joseph Farrugia, Albert Spiteri and Dr. Owen Bonnici, built the team from scratch. They were later joined by Jesmond Mugliett and Dr Reuben Debono, with the latter becoming club president in the third season.

During the first season (2010–2011) the club finished second last and won the Fair Play award, while in the following season the club contracted Alan Mifsud, formerly of Zejtun Corinthians, as team manager in mid-season. The team finished in eighth position.

== Recent years ==
The 2012–2013 season saw the team with a completely revamped look, players and set-up with the inclusion of Joseph Cutajar as assistant coach. The 2012–2013 started with a 3–0 win over Victoria Hotspurs in the first round of the Maltese Trophy. Marsaskala FC went out in the fourth round against Zebbug Rangers. Marsaskala FC finished third in the league and therefore obtained promotion to the Second Division in their third season since their conception.

In November 2013, the club appointed a new coach, Louis Facciol who brought his assistant Frans Mallia. In their first four games at the helm they brought in three victories and a draw. Nevertheless, the club was relegated on the last day of the season.

For the 2014–2015 season Marsaskala appointed Vesko Petrović, formerly of Velez Mostar, Valletta FC and Zabbar St. Patrick as their new coach. Their aim was to consolidate their player pool base and they finished sixth. In June 2015, Petrović was confirmed as manager for the 2015–16 season and Buttigieg was re-elected as club president.

== Current squad ==
As of 26 March 2025

Note: Flags indicate national team as defined under FIFA eligibility rules; some limited exceptions apply. Players may hold more than one non-FIFA nationality.

No.	Pos.	Nation	Player
1	GK	MLT	Clyde Aquilina
2	DF	MLT	Kurt Zammit
3	DF	MLT	Charlo Buttigieg
3	DF	MLT	Kyle Selwyn Cutajar
4	DF	MLT	Paul Zammit
5	DF	MLT	Jacques Vella Critien
6	MF	MLT	Christopher Galea
7	MF	MLT	Jean Paul Dimech
8	MF	MLT	Jordan Busuttil
8	MF	MLT	Liam Bugeja
9	FW	IRL	Joshua Ojelabi
10	FW	MLT	Joseph Chetcuti
11	MF	NGA	James Oghenekewaro
12		MLT	Kieran Grech

No.	Pos.	Nation	Player
14		MLT	Redeemer Muscat
15		MLT	Jake Cassar Randich
16		MLT	James Degabriele
16		MLT	Jayden Degiorgio
16		FRA	Fathi Kader Yahia Azzazi
17		MLT	Anthony Pisani
18		MLT	Zack Agius
19		MLT	Kristjan Caruana Abela
19		MLT	Byron Madu
22		MLT	Lennon Pickard
22		MLT	Dior Muscat
23		MLT	Mikele Vella
50	GK	MLT	Craig Sultana
