= Żabbar St. Patrick F.C. =

Maltese football club

Żabbar St. Patrick
- Full name: Żabbar Saint Patrick Football Club
- Nickname: Yellows
- Founded: 1912; 114 years ago
- Ground: Il-Foss Ground
- Capacity: 1,000
- Chairman: Ryan Otto
- Manager: Adolfo Sormani
- League: Maltese Premier League
- 2025–26: MPL, 10th
Home colours	Away colours

Żabbar St. Patrick Football Club is a Maltese professional football club from the town of Żabbar, which currently plays in the Maltese Premier League. The club was founded in 1912. They also play in the annual Maltese FA Trophy.

== History ==
Although a football ground close to the Zabbar Gate already existed in 1903, the first teams in Żabbar were only formed a few years later in the first decade of the century. The Zabbar Gate Football Ground was considered as the home-ground of St. George's of Cospicua where they hosted some of the top army and navy teams that were visiting Malta at the time.

It was not until season 1935–36 when a team from Zabbar – Zabbar United – took part in a Malta Football Association competition. Zabbar United placed fifth in the Fourth Division Section A. The following season, Zabbar United placed fourth in Division IV Section B while another team, Zabbar Youngsters, placed fifth in Division IV Section A.

The first honour for a Zabbar side arrived in season 1937–38 when Zabbar Amateurs won Division IV Section A. However they lost the championship decider to Section B winners Pietà Hotspurs 1–2. Zabbar United were taking part in Section B, placing third. Both teams took part in the MFA Challenge Cup but were eliminated in the first round.

The next year, both Zabbar Amateurs and Zabbar United played in Division III. Zabbar Amateurs won Section B after beating Rabat FC 1–0 in a replay after a first decider ended in a 1–1 draw. Zabbar United placed third in Section A. In Season 1939–40, Zabbar Amateurs played in Division 2, placing third. During World War II, no leagues were organized but a team from Zabbar – Zabbar Stars took part in the 8th Army Cup in 1943.

MFA competitions were back in 1944 and Zabbar FC won the Division 2 Christmas Cup after beating Msida United 1–0 in the final. Zabbar played in Division 2 between 1944 and 1945 and 1947–48. They first took part in the FA Trophy in 1946 when they were eliminated by champions Ħamrun Spartans F.C.

The team participated as St. Patrick for the first time in the Second Division league Section A in 1948–49. The following season, they won Section A and hence the first promotion to the top division – Division 1. In Division 1 1950–51, they registered three wins in 14 matches to secure their status.

They were relegated in 1951–52 and played for eight years in Division 2, before winning the Second Division League in 1959–60. They stayed two years in the top division as they were relegated in 1961–62. St. Patrick finished sixth on level points with Lija Athletic in the Second Division League 1963–64. A relegation decider was necessary and Lija emerged as winners by five goals to nil. The Saints therefore had to play in Division 3.

They won the Division 3 Knock-Out in 1965 after beating Msida St-Joseph 1–0 in the final but had to wait until 1969–70 to win promotion after winning Division 3 Section C. Two years later, they won promotion to Division 1 as runners-up in Division 2. However they spent just one year in the top division before being relegated.

St. Patrick were relegated to Division 3 in 1975–76 but the following season they won Division 3 Section A, losing the championship decider to Rabat Ajax.

After being relegated once again, Zabbar won the Division 3 Knock-Out in 1979–80. They went on to win the Division 3 Championship, the Division 3 Knock-Out and the Sons of Malta Cup in 1980–81. The Zabbar side won the Division 2 Championship in 1981–82 and the Division 1 Championship in 1982–83. Zabbar therefore won promotion to the Premier League, however they were relegated the following season.

After being relegated to Division 2, there were successive promotions and relegations from Division 1 and 2. In Division 2, they were runners-up in 1986–87, champions in 1988–89 and section A runners-up, each time winning promotion. They also won the Division II/III Knock-Out in 1990–91.

St. Patrick were promoted to the Maltese Premier League as champions in 1995–96, runners-up in 1998–99 and once again champions in 2003–04.

In 2012, the club celebrated 100 years of football in Zabbar.

In 2013, the club renamed itself from St. Patrick to Zabbar St Patrick after a general meeting held on Sunday 10 June.

Zabbar St Patrick were promoted to the Maltese First Division at the end of the 2016–17 season, however they were relegated the season after.

In the season 2018–19, Zabbar St. Patrick finished the season in the 11th place and won the decider match against Msida Saint-Joseph F.C. to retain their place in the Maltese Second Division.

In 2021, the club underwent a significant administrative and financial restructuring following the appointment of South African businessman Ryan Otto as Chairman, later taking up the role of President in 2025. Otto, a major investor in the Shoreline real estate project at SmartCity Malta, introduced a professionalisation project aimed at returning the club to the Maltese Premier League.

Under this new investment, the club secured the Maltese National Amateur Cup in 2022 and achieved successive promotions. On 17 March 2024, the club mathematically confirmed its return to the Premier League for the first time in 20 years. In February 2026, the club appointed Maltese football icon Gilbert Agius as head coach to lead the professional squad. In September 2026, Italian manager Adolfo Sormani was appointed as the club's new head coach.

== Current squad ==
As of 19 October 2026

Note: Flags indicate national team as defined under FIFA eligibility rules; some limited exceptions apply. Players may hold more than one non-FIFA nationality.

No.	Pos.	Nation	Player
1	GK	MLT	Leon Seisun
2	DF	CRO	Karlo Bručić
4	DF	MLT	Shelom Magri
7	MF	ARG	Nicolas Lancioni
8	MF	TAN	Charles M'Mombwa
10	MF	BRA	João Mafra
11	FW	MLT	Nicholas Agius
16	DF	MLT	Jake Micallef
17	DF	MLT	Jurgen Pisani
18	FW	POR	Luís Mota
19	FW	SSD	Ayom Majok
20	MF	MLT	Liam Micallef
21	DF	SRB	Strahinja Jovančić

No.	Pos.	Nation	Player
22	DF	MLT	Zean Leonardi
23	DF	MLT	Zven Polidano
24	MF	MLT	Timothy Eviparker
28	DF	BRA	Vinícius de Paiva
30	GK	CRO	Patrik Mohorović
32	DF	ARG	Tobías Moriceau
33	FW	BIH	Adnan Bašić
39	FW	BRA	Vinicius Kanu (on loan from AA Maguary)
55	MF	CIV	Pah Franck Gouhon (on loan from Göztepe)
70	MF	MLT	Kaiden Fenech
71	MF	MLT	Thomas Melillo (on loan from Valletta)
89	FW	MLT	Mario Fontanella
91	GK	BRA	Tiago Gomes
—	FW	CRO	Miloš Jovičić

=== Out on loan ===
Note: Flags indicate national team as defined under FIFA eligibility rules; some limited exceptions apply. Players may hold more than one non-FIFA nationality.

No. / Pos. / Nation / Player; — / DF / MLT / Miguel Azzopardi (at Birżebbuġa St. Peter's until 31 December 2026)	No. / Pos. / Nation / Player

=== Other players under contract ===
Note: Flags indicate national team as defined under FIFA eligibility rules; some limited exceptions apply. Players may hold more than one non-FIFA nationality.

No. / Pos. / Nation / Player	No. / Pos. / Nation / Player

== Technical staff ==
Position	Staff
General Manager	(Malta) Cameron Farrugia
Manager	(Italy) Adolfo Sormani
Technical Collaborator	(Italy) Giovanni Mazzella
Assistant manager	Romeu Romao

== Honours ==
- Maltese First Division
  - Winners: 1982–83, 1994–95, 2003–04
- Maltese Second Division
  - Winners: 1949–50, 1959–60, 1981–82, 1988–89
- Maltese Third Division
  - Winners: 1980–81
- National Amateur Cup
  - Winners (1): 2021–22
- Maltese National Amateur League
  - Winners of Promotion Playoffs: 2022–23
- Maltese Challenge League
  - Runners-up: 2023-24
