= Charles Abela Memorial Stadium =

Stadium in Mosta, Malta

- Mosta Ground
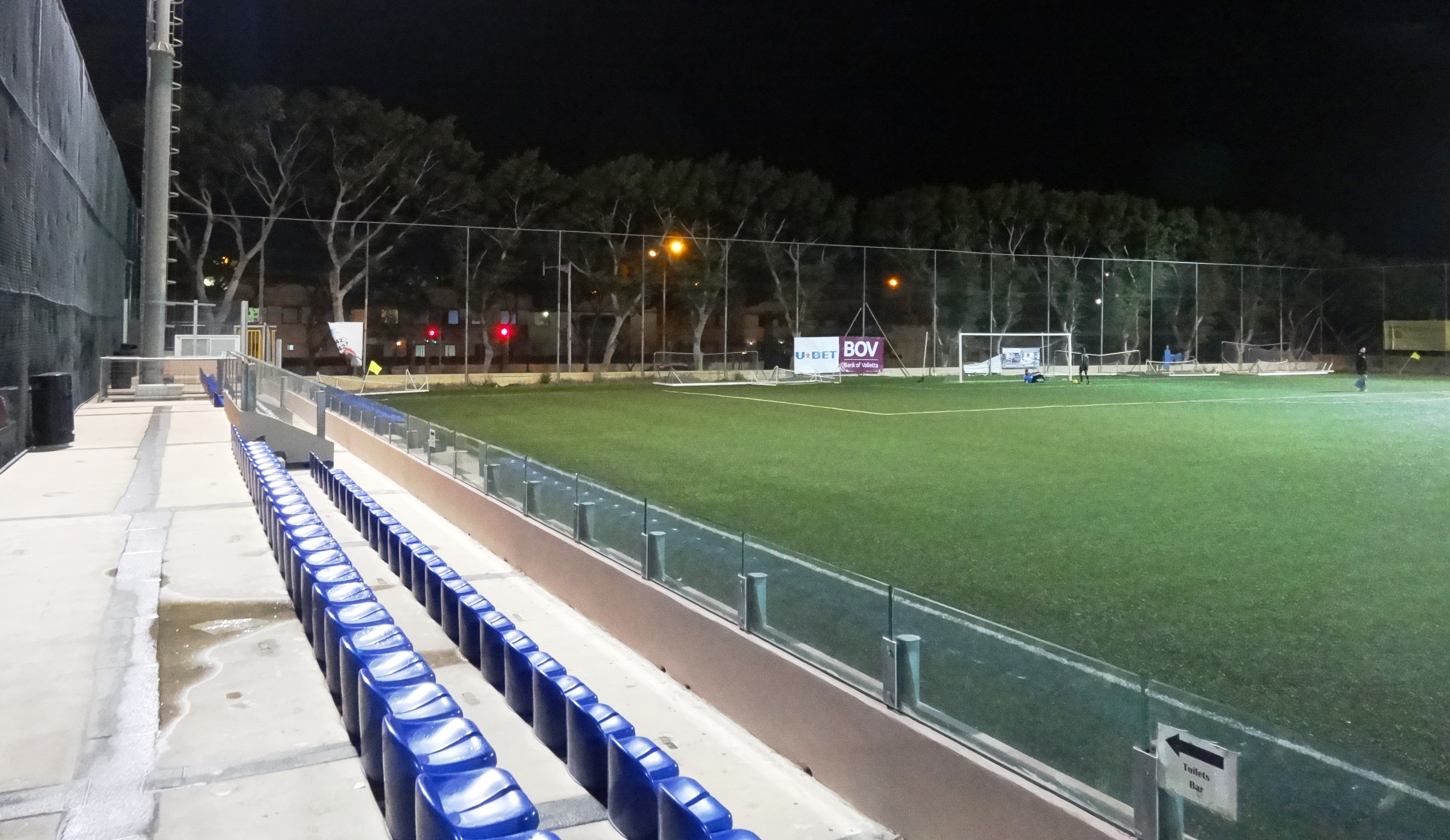
- Interactive map of Charles Abela Memorial Stadium
- Location: Mosta, Malta
- Coordinates: 35°54′17″N 14°26′05″E
- Operator: Mosta
- Capacity: ~700 (360 seats)
- Surface: Artificial turf

Construction
- Opened: 13 November 2010

Tenants
- Mosta F.C. (Not in the Maltese Premier League and Maltese Challenge League); Maltese National Amateur League; Maltese First Division (women)

The Charles Abela Memorial Stadium, also known as the Mosta Ground, is a ground situated in Mosta, Malta. It has a total capacity of 700 with 360 seats. The stadium hosts matches from various competitions, most notably the Maltese Third Division and the Women Maltese First Division.

== Background and description ==
The Charles Abela Memorial Stadium was upgraded and inaugurated by then Prime Minister of Malta, Dr Lawrence Gonzi in November 2010. The stadium is named in honour of the late Charles Abela, who was the president of Mosta FC. The stadium comprises one stand, which runs along the whole side of the pitch.

== Local issues ==
In 2011, neighbours complained that some of the works performed on the stadium were illegal In 2016, a player suffered a concussion during a match played at the stadium and the ambulance could not get into the stadium as the keys to the inner gate could not be retrieved.

== See also ==
- List of football stadiums in Malta
