= 2010–11 Maltese Second and Third Division Knock-Out =

2010–11 Second and Third Division Knock-Out
Tournament details
- Country: Malta
- Dates: 1 September 2010 – 8 May 2011
- Teams: 32

Final positions
- Champions: Żejtun Corinthians
- Runners-up: Rabat Ajax

Tournament statistics
- Matches played: 55
- Goals scored: 150 (2.73 per match)

The 2010–11 Second and Third Division Knock-Out (known as quick Keno Second and Third Division Knock-Out for sponsorship reasons) was a knockout tournament for Maltese football clubs playing in the Second and Third Division. Played between 1 September 2010 and 8 May 2011, Żejtun Corinthians successfully defended last season's title.

== Group stage ==
=== Group 1 ===
Pos	Team	Pld	W	D	L	GF	GA	GD	Pts	Qualification	RBT	MDN	MLĦ	GXQ
1	Rabat Ajax	3	2	1	0	5	2	+3	7	Advance to knockout phase	—	2–1	0–0	2–1
2	Mdina Knights	3	1	1	1	3	3	0	4			—	0–0	2–0
3	Mellieħa	3	0	3	0	2	2	0	3				—	2–2
4	Għaxaq	3	0	1	2	3	6	−3	1					—

Source: MaltaFootball.com

=== Group 2 ===
Pos	Team	Pld	W	D	L	GF	GA	GD	Pts	Qualification	ŻTN	GŻR	GDJ	SLC
1	Żejtun Corinthians	3	3	0	0	6	1	+5	9	Advance to knockout phase	—	2–1	2–0	2–0
2	Gżira United	3	1	1	1	5	3	+2	4			—	4–1	0–0
3	Gudja United	3	1	0	2	3	6	−3	3				—	2–0
4	St. Lucia	3	0	1	2	0	4	−4	1					—

Source: MaltaFootball.com

=== Group 3 ===
Pos	Team	Pld	W	D	L	GF	GA	GD	Pts	Qualification	MĠR	SĠN	MRS	FGR
1	Mġarr United	3	3	0	0	8	2	+6	9	Advance to knockout phase	—	3–1	2–0	3–1
2	San Ġwann	3	1	1	1	5	5	0	4			—	2–2	2–0
3	Marsa	3	0	2	1	4	6	−2	2				—	2–2
4	Fgura United	3	0	1	2	3	7	−4	1					—

Source: MaltaFootball.com

=== Group 4 ===
Pos	Team	Pld	W	D	L	GF	GA	GD	Pts	Qualification	BBĠ	ŻBĠ	SĠW	PBK
1	Birżebbuġa St. Peter's	3	2	0	1	6	4	+2	6	Advance to knockout phase	—	2–0	2–4	2–0
2	Żebbuġ Rangers	3	2	0	1	5	4	+1	6			—	1–0	4–2
3	Siġġiewi	3	1	0	2	5	5	0	3				—	1–2
4	Pembroke Athleta	3	1	0	2	4	7	−3	3					—

Source: MaltaFootball.com

=== Group 5 ===
Pos	Team	Pld	W	D	L	GF	GA	GD	Pts	Qualification	MTF	QRD	ŻRQ	MSK
1	Mtarfa	3	2	1	0	3	0	+3	7	Advance to knockout phase	—	0–0	1–0	2–0
2	Qrendi	3	1	2	0	1	0	+1	5			—	0–0	1–0
3	Żurrieq	3	1	1	1	7	1	+6	4				—	7–0
4	Marsaskala	3	0	0	3	0	10	−10	0					—

Source: MaltaFootball.com

=== Group 6 ===
Pos	Team	Pld	W	D	L	GF	GA	GD	Pts	Qualification	NXR	KKP	XJR	SIR
1	Naxxar Lions	3	2	1	0	8	3	+5	7	Advance to knockout phase	—	3–1	2–2	3–0
2	Kirkop United	3	2	0	1	6	4	+2	6			—	1–0	4–1
3	Xgħajra Tornadoes	3	1	1	1	6	4	+2	4				—	4–1
4	Sirens	3	0	0	3	2	11	−9	0					—

Source: MaltaFootball.com

=== Group 7 ===
Pos	Team	Pld	W	D	L	GF	GA	GD	Pts	Qualification	SVN	SEN	SWQ	GĦR
1	St. Venera Lightnings	3	2	1	0	3	1	+2	7	Advance to knockout phase	—	2–1	0–0	1–0
2	Senglea Athletic	3	2	0	1	6	2	+4	6			—	2–0	3–0
3	Swieqi United	3	0	2	1	2	4	−2	2				—	2–2
4	Għargħur	3	0	1	2	2	6	−4	1					—

Source: MaltaFootball.com

=== Group 8 ===
Pos	Team	Pld	W	D	L	GF	GA	GD	Pts	Qualification	ATD	ŻBR	KKR	LQA
1	Attard	3	3	0	0	7	2	+5	9	Advance to knockout phase	—	2–1	4–1	1–0
2	Żabbar St. Patrick	3	2	0	1	7	2	+5	6			—	2–0	4–0
3	Kalkara	3	1	0	2	4	7	−3	3				—	3–1
4	Luqa St. Andrew's	3	0	0	3	1	8	−7	0					—

Source: MaltaFootball.com

== Knockout phase ==
Quarter-finals
26 December
Żejtun Corinthians	3
Mġarr United	0
26 December
Attard	0
Naxxar Lions	3
26 December
St. Venera Lightnings	2
Mtarfa	0
26 December
Rabat Ajax	3
Birżebbuġa St. Peter's	0

Semi-finals
26 April
Żejtun Corinthians	2
Naxxar Lions	0
27 April
St. Venera Lightnings	1
Rabat Ajax	2

Final
8 May
Żejtun Corinthians	2
Rabat Ajax	0

== See also ==
- 2010–11 Maltese Second Division
- 2010–11 Maltese Third Division
