= 2013–14 Maltese FA Trophy =

Tournament details
- Country: Malta
- Teams: 65

Final positions
- Champions: Valletta (13th title)
- Runners-up: Sliema Wanderers

The 2013–14 Maltese FA Trophy was the 76th season since its establishment. For the second season, the competition included all teams from Malta and Gozo. The competition began on 1 September 2013 and ended on 4 May 2014 with the final in Ta' Qali Stadium. The defending champions were Hibernians, having won their 10th Maltese Cup last season, but were eliminated by Pietà Hotspurs in the fourth round. Valletta were crowned winners after defeating Sliema Wanderers 1–0 in the final, therefore qualifying for the first qualifying round of the 2014–15 UEFA Europa League.

== Calendar ==
Matches began on 1 September 2013 and concluded with the final on 4 May 2014.

Round	Date	Fixtures	New entrants	Venues
Preliminary Round	1 September 2013	1	2	Centenary Stadium
First Round	4–5 September 2013; 7-8 September 2013	12	23	Centenary Stadium; Gozo Stadium; Sannat Ground
Second Round	15–27 October 2013	20	28	Centenary Stadium; Victor Tedesco Stadium; Gozo Stadium; Sirens Stadium; Luxol Stadium
Third Round	22–27 November 2013	16	12	Victor Tedesco Stadium
Fourth Round	17–22 January 2014	8	–	Victor Tedesco Stadium
Quarter-finals	15–16 February 2014	4	–	Ta' Qali National Stadium
Semi-finals	19 March 2014	2	–	Ta' Qali National Stadium
Final	4 May 2014	1	–	Ta' Qali National Stadium

== Preliminary round ==
Entering this round 2 clubs from the Maltese Third Division and Gozo Football League Second Division. These matches took place between 1 September 2013.

Team 1	Score	Team 2
1 September 2013
Attard (4)	2–1	(Gozo) Qala Saints (2G)

== First round ==
In this round a total of 24 teams compete. Matches were played on 4, 5, 7 & 8 September 2013.

Team 1	Score	Team 2
4 September 2013
St. Venera Lightning (4)	1–2 (a.e.t.)	(Gozo) Xagħra United (1G)
Santa Lucia (4)	1–2	Luqa St. Andrew's (4)
5 September 2013
(Gozo) Victoria Hotspurs (1G)	2–1	(Gozo) Munxar Falcons (1G)
(Gozo) Kercem Ajax (1G)	6–2	(Gozo) St. Lawrence Spurs (2G)
7 September 2013
Xghajra Tornadoes (4)	0–2	(Gozo) Victoria Wanderers (1G)
Attard (4)	0–2	Mgarr United (4)
(Gozo) Xewkija Tigers (1G)	4–0	Kalkara (4)
Sirens (4)	10–1	(Gozo) Sannat Lions (2G)
Swieqi United (4)	3–2	Qrendi (4)
(Gozo) Għajnsielem (2G)	1–4	Ta' Xbiex (4)
8 September 2013
(Gozo) Oratory Youths (1G)	1–0	Mtarfa (4)
(Gozo) Nadur Youngsters (1G)	4–2	Ghaxaq (4)

== Second round ==
In this round a total of 40 teams compete. Entering this round were the 12 winners from the First Round along with the 14 Maltese First Division clubs and the 14 Maltese Second Division clubs. Matches were played on 27 October 2013.

Team 1	Score	Team 2
25 October 2013
Birzebbuga St. Peters (2)	1–0	Msida St. Joseph (2)
St. George's (2)	4–3	St. Patrick (3)
Għargħur (3)	1–4	Mellieħa (3)
Zebbug Rangers (2)	3–0	Dingli Swallows (3)
Zejtun Corinthians (2)	1–1 (a.e.t.) (3–4 p)	Gudja United (2)
26 October 2013
(Gozo) Oratory Youths (1G)	0–3	(Gozo) Victoria Hotspurs (1G)
Sirens (4)	1–0	Marsa (3)
Ta' Xbiex (4)	0–6	Pembroke Athleta (3)
Lija Athletic (2)	4–0	(Gozo) Xewkija Tigers (1G)
Swieqi United (4)	2–5	Siggiewi (3)
Mgarr United (4)	0–3	St. Andrews (2)
Senglea Athletic (3)	4–2 (a.e.t.)	Kirkop United (3)
27 October 2013
(Gozo) Kercem Ajax (1G)	2–1	Luqa St. Andrew's (4)
Żurrieq (2)	1–5	Gżira United (2)
Hamrun Spartans (2)	0–1	Pietà Hotspurs (2)
Melita (2)	3–0	(Gozo) Nadur Youngsters (1G)
Fgura United (3)	1–2	Mdina Knights (3)
(Gozo) Xagħra United (1G)	0–1	Mqabba (3)
Marsaskala (3)	0–1	(Gozo) Victoria Wanderers (1G)
Marsaxlokk (4)	0–4	San Gwann (3)

== Third round ==
Entering this round were the 20 winners from the Second Round along with the 12 Maltese Premier League clubs. Matches were played on 27 November 2013.

Team 1	Score	Team 2
24 November 2013
Pembroke Athleta (3)	0−1	Gżira United (2)
Siggiewi (3)	0−6	St. George's (2)
Pietà Hotspurs (2)	1−0	Mqabba (3)
St. Andrews (2)	2−1	San Gwann (3)
26 November 2013
Birzebbuga St. Peters (2)	2−5	Balzan (1)
Mdina Knights (3)	1−5	(Gozo) Kercem Ajax (1G)
Naxxar Lions (1)	3−0	Gudja United (2)
Birkirkara (1)	4–1	Vittoriosa Stars (1)
Hibernians (1)	6−1	Senglea Athletic (3)
Sirens (4)	1−3	Rabat Ajax (1)
27 November 2013
Mellieħa (3)	0–1	Tarxien Rainbows (1)
Sliema Wanderers (1)	3−1	Zebbug Rangers (2)
Melita (2)	1−3	Valletta (1)
Lija Athletic (2)	1−2	Mosta (1)
Qormi (1)	1−0 (a.e.t.)	(Gozo) Victoria Wanderers (1G)
Floriana (1)	4−1	(Gozo) Victoria Hotspurs (1G)

== Fourth round ==
Entering this round were the 16 winners from the Third Round. Matches were played on 18 January 2014.

Team 1	Score	Team 2
19 January 2014
Gżira United (2)	2−1	St. George's (2)
21 January 2014
St. Andrews (2)	0−4	Birkirkara (1)
Qormi (1)	0−0 (a.e.t.) (6–5 p)	Tarxien Rainbows (1)
22 January 2014
(Gozo) Kercem Ajax (1G)	1−5	Rabat Ajax (1)
Hibernians (1)	0−1	Pietà Hotspurs (2)
Sliema Wanderers (1)	1−1 (a.e.t.) (8−7 p)	Balzan (1)
Floriana (1)	0−1	Naxxar Lions (1)
Valletta (1)	3−0	Mosta (1)

== Quarter-finals ==
Entering this round were the 8 winners from the Fourth Round. These matches took place on 15 and 16 February 2014.

15 February 2014	Naxxar Lions (1)	0–1	Valletta (1)	Ta' Qali
14:00 CET		Report	Denni 24'	Stadium: Ta' Qali National Stadium

15 February 2014	Qormi (1)	3–1	Birkirkara (1)	Ta' Qali
16:00 CET	Effiong 31'; Grech 45+2'; Cantoro 90'	Report	Fenech 17'	Stadium: Ta' Qali National Stadium

16 February 2014	Gżira United (2)	2–1	Rabat Ajax (1)	Ta' Qali
14:00 CET	Gueye 51'; Meilak 90+3'	Report	Bajada 5'	Stadium: Ta' Qali National Stadium

16 February 2014	Sliema Wanderers (1)	2–0	Pietà Hotspurs (2)	Ta' Qali
16:00 CET	Scerri 5'; Ohawuchi 14'	Report		Stadium: Ta' Qali National Stadium

== Semi-finals ==
19 March 2014	Gżira United (2)	0–2	Valletta (1)	Ta' Qali
14:00 CET		Report	Agius 24'; Cremona 90'	Stadium: Ta' Qali National Stadium

19 March 2014	Sliema Wanderers (1)	1–0	Qormi (1)	Ta' Qali
16:00 CET	Woods 90'	Report		Stadium: Ta' Qali National Stadium

== Final ==
The final was played on 1 May 2014.

Sliema Wanderers and Valletta met together in the Maltese FA Trophy final five times before, having previously met in 1959, 1964, 1991, 1996 and 2009. When meeting in the finals, Valletta has won it three times, while Sliema Wanderers won it two times.

The last time Valletta and Sliema Wanderers met together in Maltese FA Trophy was during the 2011-12 fourth round when Valletta beat Sliema Wanderers by 5–2.

1 May 2014	Valletta (1)	1–0	Sliema Wanderers (1)	Ta' Qali
17:00 CEST	Elford-Alliyu 2'	Report		Stadium: Ta' Qali National Stadium; Referee: Clayton Pisani
