= 2016–17 Maltese FA Trophy =

Tournament details
- Country: Malta
- Teams: 65

Final positions
- Champions: Floriana (20 Times)
- Runners-up: Sliema Wanderers

The 2016–17 Maltese FA Trophy was the 79th version of the tournament, beginning on 3 September 2016 and ending on 20 May 2017. It was the first time since 1933 that a new Malta Football Association Trophy was unveiled. The new trophy, partly financed by the English Football Association, was presented for the first time to the winners.

With their quarterfinal victory over Pembroke Athleta, the Victoria Wanderers became the first club from Gozo to advance to the semifinals.

The Sliema Wanderers were the defending champions, but they lost in the final to Floriana.

== Format ==
The Maltese FA Trophy was a single elimination tournament between 65 teams. The winner of the tournament, Floriana, earned a place in the Europa League. Matches which were tied after regulation went to extra time and if still tied after that, to penalties to determine a winner.

== Schedule ==
| Round | Date(s) | Number of fixtures | Clubs |
|---|---|---|---|
| Preliminary round | 3 September 2016 | 1 | 65 → 64 |
| First round | 9–11 September 2016 | 12 | 64 → 52 |
| Second round | 21–23 October 2016 | 20 | 52 → 32 |
| Third round | 29 November – 14 December 2016 | 16 | 32 → 16 |
| Fourth round | 17–18 January 2017 | 8 | 16 → 8 |
| Quarterfinals | 18–19 February 2017 | 4 | 8 → 4 |
| Semifinals | 13 May 2017 | 2 | 4 → 2 |
| Final | 20 May 2017 | 1 | 2 → 1 |

== Preliminary round ==
The draw for the preliminary, first, and second rounds was held 17 August 2016.

| 3 September 2016 | Xghajra Tornadoes (4) | 1–2 | Għarb Rangers (Gozo) (2) | Ta' Qali |
| 15:00 CEST | Glenn Bonello 73' (pen.) | | Frank Attard 77'; Glenn Saliba 83' (o.g.) | Stadium: Centenary Stadium; Referee: Patrick Mangion |

== First round ==
Twelve first round matches were played 9–11 September 2016.

| Team 1 | Score | Team 2 |
|---|---|---|
9 September 2016
| Kalkara (4) | 2–3 | (Gozo) Għajnsielem (1G) |
| Msida St. Joseph (4) | 1–0 | Luqa St. Andrew's (4) |
| Nadur Youngsters (1G) (Gozo) | 7–1 | (Gozo) Għarb Rangers (2G) |
10 September 2016
| Kirkop United (4) | 4–0 | Marsaskala (4) |
| Mdina Knights (4) | 1–5 | (Gozo) Victoria Hotspurs (1G) |
| Mtarfa (4) | 0–7 | (Gozo) Xagħra United (1G) |
| Ta' Xbiex (4) | 0–2 | (Gozo) Munxar Falcons (2G) |
| St. Lawrence Spurs (2G) (Gozo) | 3–0 | Żurrieq (4) |
11 September 2016
| Oratory Youths (1G) (Gozo) | 5–0 | Dingli Swallows (4) |
| St. Lucia (4) | 0–3 | (Gozo) Kerċem Ajax (1G) |
| Qala Saints (2G) (Gozo) | 0–6 | (Gozo) Xewkija Tigers (1G) |
| St. Venera Lightnings (4) | 0–3 | (Gozo) Victoria Wanderers (1G) |

== Second round ==
Twenty second round matches were played 21–23 October 2016. All teams from Maltese First Division and Maltese Second Division entered the second round.

| Team 1 | Score | Team 2 |
|---|---|---|
21 October 2016
| Marsaxlokk (3) | 0–4 | San Ġwann (3) |
| Munxar Falcons (2G) (Gozo) | 0–8 | Għargħur (2) |
| Mellieħa (3) | 2–2 (a.e.t.) (3–5 p) | Birżebbuġa (3) |
| Żebbuġ Rangers (2) | 2–0 | Fgura United (2) |
22 October 2016
| Kirkop United (4) | 0–1 | Pietà Hotspurs (2) |
| Attard (3) | 1–5 | Vittoriosa Stars (2) |
| Mġarr United (3) | 2–1 | Żabbar St. Patrick (3) |
| Qrendi (3) | 2–1 | Oratory Youths (1G) (Gozo) |
| Rabat Ajax (2) | 1–2 | Sirens (2) |
| St. George's F.C. (3) | 2–3 (a.e.t.) | Siggiewi (3) |
| Ghaxaq (3) | 0–4 | (Gozo) Nadur Youngsters (1G) |
| Swieqi United (3) | 3–0 | Gudja United (3) |
23 October 2016
| Msida St. Joseph (4) | 0–1 | Mqabba F.C. (2) |
| Qormi (2) | 1–4 | (Gozo) Xewkija Tigers (1G) |
| Melita (2) | 1–2 | (Gozo) Victoria Wanderers (1G) |
| Kerċem Ajax (1G) (Gozo) | 3–3 (a.e.t.) (4–5 p) | Marsa (2) |
| Lija Athletic (2) | 5–0 | (Gozo) St. Lawrence Spurs (2G) |
| Senglea Athletic (2) | 7–1 | (Gozo) Xagħra United (1G) |
| Naxxar Lions (2) | 1–4 | (Gozo) Għajnsielem (1G) |
| Victoria Hotspurs (1G) (Gozo) | 1–1 (a.e.t.) (4–3 p) | Zejtun (3) |

== Third round ==
Sixteen third round matches were played between 29 November – 14 December 2016. The draw for the third and fourth rounds was held 25 October 2016. All teams from Maltese Premier League entered the third round.

| Team 1 | Score | Team 2 |
|---|---|---|
29 November 2016
| St. Andrews (1) | 3–0 | Birkirkara (1) |
| Senglea Athletic (2) | 3–2 (a.e.t.) | Hibernians (1) |
30 November 2016
| Marsa (2) | 3–2 (a.e.t.) | (Gozo) Xewkija Tigers (1G) |
| Sliema Wanderers (1) | 3–2 | Mosta (1) |
| Pietà Hotspurs (2) | 0–2 | Lija Athletic (2) |
7 December 2016
| Victoria Hotspurs (1G) (Gozo) | 2–3 | (Gozo) Għajnsielem (1G) |
13 December 2016
| Għargħur (2) | 0–6 | Tarxien Rainbows (1) |
| Floriana (1) | 5–0 | Birżebbuġa (3) |
| Swieqi United (3) | 0–1 | Qrendi (3) |
| Siggiewi (3) | 0–2 | Mqabba F.C. (2) |
14 December 2016
| Valletta (1) | 1–0 | San Ġwann (3) |
| Balzan (1) | 3–1 | Żebbuġ Rangers (2) |
| Vittoriosa Stars (2) | 3–2 | Gżira United (1) |
| Sirens (2) | 1–2 | Pembroke Athleta (1) |
| Victoria Wanderers (1G) (Gozo) | 5–0 | Mġarr United (3) |
| Nadur Youngsters (1G) (Gozo) | 0–2 | Hamrun Spartans (1) |

== Fourth round ==
Eight fourth round matches were played 17–18 January 2017.

| 17 January 2017 | Lija Athletic (2) | 0–3 | Tarxien Rainbows (1) | Ħamrun |
| 18:00 CEST | | | Alexander Nilsson 8', 30'; Julian Galea 74' | Stadium: Victor Tedesco Stadium; Referee: Etienne Antoine Mangion |

| 17 January 2017 | Vittoriosa Stars (2) | 1–2 (a.e.t.) | Senglea Athletic (2) | Ħamrun |
| 20:15 CEST | Andreas Galea 74' | | James Augustin Obaje 37'; Terence Vella 101' | Stadium: Victor Tedesco Stadium; Referee: Trustin Farrugia Cann |

| 18 January 2017 | Floriana (1) | 4–1 | Għajnsielem (Gozo) (1) | Ta' Qali |
| 18:00 CEST | Ryan Camenzuli 4'; Steve Pisani 36'; Mario Fontanella 63' (pen.); Nicolas Chiesa 83' | | Demba Toure 77' (pen.) | Stadium: Ta' Qali National Stadium; Referee: Stefan Pace |

| 18 January 2017 | Sliema Wanderers (1) | 5–0 | Qrendi (3) | Ħamrun |
| 18:00 CEST | Denni Dos Santos 32'; Jean Paul Farrugia 45'; Ryan Spiteri 54'; Peter Xuereb 69', 89' | | | Stadium: Victor Tedesco Stadium; Referee: Glen Tonna |

| 18 January 2017 | Victoria Wanderers (Gozo) (1) | 1–0 | St. Andrews (1) | Xewkija |
| 18:00 CEST | Predrag Djordjevic 85' | | | Stadium: Gozo Stadium; Referee: Philipp Farrugia |

| 18 January 2017 | Marsa (2) | 1–2 | Pembroke Athleta (1) | Ta' Qali |
| 19:00 CEST | Luis Andre De Melo 43' (pen.) | | Stevan Raccic 59', 74' | Stadium: Centenary Stadium; Referee: Malcolm Spiteri |

| 18 January 2017 | Balzan (2) | 1–0 | Valletta (1) | Ta' Qali |
| 20:00 CEST | Alfred Effiong 90+1' | | | Stadium: Ta' Qali National Stadium; Referee: Mario Apap |

| 18 January 2017 | Hamrun Spartans (2) | 1–0 | Mqabba (2) | Ħamrun |
| 20:15 CEST | Saturday Nanapere 79' | | | Stadium: Victor Tedesco Stadium; Referee: Clayton Pisani |

== Quarterfinals ==
Four quarterfinal matches were played 18–19 February 2017. The draw for the quarterfinals was held 20 January 2017.

| 18 February 2017 | Senglea Athletic (2) | 0–0 (a.e.t.) (2–3 p) | Sliema Wanderers (1) | Paola |
| 14:00 CEST | | | | Stadium: Hibernians Stadium; Referee: Matthew De Gabrielle |

| 19 February 2017 | Balzan (1) | 1–2 (a.e.t.) | Tarxien Rainbows (1) | Ta' Qali |
| 14:00 CEST | Baker Ebiabowei 43' (o.g.) | | Triston Caruana 51' (pen.); Samir Arab 114' (o.g.) | Stadium: Ta'Qali National Stadium; Referee: Trustin Cann Farrugia |

| 19 February 2017 | Victoria Wanderers (Gozo) (1) | 2–0 | Pembroke Athleta (1) | Gozo |
| 15:00 CEST | Miguel Attard 28' (o.g.); Predrag Djordjevic 49' | | | Stadium: Gozo Stadium; Referee: Emanuel Grech |

| 19 February 2017 | Floriana (1) | 2–0 | Hamrun Spartans (1) | Ta' Qali |
| 17:15 CEST | Vella 21'; Pepe 25' | | | Stadium: Ta'Qali National Stadium; Referee: Mario Apap |

== Semifinals ==
Two semifinal matches were played 13 May 2017. The draw for the semifinals was held on 8 May 2017.

Victoria Wanderers become the first football club in Gozo to reach the semifinals of Maltese FA Trophy.

| 13 May 2017 | Victoria Wanderers (Gozo) (1) | 1–3 | Floriana (1) | Xewkija |
| 17:00 CEST | Giarrizzo 45+2' | | Pisani 23', 71' (pen.); Vella 53' | Stadium: Gozo Stadium; Referee: Clayton Pisani |

| 13 May 2017 | Tarxien Rainbows (1) | 0–3 | Sliema Wanderers (1) | Ta' Qali |
| 17:00 CEST | | | Mateus 23'; Leonardo Incorvaia 38'; Mark Scerri 63' | Stadium: Ta' Qali National Stadium; Referee: Malcolm Spiteri |

== Final ==
The final was played 20 May 2017.

Floriana and Sliema Wanderers met in the final for the fifteenth time, having previously met in 1935, 1936, 1938, 1945, 1949, 1953, 1955, 1956, 1958, 1965, 1972, 1974, 1979 and 1993. Floriana had won eight times and Sliema Wanderers six times.

The last time Floriana and Sliema Wanderers met together in Maltese FA Trophy was during the 2014-15 Third round when Floriana beat Sliema Wanderers 5–4 on penalties when the match ends 0–0 draw.

| 20 May 2017 | Floriana (1) | 2–0 | Sliema Wanderers (1) | Ta' Qali |
| 17:00 CEST | Enzo Adrian Ruiz 4'; Borg 90+3' | | | Stadium: Ta' Qali National Stadium; Attendance: 3750; Referee: Glen Tonna |

== See also ==
2016–17 Maltese Premier League
