= 2008–09 Maltese Second and Third Division Knock-Out =

2008–09 Second and Third Division Knock-Out
Tournament details
- Country: Malta
- Dates: 3 September 2008 – 29 May 2009
- Teams: 31

Final positions
- Champions: Melita
- Runners-up: St. Venera Lightnings

Tournament statistics
- Matches played: 52
- Goals scored: 163 (3.13 per match)

The 2008–09 Second and Third Division Knock-Out (known as quick Keno Second and Third Division Knock-Out for sponsorship reasons) was a knockout tournament for Maltese football clubs playing in the Second and Third Division. The winners were Melita which successfully defended this title from their win in the previous season.

== Group stage ==
=== Group 1 ===
Pos	Team	Pld	W	D	L	GF	GA	GD	Pts	Qualification	MĠR	PBK	STA	LQA
1	Mġarr United	3	2	0	1	8	5	+3	6	Advance to knockout phase	—	0–1	3–2	5–2
2	Pembroke Athleta	3	2	0	1	7	4	+3	6			—	3–4	3–0
3	St. Andrews	3	1	1	1	6	6	0	4				—	0–0
4	Luqa St. Andrew's	3	0	1	2	2	8	−6	1					—

Source: MaltaFootball.com

=== Group 2 ===
Pos	Team	Pld	W	D	L	GF	GA	GD	Pts	Qualification	ŻBĠ	BBĠ	MTF	QRD
1	Żebbuġ Rangers	3	3	0	0	12	4	+8	9	Advance to knockout phase	—	3–1	4–1	5–2
2	Birżebbuġa St. Peter's	3	2	0	1	12	3	+9	6			—	3–0	8–0
3	Mtarfa	3	1	0	2	3	8	−5	3				—	2–1
4	Qrendi	3	0	0	3	3	15	−12	0					—

Source: MaltaFootball.com

=== Group 3 ===
Pos	Team	Pld	W	D	L	GF	GA	GD	Pts	Qualification	BZN	MRS	ATD	XJR
1	Balzan Youths	3	3	0	0	10	0	+10	9	Advance to knockout phase	—	6–0	2–0	2–0
2	Marsa	3	2	0	1	3	7	−4	6			—	2–1	1–0
3	Attard	3	0	1	2	2	5	−3	1				—	1–1
4	Xgħajra Tornadoes	3	0	1	2	1	4	−3	1					—

Source: MaltaFootball.com

=== Group 4 ===
Pos	Team	Pld	W	D	L	GF	GA	GD	Pts	Qualification	SVN	GĦR	GOZ	ŻTN
1	St. Venera Lightnings	3	2	1	0	7	2	+5	7	Advance to knockout phase	—	3–1	1–1	3–0
2	Għargħur	3	1	1	1	5	5	0	4			—	3–1	1–1
3	Gozo	3	1	1	1	4	4	0	4				—	2–0
4	Żejtun Corinthians	3	0	1	2	1	6	−5	1					—

Source: MaltaFootball.com

=== Group 5 ===
Pos	Team	Pld	W	D	L	GF	GA	GD	Pts	Qualification	NXR	MDN	KKR	ŻRQ
1	Naxxar Lions	3	3	0	0	5	2	+3	9	Advance to knockout phase	—	2–1	1–0	2–1
2	Mdina Knights	3	1	1	1	3	2	+1	4			—	0–0	2–0
3	Kalkara	3	1	1	1	1	1	0	4				—	1–0
4	Żurrieq	3	0	0	3	1	5	−4	0					—

Source: MaltaFootball.com

=== Group 6 ===
Pos	Team	Pld	W	D	L	GF	GA	GD	Pts	Qualification	MEL	GŻR	SIR	FGR
1	Melita	3	2	1	0	6	1	+5	7	Advance to knockout phase	—	3–0	1–1	2–0
2	Gżira United	3	1	1	1	3	3	0	4			—	3–0	0–0
3	Sirens	3	1	1	1	4	5	−1	4				—	1–3
4	Fgura United	3	0	1	2	1	5	−4	1					—

Source: MaltaFootball.com

=== Group 7 ===
Pos	Team	Pld	W	D	L	GF	GA	GD	Pts	Qualification	KKP	MLĦ	SLC	GXQ
1	Kirkop United	3	2	1	0	3	0	+3	7	Advance to knockout phase	—	0–0	1–0	2–0
2	Mellieħa	3	1	2	0	2	0	+2	5			—	0–0	2–0
3	St. Lucia	3	1	1	1	3	1	+2	4				—	3–0
4	Għaxaq	3	0	0	3	0	7	−7	0					—

Source: MaltaFootball.com

=== Group 8 ===
Pos	Team	Pld	W	D	L	GF	GA	GD	Pts	Qualification	GDJ	LJA	SĠW
1	Gudja United	2	2	0	0	7	3	+4	6	Advance to knockout phase	—	2–1	5–2
2	Lija Athletic	2	1	0	1	8	3	+5	3			—	7–1
3	Siġġiewi	2	0	0	2	3	12	−9	0				—

Source: MaltaFootball.com

== Knockout phase ==
Quarter-finals
28 December
Kirkop United	1
Naxxar Lions (a.e.t.)	3
27 December
Żebbuġ Rangers	0
St. Venera Lightnings	1
27 December
Gudja United	1
Melita	9
28 December
Mġarr United	1
Balzan Youths	4

Semi-finals
11 April
Naxxar Lions	0
St. Venera Lightnings	2
11 April
Melita	2
Balzan Youths	0

Final
29 May
St. Venera Lightnings	0
Melita	3

== See also ==
- 2008–09 Maltese Second Division
- 2008–09 Maltese Third Division
