= 2011–12 Maltese FA Trophy =

Tournament details
- Country: Malta

Final positions
- Champions: Hibernians (9th title)
- Runners-up: Qormi

The 2011–12 Maltese FA Trophy was the 74th season since its establishment. In a change from last season, this year's competition will include all teams from Malta and Gozo. The competition began on 8 September 2011 and will ended 27 May 2012 with the Final in Ta' Qali Stadium. The defending champions are Floriana, having won their 19th Maltese Cup last season and first since 1994. The winner will qualify to the first qualifying round of the 2012–13 UEFA Europa League.

Floriana were the defending champions, but were eliminated in the quarter-finals by Hibernians.

== Calendar ==
Matches began on 8 September 2011 and concluded with the final on 27 May 2012.

| Round | Date | Fixtures | New entrants | Venue |
|---|---|---|---|---|
| First Round | 8–11 September 2011 | 11 | 22 | Centenary Stadium; Gozo Stadium; Luxol Stadium |
| Second Round | 12–20 November 2011 | 20 | 29 | Victor Tedesco Stadium; Hibernians Ground; Centenary Stadium |
| Third Round | 16–18 December 2011 | 16 | 12 | Ta' Qali National Stadium; Hibernians Ground |
| Fourth Round | 21–22 January 2012 | 8 | – | Ta' Qali National Stadium; Hibernians Ground |
| Quarterfinals | 25–26 February 2012 | 4 | – | Ta' Qali National Stadium; Hibernians Ground |
| Semifinals | 19–20 May 2012 | 2 | – | Ta' Qali National Stadium |
| Final | 27 May 2012 | 1 | – | Ta' Qali National Stadium |

== First round ==
Entering this round were 12 clubs from the Maltese Third Division, 6 clubs from the Gozo Football League First Division and 4 clubs from the Gozo Football League Second Division. These matches took place between 8 and 11 September 2011.

| Team 1 | Score | Team 2 |
|---|---|---|
8 September 2011
| Mtarfa (IV) | 1–0 | Xghajra Tornadoes (IV) |
| Swieqi United (IV) | 0–5 | (Gozo) Xewkija Tigers (I) |
| Mdina Knights (IV) | 8–1 | (Gozo) Għarb Rangers (II) |
| Mgarr United (IV) | 4–2 (a.e.t.) | (Gozo) Oratory Youths (II) |
10 September 2011
| (Gozo) S.K. Victoria Wanderers (I) | 2–0 | (Gozo) St. Lawrence Spurs (II) |
| (Gozo) Xagħra United (I) | 2–1 | Kalkara (IV) |
| Marsa (IV) | 1–2 | Fgura United (IV) |
| (Gozo) Sannat Lions (I) | 4–1 | Sirens (IV) |
11 September 2011
| Qrendi (IV) | 2–1 | (Gozo) Għajnsielem (I) |
| Ghaxaq (IV) | 1–2 | Pembroke Athleta (IV) |
| (Gozo) Kerċem Ajax (II) | 0–1 | (Gozo) Nadur Youngsters (I) |

== Second round ==
Entering this round were the 11 winners from the First Round along with the 12 Maltese First Division clubs, the 14 Maltese Second Division clubs, 2 clubs from the Maltese Third Division and 1 club from the Gozo Football League First Division. These matches took place between 12 and 20 November 2011.

| Team 1 | Score | Team 2 |
|---|---|---|
12 November 2011
| Lija Athletic (II) | 2−2 (a.e.t.) (5–4 p) | St. Andrews (II) |
| San Gwann (III) | 2−1 | St. Venera Lightning (III) |
| Gżira United (III) | 0−0 (a.e.t.) (4–3 p) | (Gozo) S.K. Victoria Wanderers (I) |
| (Gozo) Xewkija Tigers (I) | 2–1 | Mdina Knights (IV) |
| (Gozo) Sannat Lions (I) | 1–2 | Għargħur (III) |
| Mellieħa (III) | 0−0 (a.e.t.) (4–2 p) | Melita (II) |
13 November 2011
| Attard (III) | 1–3 | Vittoriosa Stars (II) |
| (Gozo) Nadur Youngsters (I) | 1–2 | (Gozo) Victoria Hotspurs (I) |
| St. Patrick (II) | 1–0 | Marsaskala (IV) |
| Dingli Swallows (II) | 5–1 | Qrendi (IV) |
| (Gozo) Xagħra United (I) | 0–1 | Siggiewi (III) |
| Luqa St. Andrew's (III) | 2−2 (a.e.t.) (4–2 p) | Żurrieq (III) |
19 November 2011
| Mtarfa (IV) | 0–5 | St. George's (II) |
| Pietà Hotspurs (II) | 5–1 | St. Lucia (IV) |
| Zejtun Corinthians (II) | 3–0 | Mgarr United (IV) |
| Rabat Ajax (II) | 3–1 | Birzebbuga St. Peters (II) |
20 November 2011
| Senglea Athletic (III) | 6–0 | Zebbug Rangers (III) |
| Fgura United (IV) | 2–3 | Msida St. Joseph (III) |
| Kirkop United (III) | 3–1 | Naxxar Lions (II) |
| Gudja United (III) | 1−2 (a.e.t.) | Pembroke Athleta (IV) |

== Third round ==
Entering this round were the 20 winners from the Second Round and the 12 clubs from the Maltese Premier League. These matches took place between 16 and 18 December 2011.

| Team 1 | Score | Team 2 |
|---|---|---|
16 December 2011
| Ħamrun Spartans | 3–1 | Dingli Swallows (II) |
| Mellieħa (III) | 0−0 (a.e.t.) (4–3 p) | Siggiewi (III) |
17 December 2011
| San Gwann (III) | 3–5 | Marsaxlokk |
| Hibernians | 5–3 | Pembroke Athleta (IV) |
| Kirkop United (III) | 0–3 | Rabat Ajax (II) |
| Zejtun Corinthians (II) | 1–2 | Balzan Youths |
| Għargħur (III) | 0–2 | St. George's (II) |
| Gżira United (III) | 0–1 | Qormi |
18 December 2011
| Luqa St. Andrew's (III) | 1–6 | Floriana |
| Tarxien Rainbows | 0–3 | Pietà Hotspurs (II) |
| St. Patrick (II) | 0–2 | Valletta |
| Birkirkara | 4–0 | Vittoriosa Stars (II) |
| (Gozo) Xewkija Tigers (I) | 3–0 | Senglea Athletic (III) |
| Msida St. Joseph (III) | 0–1 | Mosta |
| Mqabba | 2–4 | Sliema Wanderers |
| Lija Athletic (II) | 6–0 | (Gozo) Victoria Hotspurs (I) |

== Fourth round ==
Entering this round were the 16 winners from the Third Round. These matches took place between 21 and 22 January 2012.

| Team 1 | Score | Team 2 |
|---|---|---|
21 January 2012
| Marsaxlokk | 1–5 | Pietà Hotspurs (II) |
| Mellieħa (III) | 0–5 | Qormi |
| Sliema Wanderers | 2–5 | Valletta |
| Balzan Youths | 0–1 | Floriana |
22 January 2012
| Mosta | 3–1 | (Gozo) Xewkija Tigers (I) |
| St. George's (II) | 1–1 (a.e.t.) (5–4 p) | Lija Athletic (II) |
| Birkirkara | 2–3 | Ħamrun Spartans |
| Rabat Ajax (II) | 0–5 | Hibernians |

== Quarter-finals ==
Entering this round were the eight winners from the Fourth Round.

| 25 February 2012 | Pietà Hotspurs (II) | 0−1 | Qormi | Ta' Qali |
| 14:00 CET | | | Suguino 120' | Stadium: Ta' Qali National Stadium; Referee: Lautier |

| 25 February 2012 | Hibernians | 1−0 | Floriana | Ta' Qali |
| 16:00 CET | Failla 86' | | | Stadium: Ta' Qali National Stadium; Referee: Borg |

| 26 February 2012 | Ħamrun Spartans | 3−1 | St. George's (II) | Paola |
| 14:00 CET | Anderson Ribeiro 20'; Hartvig 41'; Spiteri 90' | | Bonelo 72' | Stadium: Hibernians Ground; Referee: Apap |

| 26 February 2012 | Valletta | 3−1 | Mosta | Paola |
| 16:00 CET | Čekulajevs 3', 72'; Mifsud 27' (pen.) | | Obiefule 43' | Stadium: Hibernians Ground; Referee: Sant |

== Semi-finals ==
Entering this round were the four winners from the Quarterfinals.

| 20 May 2012 | Qormi | 4–3 | Valletta | Ta' Qali |
| 18:00 CET | J. Farrugia 7'; Jorginho 44', 58', 89' | | Denni 8', 79' (pen.); Scerri 33' | Stadium: Ta' Qali National Stadium |

| 21 May 2012 | Hibernians | 2–1 | Ħamrun Spartans | Ta' Qali |
| 19:30 CET | R. Soares 30'; S. Pisani 73' | | D. Shields 82' (pen.) | Stadium: Ta' Qali National Stadium |

== Final ==
The final was played on 27 May 2012.

Qormi and Hibernians never meet in the final. For Qormi this was their first-ever Maltese FA Trophy final in history, while for Hibernians this was the nineteen final, and they won it eight times.

The last time Qormi and Hibernians met together in Maltese FA Trophy was during the 2009-10 Quarter-finals when Qormi beat Hibernians 4–3 on penalties when the match ends 1–1 draw.

| 27 May 2012 | Qormi | 1–3 | Hibernians | Ta' Qali |
| 18:00 CEST | J. Farrugia 90+5' | Report | Clayton Failla 36' (pen.); Jackson 43', 47' | Stadium: Ta' Qali National Stadium; Attendance: 6,996; Referee: Marco Borg |
