= 2007–08 Maltese Second and Third Division Knock-Out =

2007–08 Second and Third Division Knock-Out
Tournament details
- Country: Malta
- Dates: 1 September 2007 – 24 May 2008
- Teams: 30

Final positions
- Champions: Melita
- Runners-up: Balzan Youths

Tournament statistics
- Matches played: 49
- Goals scored: 149 (3.04 per match)

The 2007–08 Second and Third Division Knock-Out (known as quick Keno Second and Third Division Knock-Out for sponsorship reasons) was a knockout tournament for Maltese football clubs playing in the Second and Third Division. The final was contested by defending champions, Balzan Youths and Melita, the latter winning 5–1.

== Group stage ==
=== Group 1 ===
Pos	Team	Pld	W	D	L	GF	GA	GD	Pts	Qualification	MLT	STA	MTF	KKP
1	Melita	3	3	0	0	19	2	+17	9	Advance to knockout phase	—	1–0	10–2	8–0
2	St. Andrews	3	1	1	1	5	4	+1	4			—	1–1	4–2
3	Mtarfa	3	0	2	1	4	12	−8	2				—	1–1
4	Kirkop United	3	0	2	1	3	13	−10	2					—

Source: MaltaFootball.com

=== Group 2 ===
Pos	Team	Pld	W	D	L	GF	GA	GD	Pts	Qualification	MĠR	NXR	MDN	LQA
1	Mġarr United	3	3	0	0	4	1	+3	9	Advance to knockout phase	—	1–0	2–1	1–0
2	Naxxar Lions	3	2	0	1	8	2	+6	6			—	5–0	3–1
3	Mdina Knights	3	1	0	2	4	7	−3	3				—	3–0
4	Luqa St. Andrew's	3	0	0	3	1	7	−6	0					—

Source: MaltaFootball.com

=== Group 3 ===
Pos	Team	Pld	W	D	L	GF	GA	GD	Pts	Qualification	RBT	BBĠ	FGR	GŻR
1	Rabat Ajax	3	2	1	0	7	3	+4	7	Advance to knockout phase	—	1–1	4–1	2–1
2	Birżebbuġa St. Peter's	3	1	2	0	3	2	+1	5			—	0–0	2–1
3	Fgura United	3	1	1	1	2	4	−2	4				—	1–0
4	Gżira United	3	0	0	3	2	5	−3	0					—

Source: MaltaFootball.com

=== Group 4 ===
Pos	Team	Pld	W	D	L	GF	GA	GD	Pts	Qualification	BZN	SĠW	ATD	GDJ
1	Balzan Youths	3	2	1	0	3	0	+3	7	Advance to knockout phase	—	0–0	2–0	1–0
2	San Ġwann	3	1	1	1	2	1	+1	4			—	0–1	2–0
3	Attard	3	1	1	1	2	3	−1	4				—	1–1
4	Gudja United	3	0	1	2	1	4	−3	1					—

Source: MaltaFootball.com

=== Group 5 ===
Pos	Team	Pld	W	D	L	GF	GA	GD	Pts	Qualification	GXQ	LJA	ŻBĠ	SLC
1	Għaxaq	3	2	1	0	10	1	+9	7	Advance to knockout phase	—	3–0	1–1	6–0
2	Lija Athletic	3	1	1	1	7	5	+2	4			—	1–1	6–1
3	Żebbuġ Rangers	3	0	3	0	3	3	0	3				—	1–1
4	St. Lucia	3	0	1	2	2	13	−11	1					—

Source: MaltaFootball.com

=== Group 6 ===
Pos	Team	Pld	W	D	L	GF	GA	GD	Pts	Qualification	ŻRQ	SĠW	GĦR	ŻTN
1	Żurrieq	3	2	1	0	7	4	+3	7	Advance to knockout phase	—	4–2	2–1	1–1
2	Siġġiewi	3	2	0	1	7	6	+1	6			—	3–1	2–1
3	Għargħur	3	1	0	2	4	5	−1	3				—	2–0
4	Żejtun Corinthians	3	0	1	2	2	5	−3	1					—

Source: MaltaFootball.com

=== Group 7 ===
Pos	Team	Pld	W	D	L	GF	GA	GD	Pts	Qualification	SVN	QRD	KKR
1	St. Venera Lightnings	2	1	1	0	9	0	+9	4	Advance to knockout phase	—	0–0	9–0
2	Qrendi	2	1	1	0	2	1	+1	4			—	2–1
3	Kalkara	2	0	0	2	1	11	−10	0				—

Source: MaltaFootball.com

=== Group 8 ===
Pos	Team	Pld	W	D	L	GF	GA	GD	Pts	Qualification	XJR	SIR	PBK
1	Xgħajra Tornadoes	2	1	1	0	2	1	+1	4	Advance to knockout phase	—	0–0	2–1
2	Sirens	2	0	2	0	2	2	0	2			—	2–2
3	Pembroke Athleta	2	0	1	1	3	4	−1	1				—

Source: MaltaFootball.com

== Knockout phase ==
Quarter-finals
29 December
Rabat Ajax	1
Xgħajra Tornadoes	0
29 December
Melita (a.e.t.)	3
Żurrieq	0
30 December
Għaxaq	1 (3)
Balzan Youths (pen.)	1 (5)
30 December
Mġarr United	1
St. Venera Lightnings	0

Semi-finals
23 March
Rabat Ajax	0
Melita	1
23 March
Balzan Youths	4
Mġarr United	0

Final
24 May
Melita	5
Balzan Youths	1

== See also ==
- 2007–08 Maltese Second Division
- 2007–08 Maltese Third Division
