= 2009–10 Maltese Second and Third Division Knock-Out =

2009–10 Second and Third Division Knock-Out
Tournament details
- Country: Malta
- Dates: 31 August 2009 – 22 May 2010
- Teams: 31

Final positions
- Champions: Żejtun Corinthians
- Runners-up: Għargħur

Tournament statistics
- Matches played: 52
- Goals scored: 179 (3.44 per match)

The 2009–10 Second and Third Division Knock-Out (known as quick Keno Second and Third Division Knock-Out for sponsorship reasons) was a knockout tournament for Maltese football clubs playing in the Second and Third Division. The competition was held between 31 August 2009 and 22 May 2010, with the winners being Third Division side Żejtun Corinthians.

== Group stage ==
=== Group 1 ===
Pos	Team	Pld	W	D	L	GF	GA	GD	Pts	Qualification	ŻBĠ	GDJ	GŻR	SWQ
1	Żebbuġ Rangers	3	2	1	0	13	0	+13	7	Advance to knockout phase	—	3–0	0–0	10–0
2	Gudja United	3	1	1	1	7	3	+4	4			—	0–0	7–0
3	Gżira United	3	0	3	0	3	3	0	3				—	3–3
4	Swieqi United	3	0	1	2	3	20	−17	1					—

Source: MaltaFootball.com

=== Group 2 ===
Pos	Team	Pld	W	D	L	GF	GA	GD	Pts	Qualification	LJA	RBT	ATD	MTF
1	Lija Athletic	3	2	1	0	9	2	+7	7	Advance to knockout phase	—	2–2	2–0	5–0
2	Rabat Ajax	3	2	1	0	8	3	+5	7			—	2–0	4–1
3	Attard	3	1	0	2	2	4	−2	3				—	2–0
4	Mtarfa	3	0	0	3	1	11	−10	0					—

Source: MaltaFootball.com

=== Group 3 ===
Pos	Team	Pld	W	D	L	GF	GA	GD	Pts	Qualification	SNG	STA	PBK	SĠW
1	Senglea Athletic	3	2	1	0	8	3	+5	7	Advance to knockout phase	—	1–1	1–0	6–2
2	St. Andrews	3	2	1	0	5	2	+3	7			—	2–1	2–0
3	Pembroke Athleta	3	1	0	2	4	4	0	3				—	3–1
4	Siġġiewi	3	0	0	3	3	11	−8	0					—

Source: MaltaFootball.com

=== Group 4 ===
Pos	Team	Pld	W	D	L	GF	GA	GD	Pts	Qualification	LQA	MDN	ŻRQ	SIR
1	Luqa St. Andrew's	3	2	1	0	9	1	+8	7	Advance to knockout phase	—	1–1	2–0	6–0
2	Mdina Knights	3	2	1	0	5	3	+2	7			—	2–1	2–1
3	Żurrieq	3	1	0	2	4	4	0	3				—	3–0
4	Sirens	3	0	0	3	1	11	−10	0					—

Source: MaltaFootball.com

=== Group 5 ===
Pos	Team	Pld	W	D	L	GF	GA	GD	Pts	Qualification	GXQ	MĠR	BBĠ	KKP
1	Għaxaq	3	2	0	1	8	6	+2	6	Advance to knockout phase	—	4–5	1–0	3–1
2	Mġarr United	3	2	0	1	7	6	+1	6			—	0–1	2–1
3	Birżebbuġa St. Peter's	3	2	0	1	2	1	+1	6				—	1–0
4	Kirkop United	3	0	0	3	2	6	−4	0					—

Source: MaltaFootball.com

=== Group 6 ===
Pos	Team	Pld	W	D	L	GF	GA	GD	Pts	Qualification	GĦR	SLC	QRD	FGR
1	Għargħur	3	3	0	0	10	1	+9	9	Advance to knockout phase	—	3–0	3–1	4–0
2	St. Lucia	3	2	0	1	5	4	+1	6			—	3–1	2–0
3	Qrendi	4	1	0	3	4	6	−2	3				—	2–0
4	Fgura United	3	0	0	3	0	8	−8	0					—

Source: MaltaFootball.com

=== Group 7 ===
Pos	Team	Pld	W	D	L	GF	GA	GD	Pts	Qualification	MLĦ	KKR	MRS	XJR
1	Mellieħa	3	3	0	0	11	2	+9	9	Advance to knockout phase	—	4–1	3–1	4–0
2	Kalkara	3	2	0	1	7	5	+2	6			—	2–1	4–0
3	Marsa	3	0	1	2	3	6	−3	1				—	1–1
4	Xgħajra Tornadoes	3	0	1	2	1	9	−8	1					—

Source: MaltaFootball.com

=== Group 8 ===
Pos	Team	Pld	W	D	L	GF	GA	GD	Pts	Qualification	ŻTN	NXR	SVN
1	Żejtun Corinthians	2	1	1	0	4	2	+2	4	Advance to knockout phase	—	0–0	4–2
2	Naxxar Lions	2	1	1	0	1	0	+1	4			—	1–0
3	St. Venera Lightnings	2	0	0	2	2	5	−3	0				—

Source: MaltaFootball.com

== Knockout phase ==
Quarter-finals
26 December
Għargħur	4
Luqa St. Andrew's	1
27 December
Senglea Athletic	3
Għaxaq	2
26 December
Żebbuġ Rangers	0
Mellieħa	3
27 December
Żejtun Corinthians (a.e.t.)	2
Lija Athletic	0

Semi-finals
10 February
Għargħur	5
Senglea Athletic	3
10 February
Żejtun Corinthians	1
Mellieħa	0

Final
28 May
Għargħur	1
Żejtun Corinthians	2

== See also ==
- 2009–10 Maltese Second Division
- 2009–10 Maltese Third Division
