= List of football clubs in Malta =

This is a list of football clubs in Malta and Gozo.

All football Clubs in Malta

Clubs in Malta and Gozo	Home city
Attard	Attard
Balzan	Balzan
Birkirkara	Birkirkara
Birżebbuġa St. Peter's	Birżebbuġa
Dingli Swallows	Dingli
Fgura	Fgura
Floriana	Floriana
Għajnsielem	Għajnsielem (Gozo)
Għarb Rangers	Għarb (Gozo)
Għargħur	Għargħur
Għaxaq	Għaxaq
Gudja	Gudja
Gżira United	Gżira
Ħamrun Spartans	Ħamrun
Hibernians	Paola
Kalkara	Kalkara
Kerċem Ajax	Kerċem (Gozo)
Kirkop United	Kirkop
Lija Athletic	Lija and Iklin
Luqa St. Andrews	Luqa
Marsa	Marsa
Marsaskala	Marsaskala
Marsaxlokk	Marsaxlokk
Mdina Knights	Mdina
Melita	St. Julians
Mellieħa	Mellieħa
Mġarr United	Mġarr
Mosta	Mosta
Mqabba	Mqabba
Msida St. Joseph	Msida
Mtarfa	Mtarfa
Munxar Falcons	Munxar (Gozo)
Nadur Youngsters	Nadur (Gozo)
Naxxar Lions	Naxxar
Oratory Youths	Victoria (Gozo)
Pembroke	Pembroke
Pietà Hotspurs	Pietà
Qala Saints	Qala (Gozo)
Qormi	Qormi
Qrendi	Qrendi
Rabat Ajax	Rabat
San Ġwann	San Ġwann
Sannat Lions	Sannat (Gozo)
Santa Lucia	Santa Luċija
Senglea Athletic	Senglea
Siġġiewi	Siġġiewi
Sirens	St. Paul's Bay
Sliema Wanderers	Sliema
St. Andrews	St. Andrew's
St. George's	Cospicua
St. Lawrence Spurs	San Lawrenz (Gozo)
St. Venera Lightnings	Santa Venera
Swieqi United	Swieqi
S.K. Victoria Wanderers	Victoria (Gozo)
Ta' Xbiex	Ta' Xbiex
Tarxien Rainbows	Tarxien
Valletta	Valletta
Victoria Hotspurs	Victoria (Gozo)
Vittoriosa Stars	Vittoriosa
Xagħra United	Xagħra (Gozo)
Xewkija Tigers	Xewkija (Gozo)
Xghajra Tornadoes	Xgħajra
Żabbar St. Patrick	Żabbar
Żebbuġ Rangers	Żebbuġ
Żebbuġ Rovers	Żebbuġ (Gozo)
Żejtun Corinthians	Żejtun
Żurrieq	Żurrieq
