= 2014–15 Maltese FA Trophy =

Tournament details
- Country: Malta
- Teams: 64

Final positions
- Champions: Birkirkara (5th title)
- Runners-up: Hibernians

Tournament statistics
- Matches played: 60
- Goals scored: 229 (3.82 per match)

The 2014–15 Maltese FA Trophy was the 77th season since its establishment. The competition began on 4 September 2014 and ended with the final on 23 May 2015.

Valletta were the defending champions, but were eliminated in the semi-finals by Birkirkara.

== Calendar ==
Matches began on 4 September 2014 and concluded on 24 May 2015.

Round	Date(s)	Number of fixtures	Clubs	New entries this round	Goals / games
First round	4–10 September 2014	12	24 → 12	24	39 / 12
Second round	24–26 October 2014	20	40 → 20	28	81 / 20
Third round	28 November–3 December 2014	16	32 → 16	12	62 / 16
Fourth round	20–21 January 2015	8	16 → 8	none	31 / 8
Quarter-finals	13–14 February 2015	4	8 → 4	none	16 / 4
Semi-finals	16–17 May 2015	2	4 → 2	none	3 / 2
Final	24 May 2015	1	2 → 1	none	

== First round ==
A total of 24 teams competed in the first round. Matches were played between 4 and 10 September 2014.

Team 1	Score	Team 2
4 September 2014
Mġarr United (4)	1–4	Kalkara (4)
6 September 2014
Qrendi (4)	2–0	Marsaxlokk (4)
Marsaskala (4)	0–2	St. Venera Lightnings (4)
(Gozo) Xewkija Tigers (1G)	0–1	Kirkop United (4)
(Gozo) Qala St. Joseph (2G)	2–3 (a.e.t.)	St. Lucia (4)
7 September 2014
Mdina Knights (4)	0–2 (a.e.t.)	(Gozo) St. Lawrence Spurs (1G)
Ta Xbiex (4)	1–2	(Gozo) Victoria Hotspurs (1G)
(Gozo) Oratory Youths (1G)	4–3 (a.e.t.)	Luqa St. Andrew's (4)
(Gozo) Għajnsielem (2G)	0–2	Mtarfa (4)
8 September 2014
(Gozo) Kerċem Ajax (1G)	3–0	Attard (4)
10 September 2014
(Gozo) Victoria Wanderers (1G)	3–0	(Gozo) Munxar Falcons (2G)
(Gozo) Xagħra United (2G)	0–5	(Gozo) Nadur Youngsters (1G)

== Second round ==
A total of 40 teams competed in the second round. Matches were played on 24, 25 and 26 October 2014.

Team 1	Score	Team 2
24 October 2014
Hamrun Spartans (3)	2−2 (a.e.t.) (3–1 p)	Vittoriosa Stars (2)
Xghajra Tornadoes (3)	1–2	Siggiewi (3)
Kalkara (4)	0–7	Swieqi United (3)
25 October 2014
Żabbar St. Patrick (3)	2–1	St. Lucia (4)
Gzira United (2)	8–0	Ghaxaq (3)
Lija Athletic (2)	7–0	(Gozo) Oratory Youths (1G)
Dingli Swallows (3)	1–2 (a.e.t.)	Zurrieq (2)
Mtarfa (4)	0–4	Gudja United (2)
Gharghur (3)	2–1	(Gozo) St. Lawrence Spurs (1G)
Birzebbuga St. Peters (2)	3–2 (a.e.t.)	(Gozo) Kerċem Ajax (1G)
St. George's (2)	2−2 (a.e.t.) (5–4 p)	Luxol St. Andrews (2)
26 October 2014
(Gozo) Victoria Wanderers (1G)	0–2	Kirkop United (4)
Fgura United (2)	1–2	(Gozo) Nadur Youngsters (1G)
Melita (2)	1–0 (a.e.t.)	Zejtun Corinthians (3)
Msida St. Joseph (2)	4–1	Marsa (3)
Sirens (3)	1−1 (a.e.t.) (7–6 p)	San Gwann (3)
Mellieha (3)	1–5	(Gozo) Victoria Hotspurs (1G)
Pembroke Athleta (2)	2–1	Rabat Ajax (2)
Mqabba (2)	2–3	Senglea Athletics (3)
Qrendi (4)	2–1	St. Venera Lightnings (4)

== Third round ==
A total of 32 teams competed in the third round. Matches were played on 29 and 30 November, and on 2 and 3 December 2014.

Team 1	Score	Team 2
29 November 2014
(Gozo) Nadur Youngsters (1G)	4–1	Gharghur (3)
Swieqi United (3)	0–6	Gzira United (2)
Msida St. Joseph (2)	1–2	Żabbar St. Patrick (3)
30 November 2014
Sirens (3)	1–0	Lija Athletic (2)
2 December 2014
St. George's (2)	0–2	Hibernians (1)
Balzan (1)	2–0	Kirkop United (4)
Birzebbuga St. Peters (2)	1–7	Valletta (1)
Siggiewi (3)	5–2	Zurrieq (2)
Pembroke Athleta (2)	0–1 (a.e.t.)	Pietà Hotspurs (1)
Naxxar Lions (1)	1–2	Melita (2)
3 December 2014
Mosta (1)	6–1	Senglea Athletics (3)
Birkirkara (1)	7–1	Hamrun Spartans (3)
Floriana (1)	0–0 (a.e.t.) (5–4 p)	Sliema Wanderers (1)
Tarxien Rainbows (1)	0–3	Gudja United (2)
Zebbug Rangers (1)	0–3	(Gozo) Victoria Hotspurs (1G)
Qrendi (4)	0–3	Qormi (1)

== Fourth round ==
A total of 16 teams competed in the fourth round. Matches were played on 20 and 21 January 2015.

Team 1	Score	Team 2
20 January 2015
Melita (2)	0–2	Valletta (1)
Gżira United (2)	1–4	Mosta (1)
21 January 2015
Gudja United (2)	0–6	Sirens (3)
(Gozo) Victoria Hotspurs (1G)	0–1	Pietà Hotspurs (1)
(Gozo) Nadur Youngsters (1G)	1–3	Hibernians (1)
Floriana (1)	1–3	Qormi (1)
Balzan (1)	6–0	Żabbar St. Patrick (3)
Siggiewi (3)	0–3	Birkirkara (1)

== Quarter-finals ==
Eight teams competed in the quarter-finals. Matches were played on 13 and 14 February 2015.

Team 1	Score	Team 2
13 February 2015
Mosta (1)	1–3	Valletta (1)
Balzan (1)	1–1 (a.e.t.) (3–4 p)	Hibernians (1)
14 February 2015
Qormi (1)	7–0	Sirens (3)
Birkirkara (1)	3–0	Pietà Hotspurs (1)

== Semi-finals ==
Matches were played on 16 and 17 May 2015.

16 May 2015	Birkirkara (1)	1–0 (a.e.t.)	Valletta (1)	Ta' Qali
17:00 CEST	Fenech 110'	Report		Stadium: Ta' Qali National Stadium; Referee: Fyodor Zammit

17 May 2015	Qormi (1)	0–2	Hibernians (1)	Ta' Qali
17:00 CEST		Report	Agius 11'; Jorginho 65'	Stadium: Ta' Qali National Stadium; Referee: Trustin Farrugia Cann

== Final ==
The final was played on 23 May 2015.

Birkirkara and Hibernians never meet in the final. It was the eighth final for Birkirkara, and they won it four times. For Hibernians, this was the twenty-one final, and they won it ten times.

The last time Birkirkara and Hibernians met together in Maltese FA Trophy was during the 2005-06 Semi-finals when Hibernians beat Birkirkara 1–0.

23 May 2015
17:00 CEST

Birkirkara (1)	2–0	Hibernians (1)
Mazzetti 29'; Ledesma 69'	Report

Ta' Qali National Stadium, Ta' Qali
Referee: Andre Arciola
