= 2023–24 Maltese National Amateur League =

Maltese National Amateur League
- Season: 2023–24
- Dates: 15 September 2023 – 23 April 2024
- Champions: Mgarr United
- Promoted: Mgarr United; Mtarfa
- Relegated: Dingli Swallows; Ghaxaq; Kalkara United; Mdina Knights; Mqabba; Santa Venera Lightning; Siggiewi; St. George's; Ta' Xbiex
- Matches: 239
- Goals: 908 (3.8 per match)
- Top goalscorer: Kurt Borg (33 Goals)
- Biggest home win: San Ġwann 11-0 Ta' Xbiex (28 January 2024)
- Biggest away win: Ta' Xbiex 0-10 Mgarr United (28 October 2023)
- Highest scoring: Ta' Xbiex 1-10 Vittoriosa Stars (20 January 2024); San Ġwann 11-0 Ta' Xbiex (28 January 2024); Kirkop United 10-1 Ta' Xbiex (7 April 2024)
- Longest winning run: Mtarfa (8 Games)
- Longest unbeaten run: Mtarfa (13 Games)
- Longest winless run: Mdina Knights (23 Games)
- Longest losing run: Mdina Knights (21 Games)
- All statistics correct as of 23 April 2024.

The 2023–24 Maltese National Amateur League (referred to, for sponsorship reasons, as the IZIBet National Amateur League) occurs between 15 September 2023 and 23 April 2024. This is the fourth season since the Second and Third divisions were unified into the two-group Amateur League system. The Maltese National Amateur League is Malta's third-highest professional football division. The 2023-24 League winners will be promoted to the Maltese Challenge League.

== Team changes ==
The following teams have changed divisions since the 2022–23 season:

| Promoted from 2022–23 Maltese National Amateur League | Relegated from 2022–23 Maltese Challenge League |
|---|---|
| Senglea Athletic; Msida Saint-Joseph; Luqa St. Andrew's; Zabbar St. Patrick | Marsaskala; Mqabba; Mtarfa; Qrendi; San Gwann; Vittoriosa Stars |

== Teams ==
Twenty-Three teams competed in the 2023-24 League. These teams were split into two groups.

Location of Maltese clubs played in Maltese Premier League

| Team | Location | Manager |
|---|---|---|
| Birzebbuga St. Peter's | Birzebbuga | (Malta) Edward Azzopardi |
| Dingli Swallows | Dingli | (Malta) Nicolai Caruana |
| Gharghur | Gharghur | (Malta) Kevin Borg Degiorgio |
| Ghaxaq | Ghaxaq | (Malta) Spiridione Curmi |
| Kalkara United | Kalkara | (Malta) Paul Bugeja |
| Kirkop United | Kirkop | (Malta) Matthew Caruana |
| Marsaskala | Marsaskala | (Malta) Brian Vella |
| Mdina Knights | Mdina | (Malta) Roland Sollars |
| Mellieħa | Mellieħa | (Malta) Warren Said |
| Mgarr United | Mgarr | (Malta) Brian Spiteri |
| Mqabba | Mqabba | (Malta) Vincent Carbonaro |
| Mtarfa | Mtarfa | (Malta) George Magri |
| Pembroke Athleta | Pembroke | (Malta) Jeffrey Mifsud |
| Qormi | Qormi | (Malta) Lydon Fenech |
| Qrendi | Qrendi | (Malta) Gotthard Conti |
| Rabat Ajax | Rabat | (Malta) Paul Falzon |
| San Ġwann | San Ġwann | (Malta) Xavier Saliba |
| Santa Venera Lightnings | Santa Venera | (Malta) Marco Grech |
| Siggiewi | Siggiewi | (Malta) David Mifsud |
| St. George's | Cospicua | (Malta) Trevor Thomas |
| Ta' Xbiex | Ta' Xbiex | (Malta) Mario Fenech |
| Vittoriosa Stars | Birgu | (Malta) Dennis Apap |
| Xgħajra Tornados | Xghajra | (Malta) Keith Darmanin |

=== Managerial changes ===
| Team | Outgoing manager | Manner of departure | Date of vacancy | Position in table | Incoming manager | Date of appointment |
|---|---|---|---|---|---|---|
| Mellieha | (Malta) Antoine Camilleri | Sacked | 6 October 2023 | 9th (Group A) | (England) Roger Walker and (Croatia) Ivan Mandic (Caretakers) | 6 October 2023 |
| Siġġiewi | (Malta) Alexander Delia | Sacked | 19 November 2023 | 11th (Group A) | (Malta) David Mifsud | 19 November 2023 |
| Mellieha | (England) Roger Walker and (Croatia) Ivan Mandic | End of Caretakers | 3 January 2024 | 9th (Group A) | (Malta) Warren Said | 3 January 2024 |
| Mġarr United | (Malta) Jason Camenzuli | Sacked | 4 February 2024 | 2nd (Group B) | (Malta) Brian Spiteri | 5 February 2024 |

== Venues ==
| 2023–24 Maltese National Amateur League is located in Malta | Pembroke | Mosta | San Pawl il-Baħar | Ta' Qali | Hamrun |
|---|---|---|---|---|---|
| 2023–24 Maltese National Amateur League is located in Malta | Luxol Stadium | Charles Abela Stadium | Sirens Stadium | Centenary Stadium | Victor Tedesco Stadium |
| 2023–24 Maltese National Amateur League is located in Malta | Capacity: 600 | Capacity: 700 | Capacity: 800 | Capacity: 3,000 | Capacity: 1,962 |

== League stage ==
=== Group A ===
| Pos | Team | Pld | W | D | L | GF | GA | GD | Pts | Qualification or relegation |
|---|---|---|---|---|---|---|---|---|---|---|
| 1 | Mtarfa (P) | 22 | 17 | 4 | 1 | 71 | 13 | +58 | 55 | Promotion to the 2024–25 Maltese Challenge League and Championship play-offs |
| 2 | Birzebbuga St. Peter's | 22 | 15 | 4 | 3 | 67 | 26 | +41 | 49 | |
| 3 | Qrendi | 22 | 13 | 2 | 7 | 55 | 28 | +27 | 41 | |
| 4 | Xgħajra Tornados | 22 | 11 | 4 | 7 | 33 | 30 | +3 | 37 | |
| 5 | Mellieħa | 22 | 11 | 4 | 7 | 50 | 29 | +21 | 37 | |
| 6 | Rabat Ajax (Note: Rabat Ajax and Mqabba finished equal on points, A play-off decider determines the seventh place and Qualification for the relegation play-offs) | 22 | 10 | 4 | 8 | 31 | 29 | +2 | 34 | |
| 7 | Mqabba (R) | 22 | 11 | 1 | 10 | 33 | 32 | +1 | 34 | Qualification for the relegation play-offs |
| 8 | Pembroke Athleta | 22 | 9 | 3 | 10 | 50 | 51 | −1 | 30 | Qualification for the relegation play-offs |
| 9 | Santa Venera Lightning (R) | 22 | 7 | 4 | 11 | 32 | 47 | −15 | 25 | Relegation to the 2024–25 Maltese National Amateur League 2 |
| 10 | Siggiewi (R) | 22 | 5 | 3 | 14 | 23 | 47 | −24 | 18 | Relegation to the 2024–25 Maltese National Amateur League 2 |
| 11 | Kalkara United (R) | 22 | 4 | 4 | 14 | 30 | 73 | −43 | 16 | Relegation to the 2024–25 Maltese National Amateur League 2 |
| 12 | Mdina Knights (R) | 22 | 0 | 1 | 21 | 6 | 75 | −69 | 1 | Relegation to the 2024–25 Maltese National Amateur League 2 |

Updated to match(es) played on 14 April 2024. Source:
Rules for classification: 1) Points; 2) Play-offs (only if needed to decide champions, relegation, or teams for relegation play-offs).
(P) Promoted; (R) Relegated

=== Group A Results ===
| Home \ Away | BRZ | KLK | MDI | MLĦ | MQA | MTF | PBK | QRE | RBT | SVL | SIG | XJR |
|---|---|---|---|---|---|---|---|---|---|---|---|---|
| Birzebbuga St. Peter's | — | 7–1 | 6–0 | 3–3 | 3–0 | 0–3 | 3–1 | 1–0 | 3–1 | 5–1 | 2–0 | 2–1 |
| Kalkara United | 1–1 | — | 3–0 | 0–9 | 0–1 | 2–5 | 1–5 | 0–4 | 2–4 | 2–2 | 1–4 | 0–0 |
| Mdina Knights | 0–5 | 0–2 | — | 0–5 | 1–3 | 0–4 | 1–6 | 1–3 | 0–2 | 0–4 | 0–3 | 1–1 |
| Mellieħa | 3–2 | 1–2 | 2–0 | — | 0–3 | 0–0 | 2–0 | 2–1 | 1–3 | 2–2 | 4–0 | 0–1 |
| Mqabba | 1–4 | 4–2 | 3–1 | 0–3 | — | 0–3 | 1–3 | 0–3 | 2–0 | 1–0 | 2–0 | 1–2 |
| Mtarfa | 1–1 | 7–0 | 7–0 | 2–1 | 2–0 | — | 1–1 | 2–4 | 4–0 | 4–0 | 4–1 | 3–0 |
| Pembroke Athleta | 2–7 | 8–3 | 2–0 | 1–3 | 1–1 | 1–8 | — | 4–5 | 0–0 | 0–3 | 4–1 | 2–1 |
| Qrendi | 4–1 | 3–0 | 4–1 | 1–3 | 0–3 | 0–1 | 5–3 | — | 0–0 | 6–0 | 3–0 | 1–2 |
| Rabat Ajax | 1–2 | 2–4 | 2–0 | 2–1 | 0–3 | 1–1 | 2–1 | 0–0 | — | 4–0 | 2–0 | 1–0 |
| Santa Venera Lightning | 1–3 | 2–1 | 2–0 | 3–3 | 1–0 | 0–3 | 1–2 | 2–1 | 3–1 | — | 0–1 | 2–3 |
| Siggiewi | 1–1 | 3–2 | 2–0 | 1–2 | 1–3 | 0–4 | 0–3 | 1–4 | 0–2 | 1–1 | — | 1–1 |
| Xgħajra Tornados | 0–5 | 1–1 | 4–0 | 2–0 | 2–1 | 1–2 | 2–0 | 1–3 | 2–1 | 4–2 | 2–1 | — |

Updated to match(es) played on 14 April 2024. Source:
Legend: Blue = home team win; Yellow = draw; Red = away team win.

=== Group B ===
| Pos | Team | Pld | W | D | L | GF | GA | GD | Pts | Qualification or relegation |
|---|---|---|---|---|---|---|---|---|---|---|
| 1 | Mgarr United (C) | 20 | 14 | 4 | 2 | 68 | 18 | +50 | 46 | Promotion to the 2024–25 Maltese Challenge League and Championship play-offs |
| 2 | Qormi | 20 | 11 | 4 | 5 | 47 | 31 | +16 | 37 | |
| 3 | Marsaskala | 20 | 12 | 1 | 7 | 39 | 29 | +10 | 37 | |
| 4 | San Ġwann | 20 | 10 | 5 | 5 | 52 | 29 | +23 | 35 | |
| 5 | Gharghur | 20 | 10 | 4 | 6 | 34 | 25 | +9 | 34 | |
| 6 | Kirkop United | 20 | 10 | 2 | 8 | 52 | 27 | +25 | 32 | |
| 7 | St. George's (R) | 20 | 9 | 4 | 7 | 47 | 35 | +12 | 31 | Qualification for the relegation play-offs |
| 8 | Vittoriosa Stars | 20 | 9 | 5 | 6 | 50 | 27 | +23 | 29 (Note: Vittoriosa Stars were docked three points.) | Qualification for the relegation play-offs |
| 9 | Ghaxaq (R) | 20 | 4 | 2 | 14 | 35 | 63 | −28 | 14 | Relegation to the 2024–25 Maltese National Amateur League 2 |
| 10 | Dingli Swallows (R) | 20 | 3 | 1 | 16 | 18 | 67 | −49 | 10 | Relegation to the 2024–25 Maltese National Amateur League 2 |
| 11 | Ta' Xbiex (R) | 20 | 2 | 0 | 18 | 23 | 113 | −90 | 6 | Relegation to the 2024–25 Maltese National Amateur League 2 |

Updated to match(es) played on 20 April 2024. Source:
Rules for classification: 1) Points; 2) Play-offs (only if needed to decide champions, relegation, or teams for relegation play-offs).
(C) Champions; (R) Relegated

=== Group B Results ===
| Home \ Away | DIN | GHR | GHX | KRK | MRK | MGR | QOR | SGN | STG | XBX | VIT |
|---|---|---|---|---|---|---|---|---|---|---|---|
| Dingli Swallows | — | 0–4 | 0–3 | 0–1 | 2–1 | 0–4 | 1–4 | 1–2 | 2–1 | 1–2 | 1–5 |
| Gharghur | 0–1 | — | 2–1 | 0–2 | 1–0 | 2–2 | 3–0 | 1–5 | 1–2 | 4–0 | 0–0 |
| Ghaxaq | 1–0 | 0–4 | — | 2–3 | 1–3 | 1–4 | 1–4 | 1–6 | 1–5 | 5–1 | 2–2 |
| Kirkop United | 9–1 | 5–0 | 1–0 | — | 0–2 | 0–1 | 3–3 | 0–1 | 1–3 | 10–1 | 0–2 |
| Marsaskala | 3–2 | 1–0 | 4–3 | 0–2 | — | 0–1 | 5–2 | 0–1 | 3–2 | 4–1 | 0–3 |
| Mgarr United | 6–0 | 0–0 | 10–0 | 2–1 | 5–3 | — | 2–2 | 3–1 | 1–0 | 9–0 | 2–0 |
| Qormi | 3–0 | 1–1 | 3–0 | 2–1 | 0–1 | 1–2 | — | 1–1 | 5–2 | 4–1 | 1–0 |
| San Ġwann | 0–0 | 2–3 | 3–2 | 3–3 | 1–2 | 2–0 | 3–1 | — | 1–4 | 11–0 | 1–1 |
| St. George's | 6–1 | 1–2 | 2–2 | 2–1 | 0–2 | 1–1 | 2–5 | 1–1 | — | 6–3 | 1–0 |
| Ta' Xbiex | 4–6 | 0–3 | 2–8 | 1–7 | 1–4 | 0–10 | 1–2 | 1–5 | 0–4 | — | 1–10 |
| Vittoriosa Stars | 7–0 | 3–2 | 4–1 | 1–2 | 1–1 | 4–3 | 1–2 | 4–2 | 2–2 | 0–3 (Note: Ta' Xbiex were awarded a 3–0 win after the Malta Football Association's Protests Board upheld their protest. Originally, the match ended in a 5–1 to Vittoriosa Stars.) | — |

Updated to match(es) played on 14 April 2024. Source:
Legend: Blue = home team win; Yellow = draw; Red = away team win.

=== Group A Sixth Place tie-breaker ===
With both Mqabba and Rabat Ajax level on 34 points, a play-off match was conducted to the looser qualify for the Relegation Play-offs

| 18 April 2024 | Rabat Ajax | 2–1 | Mqabba | Ħamrun |
| 20:00 CEST | Andy Paul Camilleri 29'; Immy Micallef 72' (pen.) | | Nikolai Farrugia Cross (yellow card) 60'; Ishmael Galea 90+5' | Stadium: Victor Tedesco Stadium; Referee: Slawomir Olucha |

=== Championship final ===
| 20 April 2024 | Mtarfa | 0–2 | Mgarr United | Ta' Qali |
| 16:00 CEST | Luca Bugeja (yellow card) 15'; Jeremy Busuttil (yellow card) 23'; Andrea Azzopardi (yellow card) 33'; Gabriel Nazareno Mannino (yellow card) 90+7' | | Nicholas Schembri (yellow card) 19'; Julian Camilleri (yellow card) 21'; Jurgen Suda 45+1' (pen.), (yellow card) 45+1'; Jacob Chircop St John (yellow card) 84'; Saint Ebisindor Christian 90+4' | Stadium: Centenary Stadium; Referee: Vladimir Rizoski |

=== Relegation play-offs ===
| 23 April 2024 | St. George's | 0–0 (a.e.t.) (4–5 p) | Pembroke Athleta | Ta' Qali |
| 20:45 CEST | Erson Schembri (yellow card) 14'; Irvin Abela (yellow card) 40'; Loumar Cutajar (yellow card) 62'; Owen Galea (yellow card) 109' | | Kyle Sciberras Balbi (yellow card) 19'; Weverton Gomes (yellow card) 41'; Jordan Busuttil (yellow card) 73' | Stadium: Centenary Stadium; Referee: Daniel Casha |
| | Penalties |
| | Ivan Bojovic (penalty scored); Erson Schembri (penalty scored); Neil Buttigieg (penalty scored); Adrian Caruana (penalty scored); Dylan Grima (penalty missed) | | (penalty scored) Weverton Gomes; (penalty scored) Kyle Sciberras Balbi; (penalty scored) Mouied Algazali; (penalty scored) Nigel Zahra; (penalty scored) Jordan Vella |

| 23 April 2024 | Mqabba | 1–2 | Vittoriosa Stars | Hamrun |
| 19:30 CEST | Daniel Scerri (yellow card) 60'; Andrei Spiteri (yellow card) 71'; Leighton Grech (yellow card) 77'; Andres Tenorio Viveros 70'; Shaban Chikh Ali (yellow card) 90+4' | | Gabriel Sant (yellow card) 51'; Joseph Jojo Ogunnupe 52', 90+3' (pen.) | Stadium: Victor Tedesco Stadium; Referee: Joseph Scerri |

== Season statistics ==
=== Scoring ===
==== Top scorers ====
As of 23 April 2024

| Rank | Player | Club | Goals |
|---|---|---|---|
| 1 | (Malta) Kurt Borg | Mtarfa | 33 |
| 2 | (Brazil) Samuel Saldanha | Birżebbuġa St. Peter's | 30 |
| 3 | (Brazil) Weverton Gomes Souza | Pembroke Athleta | 28 |
| 4 | (Nigeria) Saint Ebisindor Christian | Mgarr United | 23 |
| 5 | (Malta) Brandon Bray | Qrendi | 21 |
| 6 | (Nigeria) Richmond Baratuipre Hanson | Santa Venera Lightnings | 19 |
| 7 | (Serbia) Luka Mijic | Mellieha | 17 |
| 8 | (Malta) Ryan Dalli | Kirkop United | 16 |
| 8 | (Nigeria) Joseph Jojo Ogunnupe | Vittoriosa Stars | 16 |
| 10 | (Malta) Jayden Borg | Qormi | 14 |
| 11 | (Libya) Nezar Fawzi Abouhaisa | San Gwann | 13 |
| 12 | (Malta) Jurgen Suda | Mgarr United | 12 |
| 12 | (Malta) Gianfranco Micallef | Mtarfa | 12 |

==== Hat-tricks ====
| Player | For | Against | Result | Group | Stadium | Date |
|---|---|---|---|---|---|---|
| (Brazil) Samuel Saldanha | Birżebbuġa St. Peter's | Pembroke Athleta | 7–2 (A) | A | Sirens Stadium, San Pawl il-Baħar | 24 September 2023 |
| (Brazil) Weverton Gomes | Pembroke Athleta | Mdina Knights | 6–1 (A) | A | Charles Abela Memorial Stadium, Mosta | 7 October 2023 |
| (Colombia) Andres Tenorio Viveros | Mqabba | Kalkara United | 4–2 (H) | A | Sirens Stadium, San Pawl il-Baħar | 7 October 2023 |
| (Nigeria) Saint Ebisindor Christian^{6} | Mgarr United | Ghaxaq | 10–0 (H) | B | Centenary Stadium, Ta' Qali | 20 October 2023 |
| (Nigeria) Saint Ebisindor Christian^{5} | Mgarr United | Ta' Xbiex | 10–0 (A) | B | Sirens Stadium, San Pawl il-Baħar | 28 October 2023 |
| (Brazil) Samuel Saldanha | Birżebbuġa St. Peter's | Santa Venera Lightnings | 5–1 (A) | A | Sirens Stadium, San Pawl il-Baħar | 29 October 2023 |
| (Malta) Morientes Muscat | St. George's | Ghaxaq | 5–1 (A) | B | Sirens Stadium, San Pawl il-Baħar | 12 November 2023 |
| (Colombia) Deison Arvey Cuero | Siggiewi | Mdina Knights | 3–0 (A) | A | Sirens Stadium, San Pawl il-Baħar | 25 November 2023 |
| (Malta) Aaron Agius | Ghaxaq | Ta' Xbiex | 8–2 (A) | B | Sirens Stadium, San Pawl il-Baħar | 26 November 2023 |
| (Malta) Brandon Bray^{4} | Qrendi | Birżebbuġa St. Peter's | 4–1 (H) | A | Sirens Stadium, San Pawl il-Baħar | 10 December 2023 |
| (Malta) Kurt Borg | Mtarfa | Mdina Knights | 7–0 (H) | A | Centenary Stadium, Ta' Qali | 10 December 2023 |
| (Malta) Kurt Borg^{4} | Mtarfa | Pembroke Athleta | 8-1 (A) | A | Sirens Stadium, San Pawl il-Baħar | 16 December 2023 |
| (Malta) Gianfranco Micallef | Mtarfa | Pembroke Athleta | 8-1 (A) | A | Sirens Stadium, San Pawl il-Baħar | 16 December 2023 |
| (Malta) Ryan Dalli^{4} | Kirkop United | Ta' Xbiex | 7–1 (A) | B | Centenary Stadium, Ta' Qali | 5 January 2024 |
| (Malta) Brandon Bray^{4} | Qrendi | Pembroke Athleta | 5–3 (H) | A | Victor Tedesco Stadium, Hamrun | 8 January 2024 |
| (Brazil) Weverton Gomes | Pembroke Athleta | Qrendi | 3–5 (A) | A | Victor Tedesco Stadium, Hamrun | 8 January 2024 |
| (Malta) Giovanni Galea | Kirkop United | Dingli Swallows | 9–1 (H) | B | Charles Abela Memorial Stadium, Mosta | 14 January 2024 |
| (Malta) Ryan Dalli | Kirkop United | Dingli Swallows | 9–1 (H) | B | Charles Abela Memorial Stadium, Mosta | 14 January 2024 |
| (Libya) Nezar Fawzi Abouhaisa | San Ġwann | Ghaxaq | 6–1 (A) | B | Centenary Stadium, Ta' Qali | 19 January 2024 |
| (Malta) Jayden Borg | Qormi | Dingli Swallows | 4–1 (A) | B | Charles Abela Memorial Stadium, Mosta | 20 January 2024 |
| (Syria) Shaban Chikh Ali^{4} | Vittoriosa Stars | Ta' Xbiex | 10–1 (A) | B | Sirens Stadium, San Pawl il-Baħar | 20 January 2024 |
| (Brazil) Samuel Saldanha | Birżebbuġa St. Peter's | Mdina Knights | 5–0 (A) | A | Luxol Stadium, Pembroke | 21 January 2024 |
| (Malta) Andre Joe Cutajar^{4} | San Ġwann | Ta' Xbiex | 11–0 (A) | B | Sirens Stadium, San Pawl il-Baħar | 28 January 2024 |
| (Poland) Syzmon Grzegorz Plocica | San Ġwann | Ta' Xbiex | 11–0 (A) | B | Sirens Stadium, San Pawl il-Baħar | 28 January 2024 |
| (Libya) Nezar Fawzi Abouhaisa | San Ġwann | Ta' Xbiex | 11–0 (A) | B | Sirens Stadium, San Pawl il-Baħar | 28 January 2024 |
| (Malta) Brandon Bray | Qrendi | Siggiewi | 4–1 (A) | A | Luxol Stadium, Pembroke | 4 February 2024 |
| (Brazil) Samuel Saldanha | Birżebbuġa St. Peter's | Kalkara United | 7–1 (H) | A | Sirens Stadium, San Pawl il-Baħar | 10 February 2024 |
| (Brazil) Weverton Gomes^{5} | Pembroke Athleta | Kalkara United | 8–3 (H) | A | Charles Abela Memorial Stadium, Mosta | 24 February 2024 |
| (Nigeria) Richmond Baratuipre Hanson | Santa Venera Lightnings | Mdina Knights | 4–0 (A) | A | Sirens Stadium, San Pawl il-Baħar | 24 February 2024 |
| (Serbia) Luka Mijic | Mellieħa | Kalkara United | 9–0 (A) | A | Sirens Stadium, San Pawl il-Baħar | 3 March 2024 |
| (Brazil) Weverton Gomes | Pembroke Athleta | Siggiewi | 4–1 (H) | A | Sirens Stadium, San Pawl il-Baħar | 9 March 2024 |
| (Malta) Timothy John Thomas | St. George's | Ta' Xbiex | 6–3 (H) | B | Sirens Stadium, San Pawl il-Baħar | 10 March 2024 |
| (Malta) Jurgen Gerada | Ghaxaq | Dingli Swallows | 3–0 (A) | B | Sirens Stadium, San Pawl il-Baħar | 10 March 2024 |
| (Malta) Shamison Farrugia | Dingli Swallows | Ta' Xbiex | 6–4 (A) | B | Sirens Stadium, San Pawl il-Baħar | 16 March 2024 |
| (Malta) Brandon Bray | Qrendi | Pembroke Athleta | 5–4 (A) | A | Luxol Stadium, Pembroke | 6 April 2024 |
| (Malta) Ryan Dalli | Kirkop United | Ta' Xbiex | 10–1 (H) | B | Charles Abela Memorial Stadium, Mosta | 6 April 2024 |
| (Malta) Kurt Borg^{4} | Mtarfa | Kalkara United | 7–0 (H) | A | Centenary Stadium, Ta' Qali | 14 April 2024 |

Notes

^{4} Player scored 4 goalss
^{5} Player scored 5 goalss
^{6} Player scored 6 goals

=== Clean sheets ===
As of 20 April 2024

| Rank | Player | Club | Clean sheets |
|---|---|---|---|
| 1 | (Malta) Dunstan Zarb | Mtarfa | 11 |
| 1 | (Malta) Jacob Chircop St John | Mgarr | 11 |
| 3 | (Malta) Dean Sciberras | Rabat Ajax | 9 |
| 4 | (Malta) Andrew Joseph Zammit | Gharghur | 8 |
| 5 | (Malta) James Abela | Mqabba | 7 |
| 5 | (Malta) Christian Cassar | Qrendi | 7 |
| 7 | (Malta) Mario Bartolo | Birzebbuga St. Peter's | 6 |
| 8 | (Malta) Clayton Rapa | Kirkop United | 5 |
| 8 | (Malta) Anthony Curmi | Mellieha | 5 |
| 10 | (Malta) Clyde Aquilina | Santa Venera Lightning | 4 |
| 10 | (Malta) Jonathan Grech | Vittoriosa Stars | 4 |

=== Discipline ===
==== Player ====
- Most yellow cards: 10
  - (Malta) Domenico Marsala (Dingli Swallows)
- Most red cards: 2
  - (Malta) Nicholas Formosa (Gharghur)
  - (Malta) Clive Fenech (Ghaxaq)
  - (Malta) Neil Borg (Mellieħa)
  - (Malta) Gianluca Sultana (St. George's)
  - (Malta) Theodoric Catania (Santa Venera Lightning)
  - (Malta) Miguel Agius (Ta' Xbiex)
  - (Malta) Liam Ciantar (Vittoriosa Stars)

==== Club ====
- Most yellow cards: 53
  - St. George's
- Most red cards: 5
  - Qormi
  - Ta' Xbiex

=== Awards ===
| Round | Manager of the First Round | | Player of the First Round | |
| Round | Manager | Club | Player | Club |
|---|---|---|---|---|
| First Round | (Malta) Lydon Fenech | Qormi | (Malta) Kurt Borg | Mtarfa |
