= Maltese Second and Third Division Knock-Out =

Football knockout competition in Malta

The Maltese Second and Third Division Knock-Out was an annual football knockout competition in Malta, held from 1995–96 to 2010–11 and contested exclusively by clubs from the Second and Third Division. The format consisted of the teams being drawn into eight groups, with the winners of each group progressing to the knockout phase of the competition.

== History ==
The Maltese Second and Third Division Knock-Out received its primary sponsorship from Maltco Lotteries, a subsidiary of Intralot, beginning in 2005, which led to the competition being officially named the Quick Keno Division II/III Knock-Out. This three-year agreement, signed on July 18, 2005, provided the highest cash prizes in the competition's history.

In its early years through 2009, the knockout continued, with Second Division sides dominating the honors. Melita won consecutive titles in 2007–08 and 2008–09, securing promotion to the First Division after the latter victory.

The competition saw continued interest in the late 2000s. The 2009–10 season marked a peak in attendance, rising by 100% as announced by Malta Football Association President Joe Mifsud. Żejtun Corinthians claimed the title that year with a 2–1 victory over Għargħur in the final. They defended the trophy in 2010–11, defeating Rabat Ajax 2–0 after extra time to complete a league-cup double.

== Qualifications ==
The Maltese Second and Third Division Knock-Out was exclusively contested by senior teams from Malta's Second and Third Divisions, with eligibility determined at the beginning of each season based on league membership. All clubs in these divisions received automatic qualification, ensuring an inclusive format for lower-tier teams; for instance, the 2008–09 edition featured 31 participating teams drawn from both divisions.

== Winners ==
Key to list of winners
†	Match decided by a penalty shoot-out after extra time

Season	Winners	Score	Runners–up
2000–01	Żebbuġ Rangers	4–1	Vittoriosa Stars
2001–02	Dingli Swallows	2–0	Żebbuġ Rangers
2002–03	Tarxien Rainbows	4–1	Sirens
2003–04	Mellieħa	2–1	Żebbuġ Rangers
2004–05	Qormi	1–0	Mellieħa
2005–06	Qormi	1–0†	Gżira United
2006–07	Balzan Youths	2–0	Birżebbuġa St. Peter's
2007–08	Melita	5–1	Balzan Youths
2008–09	Melita	3–0	St. Venera Lightnings
2009–10	Żejtun Corinthians	2–1	Għargħur
2010–11	Żejtun Corinthians	2–0	Rabat Ajax
