= Vesko Petrović =

Montenegrin footballer

Personal information
- Full name: Vesko Petrović
- Date of birth: 28 December 1965 (age 60)
- Place of birth: Kotor, SR Montenegro, SFR Yugoslavia

Senior career*
Years	Team	Apps	(Gls)
1985-1990	Bokelj		
1990-1992	Velež Mostar		
1993-1994	Rabat Ajax	16	(6)
1994–1995	Żabbar St. Patrick	17	(9)
1995–1996	Dingli Swallows	17	(5)
1996	Valletta	0	(0)
1996	Xagħra United		
1997	Marsa	4	(0)
1997–1998	Żabbar St. Patrick	16	(4)
1998–2000	Rabat Ajax	31	(2)

Managerial career
- Xagħra United
- 2011-2012: Mġarr United
- 2014-2016: Marsaskala
- 2018-2023: Rabat Ajax
- 2023: Gudja United (asst.)
- 2024: St. Andrews
- 2025-: Mellieħa
- * Club domestic league appearances and goals

Vesko Petrović (born 28 December 1965) is a Montenegrin football manager, most recently in charge of Maltese outfit St. Andrews.

He spent a large part of his playing career in Malta, where he played as a striker for several clubs. He played both games for Valletta in the 1996–97 UEFA Cup Winners' Cup but never in the league for them.

== Managerial career ==
Petrović led Maltese third-tier side Mġarr United to promotion in 2012.

Petrović was appointed manager of Marsaskala in summer 2014 and of Rabat Ajax in summer 2018. He was named assistant to head coach Jesmond Zammit at Gudja United in summer 2023, only to move to St. Andrews in January 2024 to steer the club safe from relegation to the third tier.

In June 2025, it was announced that Petrović would take over from Warren Said as manager of the Mellieħa senior football squad for the following season.

== Honours ==
- Maltese Challenge League: 1

1995
