= MKFC =

MKFC may refer to:

- Mdina Knights F.C.
- Melbourne Knights FC
- Mitra Kukar F.C.
- MKFC Stockhkolm College

== See also ==
- Milton Keynes Dons F.C.
