= Maltese Third Division =

Association football league in Malta

- Founded: 2000
- Folded: 2020
- Country: Malta
- Number of clubs: 13
- Level on pyramid: 4
- Promotion to: Maltese Second Division
- Relegation to: none

The Maltese Third Division (also known as the BOV Third Division due to sponsorship reasons) was the lowest league level in Maltese football until 2020 when it was merged with the Maltese Second Division to create the National Amateur League.

== History ==
The league was founded in 2000.

Until 2011 the division comprised two sections - Section A with eleven teams and Section B with eleven teams. Both sections play two rounds with the winner in each group getting promoted to the Maltese Second Division. Relegation play-offs between the 2nd and 3rd placed teams of both groups and the 10th-place finisher of Second Division determined the third team to be in the Second Division.

Because it is the lowest level in the Maltese Football League, there is no formal relegation from the league. However, the two lowest placed teams have to reapply to take part the following season.

For the 2007-08 season, Mtarfa F.C. replaced Ta' Xbiex F.C. (now replaced by Ta' Xbiex S.C.) after their league application was turned down, mainly due to their poor performances over a number of years. New teams can also apply to join the competition. Season 2009-10 saw Swieqi United F.C. joining, and they were followed by Marsascala F.C. in 2010-11.

On January 13, 2011, the Malta Football Association decided to reform the league to 14 teams as from season 2011–12, with the top 3 teams being promoted to the Second Division.

For season 2015–16, the matches were played at the Charles Abela Memorial Stadium in Mosta, Luxol St. Andrews ground in Pembroke and Sirens F.C. ground in San Pawl il-Baħar.

== Season-by-Season ==
Season	Champions	Promoted
2000–01	Msida Saint-Joseph	Senglea Athletic
2001–02	San Ġwann	Vittoriosa Stars
2002–03	Żejtun Corinthians	St. George's
2003–04	Melita	St. Venera Lightnings, Qormi
2004–05	Gudja United	Għargħur
2005–06	Birżebbuġa St. Peter's	St. Venera Lightnings, Rabat Ajax
2006–07	Mgarr United	Sirens, Żurrieq
2007–08	Gozo	Żebbuġ Rangers
2008–09	Gżira United	Għargħur, Żurrieq
2009–10	Żejtun Corinthians	Mġarr United, Naxxar Lions
2010–11	Għargħur	St. Venera Lightnings, Kirkop United
2011–12	Pembroke Athleta	Fgura United
2012–13	Senglea Athletic	Mdina Knights, Marsaskala, Marsa
2013–14	Sirens	Swieqi United
2014–15	Mgarr United	Kirkop United, Qrendi
2015–16	Marsaxlokk	Attard, Għaxaq
2016–17	Kalkara	Luqa St. Andrews, St. Lucia
2017–18	St. Venera Lightnings	Mellieħa
2018–19	Żurrieq	Xgħajra Tornadoes
2019–20	Attard F.C.	Għargħur F.C.
