= Maltese Second Division =

Association football league in Malta

- Organising body: Malta Football Association (MFA)
- Country: Malta
- Number of clubs: 13
- Level on pyramid: 3
- Promotion to: Maltese First Division
- Relegation to: Maltese Third Division
- Domestic cup: FA Trophy
- Current champions: Marsa (2019–20)

The Maltese Second Division (also known as the BOV Second Division due to sponsorship reasons) was the third-highest division in Maltese football until 2020 when it was merged with the Maltese Third Division to create the National Amateur League.

== Structure ==
Thirteen clubs competed in the league, playing each other twice. Teams earned three points for a win, one for a draw, and none for a loss. At the season's end, the top two teams were promoted to the First Division, while the bottom two were relegated to the Third Division. The team finishing third played a play-off against the third-last team from the First Division. The winner secured a place in the latter's next season. The 11th-placed team in this league contested a similar play-off against the third-placed team from the Third Division to determine placement in the following season's Second Division.

== 2018-19 season ==
The following 13 clubs are competing in the Second Division during the 2018–19 season.

Club	Finishing position last season	Location
Birżebbuġa St. Peter's	7th	Birżebbuġa
Fgura United	4th	Fgura
Kalkara	8th	Kalkara
Luqa St. Andrew's	10th	Luqa
Marsaxlokk	6th	Marsaxlokk
Melita	13th (First Division)	St Julian's
Mellieħa	2nd (Third Division)	Mellieħa
Mġarr United	9th	Mġarr
Rabat Ajax	14th (First Division)	Rabat
Siġġiewi	5th	Siġġiewi
St. George's	11th	Cospicua
Żabbar St. Patrick	12th (First Division)	Żabbar
St. Venera Lightnings	1st (Third Division)	Santa Venera

== History ==
Season	Winner	Runner-up	Relegated
2000–01	Mqabba	Balzan Youths	Siġġiewi, St. Lucia
2001–02	Msida Saint-Joseph	Senglea Athletics	St. Venera Lightnings, Melita
2002–03	Tarxien Rainbows	San Ġwann	Qormi, Luqa St. Andrews
2003–04	St. George's	Gozo	Żurrieq, Żejtun Corinthians, Xgħajra Tornadoes
2004–05	Tarxien Rainbows	St. Andrews	St. Venera Lightnings, Rabat Ajax
2005–06	Qormi	Vittoriosa Stars	Gżira United, Attard, Għargħur
2006–07	Dingli Swallows	Mellieħa	Żebbuġ Rangers, Gudja, Gozo
2007–08	San Ġwann	Rabat Ajax	Żurrieq, Sirens
2008–09	Balzan	Melita	Naxxar, Mgarr, Marsa
2009–10	Lija Athletic	St. Andrews	St. Venera Lightnings, Għargħur, Gozo
2010–11	Żejtun Corinthians	Rabat	Senglea Athletic, Gżira United, Mġarr United
2011–12	Gżira United	Gudja United	Attard, Senglea Athletic, Luqa St. Andrews
2012–13	Żebbuġ Rangers	Msida Saint-Joseph	Mġarr United, SantaSt. Venera Lightnings
2013–14	Mqabba	Pembroke Athleta	Marsaskala, Kirkop United, Mdina Knights
2014–15	San Gwann	Hamrun Spartans	Dingli Swallows, Ghaxaq F.C., Xghajra Tornadoes F.C.
2015–16	Marsa	Sirens	Żurrieq, Msida Saint-Joseph, Kirkop United
2016–17	Żejtun Corinthians	Qrendi	Għaxaq, Mellieħa
2017–18	Gudja United	St. Lucia	Attard, Għargħur
2018–19	St. George's	Fgura United	St. Venera Lightnings, Siggiewi
2019–20	Marsa	Marsaxlokk	no relegation
