= National League I (Malta) =

Association football league in Malta

- Founded: 2020 (As National Amateur League)
- Country: Malta (12 teams)
- Number of clubs: 12 (2026-27)
- Level on pyramid: 3
- Promotion to: Maltese Challenge League
- Relegation to: National League II
- Domestic cup: National Cup
- Current champions: Attard (2025–26)
- Website: Home
- Current: 2026–27 National League I

The National League I (referred to as the BOV National League I for sponsorship reasons) is the third-highest division in Maltese football. It replaced the Maltese Second Division and Maltese Third Division during the 2020–21 season following the premature end of the previous football season due to the COVID-19 pandemic.

== Format ==
- 22 clubs: 2020–21
- 19 clubs: 2021–22
- 21 clubs: 2022–23
- 23 clubs: 2023–24
- 16 clubs: 2024–25
- 14 clubs: 2025–26
- 12 clubs: 2026–

Following the merger of the Maltese Second and Third Divisions the league is made up of two groups. Over the course of the season, each team plays twice against the others in their group. Three points are awarded for a win, one for a draw and zero for a loss. The teams are ranked in the table by:

1. Total points gained

In the need of a tie-breaker, a play-off game is played. At the end of the season, the top team from each group is directly promoted to the Challenge League; an additional place is reserved for the winner of the promotion play-offs. The play-offs take place between the clubs that finished second to fourth in each group with the winning team gaining promotion to the Challenge League.

In March 2021, Luqa St. Andrew's became the first champions of the league and were promoted from group stage along with Melita and Mġarr United. They were joined in the 2021-22 Challenge League by the winners of the promotion play-offs Rabat Ajax who had beaten Kirkop United in the final. With five teams being relegated from the Challenge League in 2021, and four being promoted from the Amateur League, the 2021-22 season saw an overall increase of clubs to 23.

The league was rebranded into National League I as from the 2026–27 season.

== Venues ==
National League I (Malta) is located in Malta
Ta' Qali	San Pawl il-Baħar
Centenary Stadium	Sirens Stadium
Capacity: 3,000	Capacity: 800
Pembroke	Mosta
Luxol Stadium	Charles Abela Stadium
Capacity: 700	Capacity: 600

== List of Champions by season ==
Year	Champions	Runner-up	Top-Scorer	Goals
2020–21	Luqa St.Andrew's	Melita	(Malta) Nicholas Schembri (Attard)	15
2021–22	Żurrieq	Attard	(Malta) Nicholas Schembri (Attard)	21
2022–23	Senglea Athletic	Msida St.Joseph	(Nigeria) Christian Saint Ebisindor (Mġarr)	20
2023–24	Mġarr United	Mtarfa	(Malta) Kurt Borg (Mtarfa)	33
2024–25	Birzebbuga St.Peter's	Vittoriosa Stars	(Republic of Ireland) Joshua Olejabi (Marsaskala)	20
2025–26	Attard	(Gozo) Victoria Hotspurs	(Nigeria) Precious Uchechukwu Nwankwo (Attard)	32
2026–27				
