= Għaxaq F.C. =

Maltese football club

Ghaxaq Football Club
- Full name: Ghaxaq Football Club
- Founded: 1950; 76 years ago
- Ground: Ghaxaq Stadium
- Capacity: 300
- Chairman: Mr. Dejan Caruana
- Manager: n/a
- League: National Amateur League
- 2021–22: National Amateur League, Group A, 8th
Home colours	Away colours

Ghaxaq F.C. is a football club from the village of Ghaxaq in south-eastern Malta. Founded in 1950, it currently competes in the Maltese National Amateur League. Ghaxaq F.C. has only made it once to the top division, in the 1979–80 season.

== History ==
Ghaxaq F.C. originated in the summer of 1950 and immediately found their place in the MFA Third Division Championship. They played their first match against Siggiewi on 15 October 1950. It was a promising start since they won the match 2–1. Still, their standing in the championship was always a struggle and the end of the season found them classified in the lower ranks. The following season didn't get any easier. However, they managed to keep their 3rd Division standing till the 1955–56 season, where they had to play a relegation decider against Lija Athletic when they found themselves last place in Section A. Since this game drew 2–2 a replay was scheduled, but for some reason Ghaxaq never showed up and Lija Athletic got the walkover. As a result of all this, Ghaxaq were relegated and their place was taken by Għargħur Excelsior. That was the end of Ghaxaq team. In the early 1960s another amateur team was formed under the name of Ghaxaq Colts, which name was later on changed to Ghaxaq Gazelles.

== Ghaxaq FC back in the '70s ==
Only the minors team represented Ghaxaq in the 1970–71 season. This team once again gave life to the competitive game of football in Ghaxaq. They not only won Section E but also made it to the final of the Minors Cup. They lost 2–0 in the final match against Floriana. However, the players who competed in that match were later on part of the essential formation of the team which gave Ghaxaq much gratification in the following years.

It was in the 1971–72 season that the MFA accepted Ghaxaq's application to take part in the Third Division. This time round Ghaxaq not only did not end up relegated, but five years later they managed to win their place in Second Division for the first time in their team's history.

During 1975–76 season, the team won every prize the Third Division had to offer. Therein, they won the Championship, the Cup, and the Sons Cup of Malta. The 1978–79 Second Division season was dominated by Ghaxaq FC. During that season, Ghaxaq got promoted. Coach Tony Calleja was an important contributor to this success. It was he who lead the relatively new team of Ghaxaq from one success to another in such a short span of time.

The players who featured most in this achievement were brothers Joe and Gwido Aquilina, Leli Cristiano and Joseph Agius. Cristiano, later on became well known with Valletta. As part of the Valletta team he won several honours like Premier league (First Division @ that time) top scorer with the same goals as Leonard(Nardu) Farrugia (15) and can be considered as the most prominent player who came out of Ghaxaq. Joseph Agius also played for Floriana. Ghaxaq only lasted one season in the First Division. Struggling against the best was too difficult. At the end of the season they were relegated and little by little the team slipped to the bottom ranks of the general championship. Since then the team has never reached the 1977–80 levels again.

== The 1990s era ==
It was in the 1994–95 season that Ghaxaq FC was once again promoted from the third division to the second division.

In the following season Ghaxaq continued their march to success. They encountered little opposition in Second Division. In fact, they only lost one match, against Marsaxlokk. The gap between them and the rest of the teams was so wide that they ended the season with a twelve-point advantage over Qormi, who classified second.

In the decider match against Xaghjra Tornadoes, Ghaxaq won 2–1, to become the champions in Second Division. They also did well in the Knock-Out, making it to the final where they then lost 5–2 against Gozo FC.

Ghaxaq's experience in First Division was not only short lived but also an unpleasant one. While Xaghjra Tornadoes, who qualified to First Division at the same time, went on to win the championship and find their place in the Premier League, Ghaxaq FC did exactly the opposite. With just 9 points gained out of 18 matches played, they ended up at the bottom of the final classification and found themselves once again in the Second Division. In the 1997–98 season, they were relegated to the third division.

== Season 2013–14 and Season 2015–16 Promotion to the 2nd Division ==
This season was one of the greats for Ghaxaq F.C. as it saw them gaining promotion from the third division, it was more than a decade since the village of Hal-Ghaxaq saw some movement and celebrations regarding football. This ended the next season as it saw Ghaxaq F.C. relegated again in the third division. However, Ghaxaq managed to bounce back and clinch promotion back to the Second Division during the 2015–2016 season.

== Current squad ==
Note: Flags indicate national team as defined under FIFA eligibility rules; some limited exceptions apply. Players may hold more than one non-FIFA nationality.

No.	Pos.	Nation	Player
1	GK	MLT	Ludvic Fardell
1	GK	MLT	Janson Chetcuti
2	DF	MLT	Kenneth Spiteri
3	DF	MLT	Mario Bajada
4	DF	MLT	Bronen Bugeja
5	DF	MLT	Elton Dimech (captain)
6	DF	MLT	Noel Bilocca
7	DF	MLT	Joseph Meilak
8	MF	MLT	Martin Busuttil
9	MF	MLT	Emmanuel Cutajar

No.	Pos.	Nation	Player
10	MF	MLT	Matthew Cassar
12	MF	MLT	Dean Aguis
13	MF	ROU	Florin Anton
14	MF	MLT	Ronald Spina
15	MF	MLT	Ian Cutajar
17	FW	MLT	Nicolai Martin Borg
18	FW	MLT	Franrich Schembri
19	FW	MLT	Kersten Borg
—			

== Statistics ==
The recent season-by-season performance of the club:

Season	Division	Tier	Position
1998-99	Maltese Second Division	III	7th
1999-00	Maltese Second Division	III	13th ↓
2000-01	Maltese Third Division	IV	11th
2002-03	Maltese Third Division	IV	11th
2004-05	Maltese Third Division	IV	7th
2005-06	Maltese Third Division	IV	12th
2006-07	Maltese Third Division	IV	9th
2007-08	Maltese Third Division	IV	9th
2008-09	Maltese Third Division	IV	4th
2011-12	Maltese Third Division	IV	4th
2012-13	Maltese Third Division	IV	12th
2013-14	Maltese Third Division	IV	3rd ↑
2014-15	Maltese Second Division	III	13th ↓
2015-16	Maltese Third Division	IV	3rd ↑
2016-17	Maltese Second Division	III	14th ↓
2017-18	Maltese Third Division	IV	7th
2018-19	Maltese Third Division	IV	8th
2019-20	Maltese Third Division	IV	6th ↑
2020-21	Maltese Amateur League	III	8th
2021-22	Maltese Amateur League	III	7th
2022-23	Maltese Amateur League	III	7th
2023-24	Maltese Amateur League	III	9th ↓

- With the introduction of the Maltese Amateur League in 2020, all clubs in the Maltese Third Division moved 1 tier up.

Key

↑Promoted	↓ Relegated
