= Żurrieq F.C. =

Maltese football club

Zurrieq Football Club
- Full name: Żurrieq Football Club
- Nickname: The Reds
- Founded: 16 May 1949; 76 years ago
- Ground: Żurrieq Football Ground
- Capacity: 100
- Chairman: Dino Bonnici
- Manager: Brian Spiteri
- League: Maltese Challenge League
- 2024–25: 6th
Home colours	Away colours

Żurrieq Football Club is a Maltese football club based in Żurrieq, Malta. The club currently plays in the Maltese Challenge League. They also play in the annual Maltese FA Trophy.

== European History ==
In 1982, Żurrieq F.C. took part in the first round of the 1982–83 UEFA Cup. Their debut was against HNK Hajduk Split, losing 4–1 and 4–0. Three years later they played the first round in the 1985–86 European Cup Winners' Cup against FC Bayer Uerdingen 05, losing 3–0 and 9–0. The next year they played in the first round of the 1986–87 European Cup Winners' Cup against Wrexham, losing 3–0 and 4–0.

== Honours ==
=== Domestic ===
- Maltese FA Trophy (Malta Cup)
  - Winners (1) 1985
  - Runners-up (2) 1984, 1986
- Maltese Third Division
  - Winners (1): 2019
- National Amateur League
  - Winners (1): 2022

== Players ==
=== Current squad ===
Note: Flags indicate national team as defined under FIFA eligibility rules; some limited exceptions apply. Players may hold more than one non-FIFA nationality.

No.	Pos.	Nation	Player
94	GK	MLT	Jurgen Borg
1	GK	USA	Natan Stone
12	GK	MLT	Luke Cocker
3	DF	MLT	Mauro Bonnici (Captain)
96	DF	MLT	Shawn Darmanin
5	DF	NGA	Chibueze Glamor Eziefula
99	DF	MLT	Darren Borg
87	DF	MLT	Steve Bezzina
7	DF	MLT	Owden Vella
33	DF	MLT	Anton Camilleri

No.	Pos.	Nation	Player
77	MF	MLT	Kurt Chircop
88	MF	MLT	Jean Buttigieg
22	MF	MLT	Jamie Zerafa
18	MF	MLT	Larens Vella
8	MF	MLT	Emerson Camilleri
17	MF	MLT	Eric Atkins
11	MF	BRA	Anderson De Barros
19	MF	MLT	Xylon Portelli
9	FW	LBR	Mamd Bah Sulahmana Mamadu
25	FW	MLT	Brite Ihuomah
23	FW	NGA	Precious Tenebe

== Player records ==
=== Top five most appearances of all-time ===
Rank.	Player	Period	Apps
1	(Malta) Mario Farrugia	1972–87	354
2	(Malta) Louis Cutajar	1979-91	322
3	(Malta) Karl Sacco	2004-15; 2018-20	237
4	(Malta) Darren Bellizzi	2000s	222
5	(Malta) Jason Saliba	2000s	220

=== Top five scorers of all-time ===
Rank.	Player	Period	Goals
1	(Malta) Mario Farrugia	1972–87	52
2	(Malta) Godfrey Chetcuti	2000s	50
3	(Malta) Aldrin Muscat	1990–95	49
4	(Malta) Daniel Zammit	2012–19	46
5	(Bulgaria) Nikolai Kirilov	1999–05	45

== Current board ==
=== Żurrieq F.C. Committee ===
Position	Name
President	Dino Bonnici
General Secretary	Norbert Fenech
Asst. Secretary	Sandro Sammut
Treasurer	Victor Galea
Asst. Treasurer	Michael Calleja
Members	Sandro Sammut, Anthony Camilleri, Jeffrey Camilleri, Michael Calleja, David Bugeja, Fiona Galea, Noel Buhagiar, George Caruana
Financial Director	Manuel D'Amato
V.Presidents	Julian Galea / Rita Grima

== Statistics ==
=== Domestic ===
The recent season-by-season performance of the club:

Season	Division	Tier	Position
1993-94	Maltese Premier League	I	6th
1994-95	Maltese Premier League	I	7th
1995-96	Maltese Premier League	I	10th ↓
1996-97	Maltese First Division	II	5th
1998-99	Maltese First Division	II	2nd ↑
1999-00	Maltese Premier League	I	10th ↓
2000-01	Maltese First Division	II	10th ↓
2001-02	Maltese Second Division	III	4th
2002-03	Maltese Second Division	III	4th
2003-04	Maltese Second Division	III	10th ↓
2004-05	Maltese Third Division	IV	11th
2005-06	Maltese Third Division	IV	6th
2006-07	Maltese Third Division	IV	3rd ↑
2007-08	Maltese Second Division	III	11th ↓
2008-09	Maltese Third Division	IV	2nd ↑
2009-10	Maltese Second Division	III	8th
2010-11	Maltese Second Division	III	9th
2011-12	Maltese Second Division	III	10th
2012-13	Maltese Second Division	III	3rd ↑
2013-14	Maltese First Division	II	9th
2014-15	Maltese First Division	II	12th ↓
2015-16	Maltese Second Division	III	13th ↓
2016-17	Maltese Third Division	IV	9th
2017-18	Maltese Third Division	IV	9th
2018-19	Maltese Third Division	IV	1st ↑
2019-20	Maltese Second Division	III	7th
2020-21	Maltese Amateur League	III	2nd
2021-22	Maltese Amateur League	III	1st ↑
2022-23	Maltese Challenge League	II	5th
2023-24	Maltese Challenge League	II	6th

=== Europe ===
Season	Competition	Round	Country	Club	Home	Away	Agg.
1982–83	UEFA Cup	1R	(Socialist Federal Republic of Yugoslavia)	Hajduk Split	1–4	0–4	1–8
1985–86	UEFA Cup Winners' Cup	1R	(West Germany)	KFC Uerdingen 05	0–3	0–9	0–12
1986–87	UEFA Cup Winners' Cup	1R	(Wales)	Wrexham	0–3	0–4	0–7
