= Mellieħa S.C. =

Maltese sports club

Mellieħa
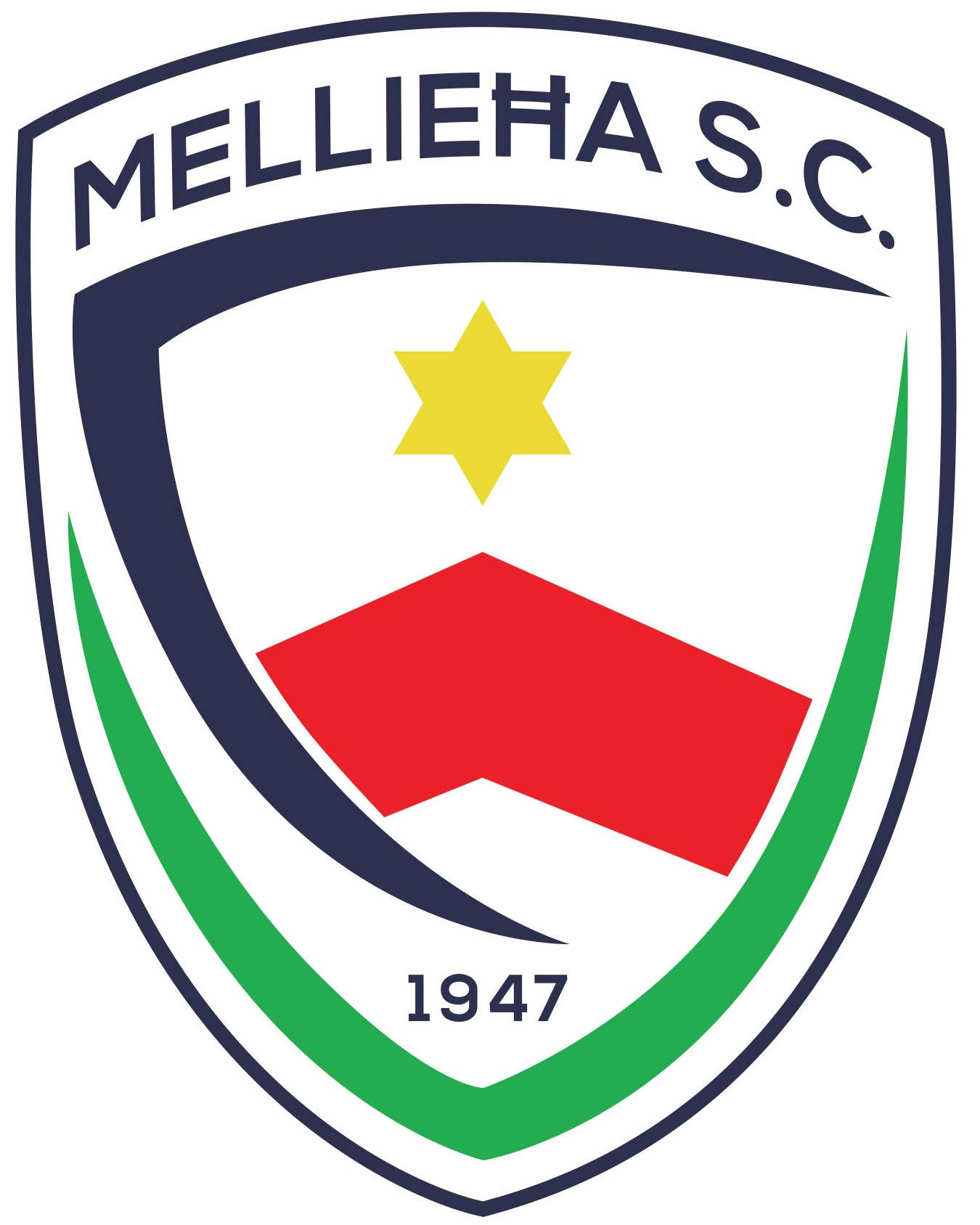
- Full name: Mellieħa Sports Club
- Nickname: The Boys in Blue
- Founded: 1947; 79 years ago
- Ground: Mellieħa Sports Complex
- Chairman: Alfred Vella Borg
- Manager: Vesko Petrović
- League: Maltese National League
- 2025-26: National Amateur League, 8th of 14
- Website: melliehasportsclub.org
Home colours	Away colours

Mellieħa Sports Club is a semi-professional sports club based in the town of Mellieħa, Malta, which competes in the Maltese National Amateur League. Founded in 1947, the sports club has departments in football, baseball & softball, netball and snooker.

== History ==
Mellieħa S.C. began as a football club in 1947 and has competed ever since. Their most notable achievement happened in 1992 when they finished runners-up in the Maltese First Division, which earned them a promotion to the Premier League, the top-tier in Maltese football. They were relegated the following season and have not returned to the top tier since. For the 2020–21 season, they competed in the National Amateur League, finishing 4th in group A before being knocked out in the first round of the promotion play-offs.

In 2022, La Liga club, Valencia CF, announced that they were becoming a technical partner with Mellieħa S.C. to develop the Maltese club's football school to after the two clubs participated in a VCF Soccer Camp held in Italy three years earlier.

Mellieħa S.C will play in the National Amateur League in the 2025-26 season. In June 2025, it was announced that Vesko Petrović would take over from Warren Said as manager of the senior football squad for the following season.

== Futsal ==
Mellieħa S.C. also had a futsal team, which participated in Malta's top futsal league until 2024. The 2021–22 season was the last edition of the Enemed Futsal League in which Mellieha FC Futsal participated, finishing 5th out of 11 teams, earning a spot in the Second stage where they finished at the bottom of the table with 18 points.

In the quarter-final of the 2021–22 edition of the E&L Futsal Trophy, Mellieħa was defeated 2–14 by University of Malta. In the 2021–22 futsal cup, Mellieħa reached the First round, defeating 7–1 Msida, then losing to Ħamrun.

Currently, only the youth team exists, even producing players for the under-17 and under-19 teams of the national team.

== Current squad ==
As of 7 April 2025

Note: Flags indicate national team as defined under FIFA eligibility rules; some limited exceptions apply. Players may hold more than one non-FIFA nationality.

No.	Pos.	Nation	Player
1	GK	MLT	Anthony Curmi
2	DF	MLT	Warren Vella
4	DF	MLT	Wayne Chetcuti
5	DF	MLT	Jake Saliba
6	MF	MLT	Ismael Borg
7	MF	MLT	Leon Theuma
8	MF	MLT	Jacob Farrugia
9	FW	MLT	Malcolm Vella Vidal
9	FW	LBY	Layth Saeb Kuwafi
10	FW	MLT	Michael Camilleri
11	MF	MLT	Mirco Vella
12	GK	MLT	Mark Cutajar
13	FW	NGA	Tejumola Ebenezer Ayorinde
14	DF	MLT	Iven Zammit

No.	Pos.	Nation	Player
15	DF	MLT	Sasa Glumac
16	MF	NGA	Edafe Christopher Uzeh
17	MF	MLT	Alexander Akl
18	DF	MLT	Christian Grech
19	FW	CIV	Marc Bolane Kakou Adonis
20	DF	MLT	Matthias Vella
21	MF	NGA	Daniel Oluwatobi Ighalo
22	MF	MLT	Cody Baguley
23	FW	MLT	Craig Cilia
23	GK	MLT	Daniel Tonna
24	DF	MLT	Dylan Douglas Camilleri
25	DF	MLT	Liam Spiteri
25	FW	MLT	Isaac Schembri
26	GK	MLT	James Magro

== Player records ==
=== Appearances and goalscoring ===
- Most appearances: Ray Vella, 377+ (no exact records held); Kevin Gauci, 383
- Record goal scorer: Wayne Borg St. John, 159 in 317 games (2000–2016)
- Most goals in one season: Wayne Borg St. John, 22 (2009–10)
- Oldest player ever: Ray Vella, 46 years

=== Player of the Year ===
The following is a table of Player of the Year winners from 1961 to 2024:

- (Malta) Joe Borg (1961–62)
- (Malta) Edwin Vella (1962–63)
- (Malta) John Calleja (1963–64)
- (Malta) Kristinu Grima (1964–65)
- (Malta) Grezzju Grech (1965–66)
- (Malta) Charlie Abela (1966–67)
- (Malta) Joe Cauchi (1967–68)
- (Malta) Salvu Vella (1969–70)
- (Malta) Alfred Fenech (1970–71)
- (Malta) Anthony Borg (1971–72)
- (Malta) Alfred Vella Borg (1972–73)
- (Malta) Charlie Grima (1973–74)
- (Malta) Frans Vella (1989–90)
- (Malta) Ralph Farrugia (1990–91)
- (Malta) Stephen Deguara (1991–92)
- (Malta) Kevin Gambin (1993–94)
- (Malta) Ray Vella (1994–95)
- (Malta) Keith Fenech (1995–96)
- (Malta) Kevin Gambin (1996–97)
- (Libya) Kamal Edgeli (1997–98)
- (Malta) William Borg (1998–99)
- (Malta) Kevin Gambin (1999–2000)
- (Malta) Kevin Gauci (2000–01)
- (Malta) Joseph Mercieca (2001–02)
- (Malta) Kevin Gauci (2002–03)
- (Malta) Wayne Borg St. John (2003–04)
- (Malta) Wayne Borg St. John (2004–05)
- (Malta) William Borg (2005–06)
- (Malta) Wayne Borg St. John (2006–07)
- (Malta) Kevin Gauci (2007–08)
- (Malta) David Fenech (2008–09)
- (Malta) Luke Cauchi (2009–10)
- (Malta) Matthew Vella (2010–11)
- (Malta) Philip Taylor (2011–12)
- (Malta) Matthew Abela (2012–13)
- (Malta) David Cauchi (2013–14)
- (Malta) Jake Farrugia (2014–15)
- (Malta) James Abela (2015–16)
- (Malta) Jack Vella (2017–18)
- (Malta) Jake Farrugia (2018–19)
- (Malta) Jake Farrugia (2020–21)
- (Malta) Malcolm Vella Vidal (2022–23)
- (Nigeria) Christopher Edafe Uzeh (2023–24)

== Managers ==
- (Malta) Tony Pepperoni (1967–70)
- (Malta) Alfred Bartolo (1974–76)
- (Malta) Frankie Zammit (1976–77)
- (Malta) Carmel Bartolo (1977–78)
- (Malta) John Calleja (1978–80)
- (Malta) John Buttiġieġ (1980–81)
- (Malta) John Calleja (1981–82)
- (Malta) Selection Board (1982–83)
- (Malta) Salvu Vella (1983–84)
- (Malta) Charlie Grima & (Malta) Charlie Fenech (1984–85)
- (Malta) George Micallef (1985–88)
- (Malta) Dennis Fenech (1988–94)
- (Malta) Freddie Cardona (1994–96)
- (Malta) Euchar Grech & (Albania) Nefail Zhejani (1996–97)
- (Malta) Dennis Fenech (1997–99)
- (Malta) Ronald Vella (1999–2002)
- (Albania) Ilir Pelinku (2002–04)
- (Malta) Dennis Fenech (2004–05)
- (Albania) Ilir Pelinku (2005–08)
- (Malta) Ronald Vella (2008–09)
- (Malta) Kevin Gambin & (Bulgaria) Nikolay Filipov (2009–11)
- (Malta) JoJo Bajada (2011–12)
- (Malta) Alex Delia (2012–13)
- (Malta) Dennis Fenech (2013–15)
- (Malta) Brian Bartolo (2015–16)
- (Serbia) Vojko Martinović & (Malta) Alex Delia (2016–17)
- (Malta) Alex Delia (2017–18)
- (Malta) Brian Bartolo (2018–2021)
- (Malta) Antoine Camilleri (2022–2023)
- (Malta) Warren Said (2024-2025)
- (Montenegro) Vesko Petrović (2025–present)

== Honours ==
=== League ===
- First Division

Runners-up (1): 1991–92

- Second Division

Winners (1): 1990–91
Runners-up (1): 2006–07

- Third Division

Winners (2): 1961–62, 1988–89
Runners-up (1): 2017–18

- Fourth Division

Winners (1): 1975–76

=== Cup ===
- Second/Third Division FA Cup

Winners (1): 2003–04

- Fourth Division Cup

Winners (1): 1978–79

- Christmas Cup

Winners (1): 1972–73
