= San Ġwann F.C. =

Maltest association football club

San Ġwann
- Full name: San Ġwann Football Club
- Nickname: Saints
- Founded: 1972; 54 years ago
- Ground: San Ġwann Football Ground.
- Chairman: Jason Borg
- Manager: Xavier Saliba
- League: Maltese National Amateur League
- 2025-26: 6th
Home colours	Away colours	Third colours

San Ġwann Football Club is a Maltese football club from the urban town of San Ġwann, which currently plays in the Maltese Challenge League.

== History ==
Former crest of San Ġwann F.C.

The club was founded in 1949 as St. John F.C. when San Ġwann was known as Imsierah but later became known as San Ġwann F.C. The area in San Ġwann where the club is found is known as Tal-Gharghar. The team's colors are yellow and blue. San Ġwann footballers are known as the Saints.

== Futsal ==
San Ġwann F.C. had a fielded a futsal team that competed in the Maltese Futsal League until 2019.
