= Żejtun Corinthians F.C. =

Maltese football club

- Full name: Żejtun Corinthians Football Club
- Founded: 1944; 82 years ago
- President: Joseph Gauci
- Manager: Rodney Bugeja
- League: Maltese Challenge League
- 2021–22: Maltese Challenge League, Group A, 3rd
- Website: www.zejtunfc.com
Home colours	Away colours

Żejtun Corinthians Football Club is a Maltese football club from the town of Żejtun, which currently plays in the Maltese Challenge League.

== History ==
After World War II, the game of football in Malta was re-enacted, falling under the responsibility of the Malta Football Association. Like other local villages and towns, the Żejtun population eagerly set up a football team, and in 1943 the name of Żejtun Corinthians first emerged. The team's name was chosen from a football team taking part in the English league. The first committee members of the football club consisted of Joseph Cassar (Club President), Joseph Galea (Vice President), Fortunato Zerafa (General Secretary), and Grazio Cassar, (Treasurer). The official colours of the club's kit are navy blue and sky blue stripes. This colour scheme was first inspired by that of Sliema Wanderers, since at the time many ‘Zwieten' supported Sliema Wanderers.

The first decade proved to be a good start for Żejtun Corinthians. The players forming part of the football team were either Żejtun locals, or sportsmen from the vicinities. In the first seasons, Żejtun Corinthians placed in the lower divisions of the league. However, thanks to the team's hard work, Żejtun Corinthians managed to secure honours in the leagues organized by the Malta Football Association in a couple of years. Since then, the team reached its highest placing in the 1960s when a rank in the Second Division was meritoriously secured. This was the golden era of Żejtun Corinthians with players like Louis Bonello, Reginald Vella James, Anthony Spiteri, Joe Abela and goalkeeper John Formosa. During the 1959/60 season, Żejtun Corinthians won the double, placing first in the Maltese Third Division classification and the Knockout competition.

During the 1970s the team also had its share of successes. After winning the Maltese Third Division multiple times, Żejtun Corinthians reached the Maltese Second Division. In the 1980, the Malta Football Association reorganized the National Leagues and for the first time introduced the Maltese Premier League. In the 1981/82, and the following three consecutive seasons, 1986/87, 1987/88, and 1988/89, Żejtun Corinthians proudly played in the Maltese First Division.

In the early 1990s history repeated itself, in the season 1991/92 Żejtun Corinthians won the Maltese Third Division championship with a stunning win in a derby decider over Marsaxlokk. In the season 2002/03 Żejtun Corinthians were declared Champions for the Maltese Third Division, with a prestigious win over eternal rivals St. George's under the presidency of Ludwig Camilleri. The last honour club won was in season 2016/2017 Club won the Second Division Championship.

During the 2020–21 season, the club won promotion to Maltese Premier League after finishing top of the table when the league was suspended due to the COVID outbreak.

== Futsal ==
Żejtun Corinthians F.C. returns to the Maltese Futsal League starting from 2025 under the name Żejtun Corinthians Futsal WA.
