= Mdina Knights F.C. =

Maltese football club

Mdina Knights
- Full name: Mdina Knights Football Club
- Nickname: The Knights
- Founded: 2006; 20 years ago
- Ground: Centenary Stadium, Ta' Qali, Malta
- Capacity: 5,000
- Manager: Roland Sollars
- League: National Amateur League
- 2021–22: National Amateur League, Group B, 5th
- Website: http://www.mdinaknightsfc.com/
Home colours	Away colours

Mdina Knights F.C. is an association football club representing Malta's former capital city, Mdina, currently playing in the Maltese National Amateur League B. The club is the smallest in Malta and represents a town of approximately 250 residents. They also play in the annual Maltese FA Trophy.

== Executive committee ==
Position	Name
President:	David Wallbank
General Secretary:	Raymond Formosa
Treasurer:	Glen Attard

== Technical staff ==
- Head Coach: Roland Sollars
- Assistant Coach: Ray Formosa
- Team Manager: Marco Buttigieg
- Kit Manager: Joe Muscat

== Statistics ==
The recent season-by-season performance of the club:

Season	Division	Tier	Position
2006-07	Maltese Third Division	IV	12th
2007-08	Maltese Third Division	IV	4th
2008-09	Maltese Third Division	IV	2nd
2011-12	Maltese Third Division	IV	6th
2012-13	Maltese Third Division	IV	2nd ↑
2013-14	Maltese Second Division	III	14th ↓
2014-15	Maltese Third Division	IV	10th
2015-16	Maltese Third Division	IV	5th
2016-17	Maltese Thrd Division	IV	8th
2017-18	Maltese Third Division	IV	6th
2018-19	Maltese Third Division	IV	4th
2019-20	Maltese Third Division	IV	9th ↑
2020-21	Maltese Amateur League	III	7th
2021-22	Maltese Amateur League	III	5th
2022-23	Maltese Amateur League	III	10th
2023-24	Maltese Amateur League	III	12th ↓

- With the introduction of the Maltese Amateur League in 2020, all clubs in the Maltese Third Division moved 1 tier up.
