= Mtarfa F.C. =

Maltese football club

- Full name: Mtarfa Football Club
- Founded: 2006; 19 years ago
- Ground: Mtarfa Ground
- Manager: Ludvig Bartolo
- League: Maltese Challenge League
- 2023–24: Maltese National Amateur League Group A,1st (promoted)

Mtarfa F.C. is a football club from Mtarfa, the home of a former big British forces barracks area in central Malta. Founded in 2006, the club took part for the first time in their history in the 2007/2008 season. They entered the Malta Football Association in lieu of Ta' Xbiex S.C., who lost their status due consistently poor results in the lowest of Maltese divisions. They will play in the Maltese Challenge League. They also play in the annual Maltese FA Trophy.

== Achievements ==
Mtarfa reclaimed the Strickland Cup on January 3, 2012, after a game against Marsaskala. Mtarfa FC, for the second consecutive year are champions of the Roger Strickland cup after defeating Marsascala

Mtarfa F.C. is the Maltese football club representing the locality of Mtarfa. The idea to develop a new football club generates from a small group of football enthusiast. Founder and first President Joseph Vassallo together with the first committee in 2006 founded the MTARFA FOOTBALL CLUB. The official kit colours were extracted from the locality's flag – Yellow and Green Striped shirt for the first gear, and White with Blue as the second Gear. The Club logo was selected during an open competition and it was chosen that of Mr. Joseph Galea,

In 2007 the club was recognised and affiliated with the Malta Football Association, given the right to compete in the Malta National League, third Division League. First coach was Mr. Joe Borg and inauguration match was against Melita FC.

The club anthem was written and composed by Mr. Joseph Mary Mifsud

The Mtarfa Youth Nursery was founded with Joseph Vassallo, Ian Sansone and Paul Mifsud formed the first committee and in charge of the young age group.

The demand from players to register with the club forced the committee to increased more age categories and trainers . The 2009 was formed two new categories the U/19 coached by Angelo Borg and the U/15 coached by William Galea. The U/13 coached by Ian Sansone and the U/11 coached by Anton Francalanza, all these coaches wrote their name in the club History as the First trainers to coach in these categories.

The club achieved the first artificial synthetic Nursery Ground in the parameters of the ex Royal Navy Bruce Hospitals and a Club House in the centre of Mtarfa. -->

== Current squad ==
Note: Flags indicate national team as defined under FIFA eligibility rules; some limited exceptions apply. Players may hold more than one non-FIFA nationality.

No. / Pos. / Nation / Player	No. / Pos. / Nation / Player

== Club Officials and Coaching Staff ==
- President: Angelo Borg
- Vice President: Paul Mifsud

Senior Coach Ludvig Bartolo

U15s Head Coach Adrian Lanzon.
