= Mġarr United F.C. =

Maltese football club

Mġarr United
- Founded: 1967; 59 years ago
- Ground: Mgarr Stadium, Mgarr, Malta
- Capacity: 500
- Chairman: Manuel Zarb
- Manager: Brian Spiteri
- League: Challenge League
- 2023-24: Maltese National Amateur League, Group B, 1st (promoted)
- Website: https://www.mgarrutd.com/
Home colours	Away colours

Mġarr United F.C. is a Maltese Football Club, based in the small village of Mġarr. The club was founded in 1967 following the dissolution of Mġarr Eagles F.C. The club's first success came in 2006–2007 when they won the BOV Third Division. In 2018–2019 the club managed to reach the Second Division play off final but lost to Vittoriosa Stars 3–2 in extra time. They were relegated after finishing 10th in the Maltese Challenge League B and played in the Maltese National Amateur League in the 2022–23 and 2023-24 seasons. They were promoted back to the Maltese Challenge League at the end of the 2023-24 season.

== Current squad ==
As of 1 March 2026

Note: Flags indicate national team as defined under FIFA eligibility rules; some limited exceptions apply. Players may hold more than one non-FIFA nationality.

No.	Pos.	Nation	Player
-	GK	MLT	Jonathan Debono
-	GK	MLT	Jacob Chirchop St.John
-	GK	MLT	Miguel Chetcuti
-	DF	MLT	Sean Schembri
-	DF	FRA	Matheo Theodose
-	DF	BOL	Lázaro Crescencio
-	DF	MLT	Daniel Sant
-	DF	MLT	Ivin Farrugia
-	DF	FRA	Florian Drif
-	DF	MLT	Daniel Zarb
-	DF	MLT	Connor Zammit
-	DF	USA	Lucas Munroe
-	DF	MLT	Luke Farrugia
-	DF	MLT	Jonathan Bajada

No.	Pos.	Nation	Player
-	MF	MLT	Kyle Frendo
-	MF	MLT	Matthias Fenech
-	MF	MLT	Matthew Mifsud
-	MF	MLT	Joseph Paul Zammit
-	MF	MLT	Arziel Borg
-	MF	MLT	Jurgen Debono
-	MF	MLT	Sean Agius
-	MF	MLT	Peter Xuereb
-	FW	MLT	Zen Galea
-	FW	SEN	Abdou Ndoye
-	FW	MLT	Terence Vella
-	FW	BRA	Cristhyan
-	FW	BRA	Ronaldo Cruz
-	FW	NGR	Wisdom Igiebor
