= Attard F.C. =

Maltese football club

Attard F.C
- Full name: Attard Football Club
- Nickname: Seraċini
- Founded: 1974; 52 years ago
- Stadium: Attard Football Ground
- Capacity: >1500
- Manager: Ivan Zammit
- League: Maltese National Amateur League
- 2024–25: Maltese National Amateur League, 6th of 16
Home colours	Away colours

Attard Football Club is a Maltese association football club from the village of Attard, Malta. They currently play in the Maltese National Amateur League I. The club was founded in 1974. The clubs main kit colours are red and black.The club are nicknamed Seracini.

== History ==
Although Attard FC as a club, were only formed in 1974, early attempts were done to introduce football in the small village of Attard. In fact, Attard United were quite successful between 1935 and 1940, climbing up to the second tier of the Maltese football pyramid in no-time, with two successive promotions in the years 1937 and 1938. However, the current Attard FC was not formed until after the second World War and it took until 1974 before a group of local football enthusiasts founded the current club. The club has now been operating for over 50 seasons in the MFA competitions, with as highlight the 3rd Division Championships in 1999, on their 25th anniversary, and 2020.

== Current squad ==
As of 20 March 2025

Note: Flags indicate national team as defined under FIFA eligibility rules; some limited exceptions apply. Players may hold more than one non-FIFA nationality.

No.	Pos.	Nation	Player
1	GK	MLT	Miguel Caruana
2	DF	MLT	Aidan Tabone Mangion
3	DF	MLT	Matthias Pace Mallia
4	DF	MLT	Enriques Fenech
5	DF	MLT	Nick Ghio
6	MF	MLT	Fabian Zammit
7	MF	MLT	Yanis Tonna
8	MF	MLT	Dale Joseph Ellul
10	FW	MLT	Lydon Cuschieri
11	MF	MLT	Nigel Spiteri
14		MLT	Josmar Galea
15		MLT	Gabriel Coleiro

No.	Pos.	Nation	Player
16		MLT	David Azzopardi
17		ALB	Bledi Alla
18		MLT	Nicolai Sammut
20		FRA	Leonard Blanchard
23		MLT	Luca Martinelli
24		MLT	Kieran Xuereb
28		COL	Esquivel Sebastian Perdomo
29	GK	MLT	Mattias Andrei Fenech
31		MLT	Nicholas Schembri
33		MLT	Jed Valletta
93	GK	MLT	Roderick Camilleri

== Honours ==
- BOV Third Division: 1998-99,2019–20
