= St. Lucia F.C. =

Maltese football club

Santa Lucia Football Club
- Full name: Santa Lucia Football Club
- Founded: 1974; 52 years ago
- Ground: Santa Lucia Football Pitch
- Capacity: 800
- President: Nemanja Lajovic
- Manager: Liam Mangion
- League: Maltese Challenge League
- 2025–26: Maltese Challenge League, 11th
- Website: https://santaluciafc.com/
Home colours	Away colours

Santa Lucia Football Club is a football club from the urban locality of Santa Luċija in southern Malta.

== History ==
Santa Lucia Football Club was founded in 1974. In 2019, the club won promotion to the Maltese Premier League for the first time in its history.

The club's biggest rivals are Tarxien Rainbows, Gudja United, Sirens, and Valletta F.C.

== Futsal ==
Santa Lucia Football Club had a fielded a futsal team that last competed in the Maltese Futsal League-system until 2014, finishing the knockout competition in the first round.

== Players ==
=== Current squad ===
As of 1 March 2026 Note: Flags indicate national team as defined under FIFA eligibility rules; some limited exceptions apply. Players may hold more than one non-FIFA nationality.

No.	Pos.	Nation	Player
1	GK	MLT	Maverick Buhagiar
3	DF	MLT	Alessio Azzopardi
5	DF	MKD	Andrej Kirovski
6	MF	MLT	Jamie Sixsmith
7	FW	MLT	Aidan Friggieri
8	MF	MKD	Rinor Ajdini
9	FW	MLT	Sean Gatt
10	FW	BRA	Jean Carlos
11	DF	MLT	Jamie Nicholl
12	GK	MLT	Miguel Montfort
13	GK	MLT	Christopher Farrugia
14	MF	MLT	Jordie Baraja

No.	Pos.	Nation	Player
15	DF	MLT	Adrian Borg
16	MF	MLT	Mathias Vella
17	DF	MLT	Julian Abela
18	MF	MLT	Julian Casha
19	FW	MLT	Jake Cordina
20	FW	MLT	Jed Valletta
21	DF	MLT	Dylan Mangion
25	DF	MLT	Mousstafa Malool
28	MF	FRA	Mathieu Valbuena (captain)
29	FW	MKD	Filip Petkovski
42	MF	MLT	Bahri Hanan
70	MF	MLT	Shalon Diancono
-	MF	JPN	Masaaki Takahara
