= Luqa St. Andrew's F.C. =

Maltese football club

Luqa St. Andrew's
- Full name: Luqa St. Andrew's Football Club
- Nickname: Saints or Reds
- Founded: 1934; 92 years ago
- Ground: SVDP Ground, Ħal Luqa, Malta
- Chairman: Dr Evan Camilleri
- Manager: Neville Galea
- League: National Amateur League
- 2021–22: Maltese Challenge League, Group B, 11th (relegated)
Home colours	Away colours

Luqa St. Andrew's Football Club are a Maltese football club from the south-western town of Luqa in Malta. Founded in 1934, the club currently competing in the Maltese National Amateur League, becoming champions after winning both championship play-off matches. In seasons 2010–11 and 2016–2017 the team was promoted to the Second Division from the Maltese Third Division. The team is also known by the nickname "Reds".

== Current squad ==
As of 26 March 2025

Note: Flags indicate national team as defined under FIFA eligibility rules; some limited exceptions apply. Players may hold more than one non-FIFA nationality.

No.	Pos.	Nation	Player
1	GK	MLT	Dunstan Zarb
2	DF	MLT	Zack Mangion
3	DF	MLT	Jake Stensen
4	DF	MLT	Kyle Mercieca
6	MF	SYR	Mohamed Chikh Ali
7	MF	MLT	Lydon Sciberras
8	MF	MLT	Thomas Francis Grech
9	FW	GHA	Sherif Mohammed Iddrisu
10	FW	MLT	Bydasser Sammut
11	MF	COD	Jaziel Mulongo Kambale
12	GK	MLT	Aiden Portelli
13		SRI	Mario Jude Dominicius
14		MLT	Edward Bugeja

No.	Pos.	Nation	Player
15		MLT	Jack Degabriele
16		MLT	Dario Aquilina
17		MLT	Andreas Psaila
18		MLT	Nathan Frendo
21		MLT	Josuel Spiteri
22		MLT	Jake Peplow
23		GHA	Fred Kessie
25	MF	MLT	Keiran Pace
45		MLT	Giovanni Galea
51		MLT	Matthew Bonnici
77		MLT	Andrea Azzopardi
98		MLT	Julian Muscat
99	GK	MLT	Justin Tonna

== Honours ==
- Maltese National Amateur League

Winners (1): 2020–21

== Club officials ==
- President: Evan Camilleri
- Vice President: Carmelino Martinelli
- Secretary: Godfrey Borg
- Treasurer: Nathanael Falzon
- Assistant Treasurer: Alfred Cauchi
- Youth Nursery Chairman: Carmel Muscat
