= Xgħajra Tornados F.C. =

Maltese football club

Xgħajra Tornados
- Full name: Xgħajra Tornados Football Club
- Founded: 1985; 41 years ago
- Ground: Xgħajra Tornados Ground
- Manager: Keith Darmanin
- League: National Amateur League
Home colours	Away colours

Xgħajra Tornados F.C. is a football club from Xgħajra, Malta. The team was founded in 1985, and joined the Malta Football Association in 1994.

Most notably, the Tornados took part in the Maltese Premier League in 1997 and 2000. Their first outing in the Premier League was in the 1997–98 season, where they beat the Pietà Hotspurs 1–0. They finished as runners up in the 1st Division in 2000 which gave them promotion, this would be their second and last season in the club's history they played Premier league football as they were relegated with only 2 points from 2 draws with Rabat Ajax, and they haven't been in the top flight since.

== Squad (2025) ==
Note: Flags indicate national team as defined under FIFA eligibility rules; some limited exceptions apply. Players may hold more than one non-FIFA nationality.

No.	Pos.	Nation	Player
2	DF	MLT	Dylan Mifsud
4	DF	MLT	Carl Magro
5	DF	MLT	Miguel Galea
8	MF	JAM	Raylon Kaylon Paisley
9	FW	MLT	Kenneth Abela
11	MF	MLT	Larson Borg
13		MLT	Cheyzen Spagnol
17		MLT	Dario Borg
18		MLT	Michael Scicluna

No.	Pos.	Nation	Player
19		MLT	Loumar Cutajar
20		SYR	Shaban Chikh Ali
21		MLT	Francesco Gusman
23		MLT	Redheil Stivala
24		NGR	Richmond Baratuipre Hanson
25		MLT	Jamie Delia
26		MLT	Cedric Zahra
61	GK	MLT	Levi Saliba
99	GK	MLT	Gerson Mifsud
