= Kirkop United F.C. =

Maltese football club

Kirkop United FC
- Full name: Kirkop United Football Club
- Nickname: The Reds
- Founded: 1951; 75 years ago as Kirkop Stars
- Chairman: Joseph Farrugia
- Manager: Matthew Caruana
- League: National Amateur League
- 2021–22: National Amateur League, Group B, 7th
Home colours	Away colours	Third colours

Kirkop United Football Club is a Maltese football club based in Ħal Kirkop, Malta. The club currently plays in the Maltese National Amateur League B. They also play in the annual Maltese FA Trophy.

== History ==
Founded as Kirkop Stars by Klement Farrugia in 1951, the club played its first match in 1954 against Xewkija Tigers and was one of the founding members of the Malta Amateur Football Association in 1955. They then joined the MFA as associate members in 1956 and they were, renamed Kirkop United, finally admitted to play in the Third Division ahead of the 1957-58 season.

== Current squad ==
As of 22 March 2025

Note: Flags indicate national team as defined under FIFA eligibility rules; some limited exceptions apply. Players may hold more than one non-FIFA nationality.

No.	Pos.	Nation	Player
1	GK	MLT	Antonio Chetcuti
1	GK	MLT	Krassimir Zammit
1	GK	MLT	Marshall Zammit
2	DF	MLT	Gareth Cassar
2	DF	MLT	Jordi Vassallo
3	DF	MLT	Jake Aquilina
4	DF	MLT	Brendan Scerri
5	DF	MLT	Neil Thomas Farrugia
7	MF	MLT	Dale Tabone
8	MF	MLT	Jamie Cassar
9	FW	FRA	Dicko Seydna Oumar Drissa
10	FW	MLT	Matthew Borg
11	MF	MLT	Quelin Micallef
12	GK	FRA	Matteo Giuseppe Tallarico
13		MLT	Michael Theuma

No.	Pos.	Nation	Player
14		COL	Juan Manuel Artiaga Roa
15		MLT	Idrick Schembri
15		MLT	Halen Grima
15		MLT	Dejan Xuereb
16		MLT	David Callus
17		MLT	Scion Cassar Grech
18		POR	Andre Gomes Matos
19		MLT	Miguel Calleja
20		MLT	Zven Polidano
21		MLT	Misael Tabone
22		MLT	Daryl Vella Gerada
23		MLT	Carrick Saliba
45		MLT	Gian-Piero Tozzolino
92		MLT	Carmelo Farrugia
