= Għargħur F.C. =

Maltese football club

Għargħur
- Full name: Għargħur Football Club
- Nickname: The Reds
- Founded: 1944; 82 years ago
- Ground: Għargħur Football Ground, Għargħur
- Capacity: 800
- President: Mark Pullicino
- Head Coach: Alan Friggieri
- League: National Amateur League 2
- 2024–25: National Amateur League, Group B, 3rd
- Website: https://www.facebook.com/GharghurFC
Home colours

Għargħur Football Club is an ameteur football club from the small village of Għargħur in north-western Malta. Għargħur currently competes in the Maltese National Amateur League II.

== Current Senior Squad ==
As of 22 March 2025

Note: Flags indicate national team as defined under FIFA eligibility rules; some limited exceptions apply. Players may hold more than one non-FIFA nationality.

No.	Pos.	Nation	Player
1	GK	MLT	James Abela
2	DF	MLT	David Mifsud
3	DF	MLT	Jayden Mejlak
4	DF	MLT	Jonathan Cutajar
5	DF	MLT	Constantine Polidano
5	DF	MLT	Jamie George Zammit
6	MF	MLT	Damian Micallef
6	MF	MLT	Aidan Zarb
6	MF	MLT	Liam Mifsud
7	MF	VEN	Nestor Luis Silva
8	MF	SYR	Ali Shannah
9	FW	MLT	Sebastian Farrugia
9	FW	MLT	Jake Agius
10	FW	JPN	Nobukatsu Tsuchiya
11	MF	MLT	Jayden Aquilina
12	GK	MLT	Gabriel La Rosa

No.	Pos.	Nation	Player
13		MLT	Neil Borg
14		MLT	Lee Ciantar
15		MLT	Daniel Quintano
16		MLT	Miguel Buhagiar Pisani
16		MLT	Isaac Chircop
18		MLT	Kurt Camilleri
18		MLT	Max Kirkbride
18		MLT	Alex Sapienza
19		MLT	Daniel Sciberras
20		MLT	Miguel Simiana
21		MLT	Kieran Rapinett
21		MLT	Nicholas Formosa
26	GK	MLT	Luke Camilleri
29		MLT	Mark Cutajar
93	GK	MLT	Warren Galea

== Other Squads ==
Għargħur FC participates in Malta Football Association Youth Competition. The Għargħur FC has also its own Nursery with the aim to nurture young athletes from around the Maltese Island with a holistic development programme. The inclusive approach attracts both local and foreign athletes.

== History ==
There is little evidence about football in Għargħur between 1960 and 1974, with some participation in amateur participation that got stronger in early seventies. Għargħur St Albert was founded in 1971 and later Mr Joseph Debono felt the ambition to take the club to a higher level. After participating in the MFA Amateur League, first game 30th September 1973 win 3-1 over Florid Lions (Cospicua) and eventually winning the title.

The club was subsequently named as Għargħur Football Club and formalised during its first General meeting on 8th June 1974. After ten challenging years, and following changes in national leagues, Għargħur FC earned the first promotion in 1983/1984, coached by Tony Cordina. The unbeaten team won Section B with just some points lost in tie games against St. Lucija, Luqa St. Andrews, and Fgura United.
