= Palazzo Nasciaro =

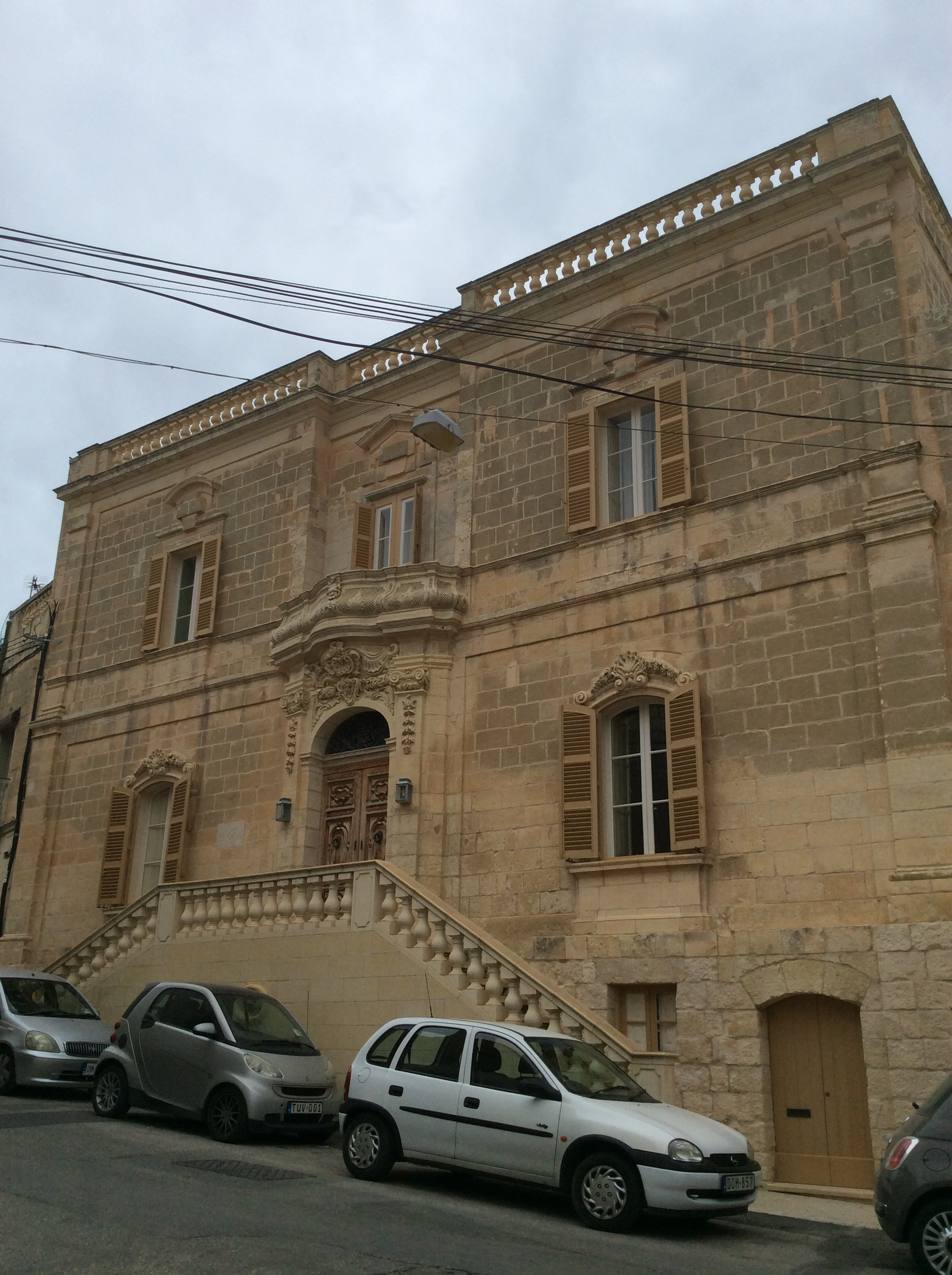
- Front façade of Palazzo Nasciaro

- Location within Malta
- Former names: Casa Nasciaro (Lieutenant's House), Naxxar School, Naxxar Police Headquarters, Naxxar Police Station

General information
- Status: Intact
- Type: Residential Townhouse
- Architectural style: Late Baroque (Rococo)
- Location: Naxxar, Malta
- Coordinates: 35°54′49.25″N 14°26′42.24″E
- Named for: Naxxar Town
- Completed: 18th century
- Renovated: 2007-2014
- Owner: Paul Golding

Technical details
- Material: Limestone
- Floor count: 3
- Floor area: 700 sq. m indoors, 500 sq. m outdoors and 115 sq. m in shelter/underground

Design and construction
- Architects: Franceso Sammut, Giovanni Sammut

Renovating team
- Architect: Joseph Micallef (restorer)

Website
- www.palazzonasciaro.com

Palazzo Nasciaro is an 18th-century townhouse in Naxxar (Casal Nasciaro), Malta, built during the Order of St. John. The townhouse was originally built as a family home, but has undergone adaptive reuse several times to fit the changing needs of the local population.

The building was first constructed to be the primary home, and later vacation home, of the architects who designed it. During the British period, it served as the Lieutenant's House (Dar -il Kmand), serving a post for the administration of regions in Malta. It would later serve as the first police station in Naxxar and the first police headquarters of the region. The building was also used as the first primary school of Naxxar. An air raid shelter was constructed in the house during World War II and used by the local community when Malta was bombarded; the shelter hosted a maternity ward for an underground hospital.

The recent renaming of the townhouse as Palazzo Nasciaro could be misleading as its layout shows it is not a palace. The renaming is probably used for romanticism. The townhouse is claimed to have rococo architecture a type of baroque architecture.

== Location ==
Palazzo Nasciaro was built on a strategic hill overlooking the three villages of Malta region consisting of Attard, Balzan and Lija. Today, the surroundings are developed, and the villages are now towns. The building is close to the main piazza, Victory Square, near the core of Naxxar. The street on which it stands was previously known as Strada Reale. It was renamed Main Street (Triq il-Kbira) when Lord Gerald Strickland Anglicanised many Maltese street names in the 1920s. In modern times, the street still leads directly to the main piazza, but it is no longer the main street to Valletta due to more recent building developments.

It is found next to the house of the Naxxar parish priest. Naxxar is a village on a hill, while at the same time the palace is elevated from the street. It is built on two floor with a large underlying shelter. It originally looked over the three villages.

== History ==
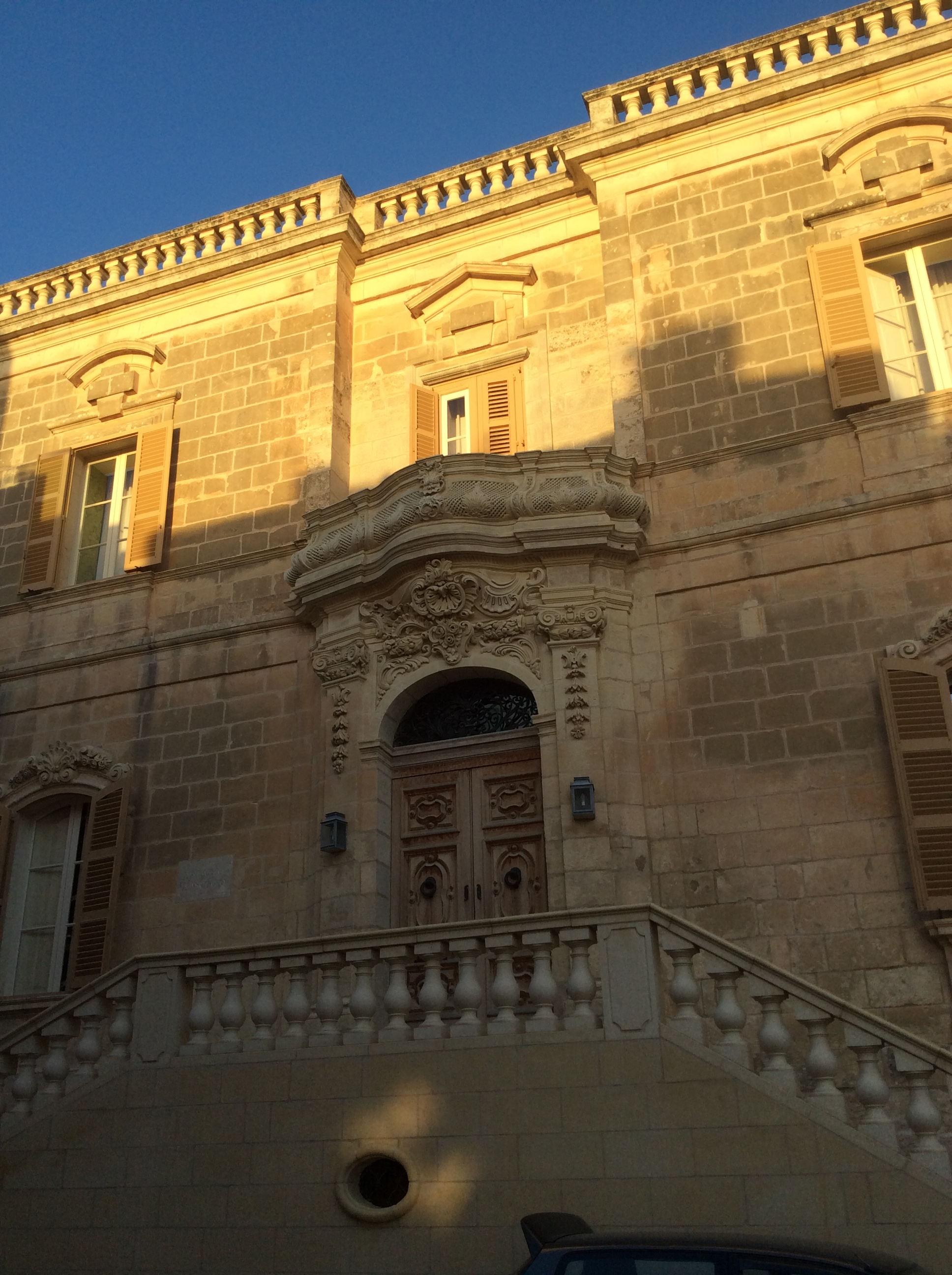
Baroque façade

=== Sammut Family ===
Palazzo Nasciaro was built during the Order of St. John and designed by architect Francesco Sammut (born. 1755), with some alterations by his son Giovanni Sammut. Francesco Sammut designed the townhouse to be his official residence and then his son Giovanni inherit it from him. Both Franceso and Giovanni are well known architects but most of their work is still archived. The townhouse is also known in history to have belonged to the Amato family.

=== Lieutenant's House ===
Palazzo Nasciaro was the Lieutenant's house during the British period. This position was held as a form of administrative area not just of Naxxar but of the surroundings that at the time extended till St. Paul's Bay. The Lieutenant was known among the few residents at the time in the Italian language as 'luogotenente'. At the time there was a language problem and the rise of political activism for the first time in Malta. Several nobles, including Giuseppe Scicluna, were pro-Italian while at the same time Britain kept the teaching of education at the hands of the Maltese noble classes until the nineteenth century with the teaching of Italian. In Naxxar the residents were mainly noble families, pro-Italian and for this reason even referred to the Lieutenant in Italian. The palace was referred to either Casa del Luogotenente or Casa Nasciaro.

=== Naxxar Primary School ===
Palazzo Nasciaro was probably the first public, and free, school in Naxxar. The school was opened after education boosted with education initiatives by the British government in Malta, at the same time when several other schools in Malta have been opened. Palazzo Nasciaro addressed a social need in Naxxar; a secondary school was built a throw-stone away, in the same street, within the former gardens of the palace. School toilet rooms were built and added to the palace when it was a school and are still part of the palace today. Elisa Scicluna was given a transfer as a headmistress from Msida to Naxxar in 1904, in order to open this public school.

=== Naxxar Police Station ===
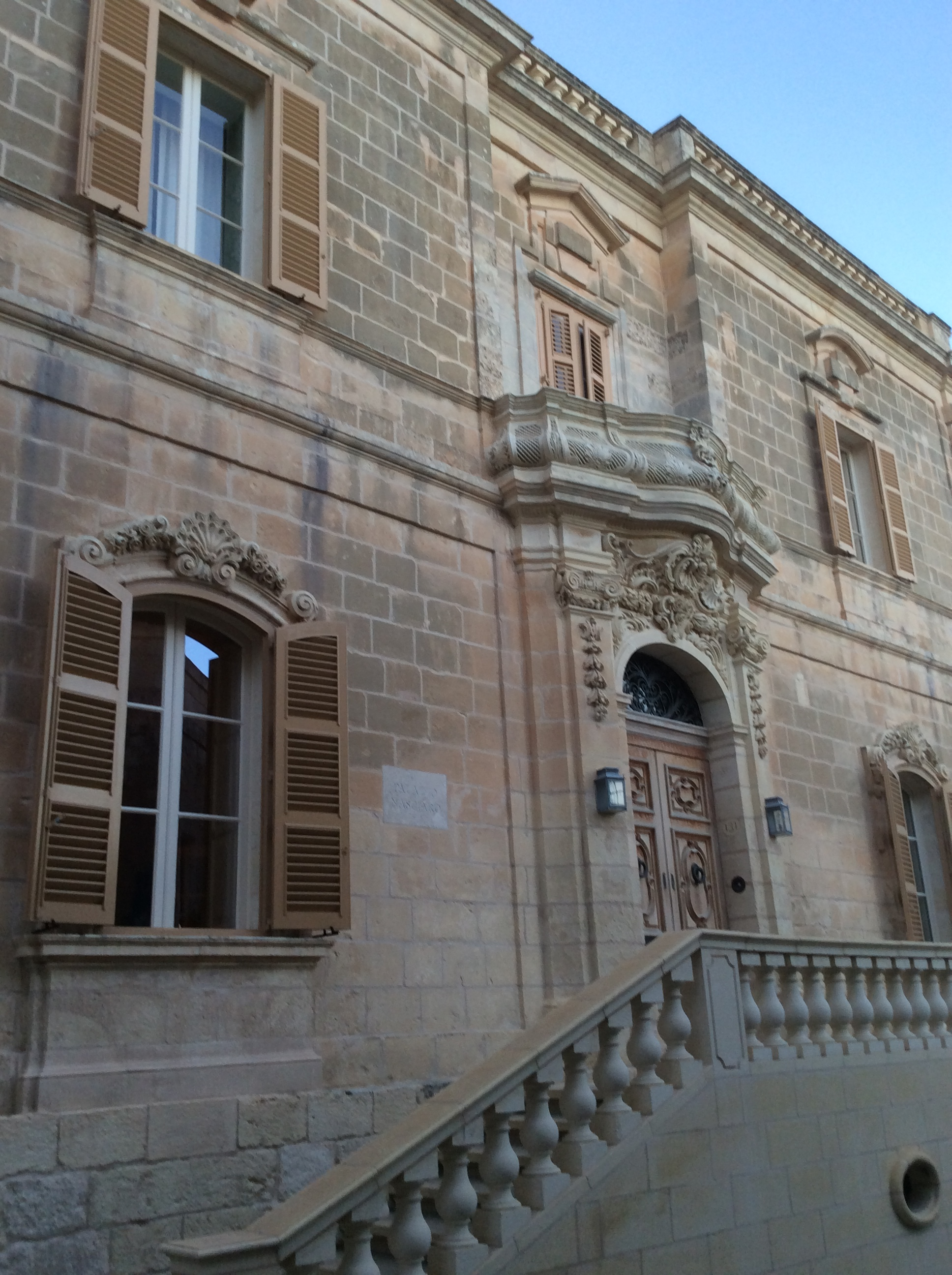
Plaque saying "Palazzo Nasciaro"

Palazzo Nasciaro is still known among the locals as the "old police station". The Local Council of Naxxar and the local residents refer to the building as the old police station as it still was a police station at the end of the twentieth century, before it was abandoned for more than twenty years. Despite this gives it recent notability within the Police Force of Malta, and the Local community in general, further notability is for the fact that it served as a police headquarters of a large region in the north of Malta during the British and the beginning of the force. The traditional Maltese timber balcony, that stood for two centuries on the façade together with the baroque-designed balcony, had been removed when the building was a police station. The lower half of the balcony, made of Maltese limestone, is retained. This half has intricate stone carvings and gives an interesting character to the building. The carvings start from the main archway entrance, where the door stands, and goes up to the balcony. This gives the lower and upper floor continuous harmony in terms of architecture.

=== Shelter and underground maternity hospital ===
During World War II Malta had direct involvement in the war receiving bombardments from Italy and Germany. For safety measures several war time shelters have been built mainly near the cities within the fortifications of the Order of St. John. In the villages such as Naxxar only few shelters were excavated in private homes by families who permitted them. The most known war time shelter are the one found at Palazzo Parisio and the one at Palazzo Nasciaro, specifically because they were both opened for public when time called and both were used as temporal underground hospitals. Palazzo Nasciaro has two shelters on different levels underground, with one dug and starting at street level used as a maternity hospital. The shelters were excavated by hands in the form of labyrinth. The "Air Raid" plaque, that was displayed at the entrance of Palazzo Nasciaro, is today to be found at the Malta at War Museum.

=== Modern ===
In modern contemporary restoration took place to be used as a private residence by Paul Golding. Restoration and modernization has taken place from 2007 after the townhouse fell in disuse for about twenty years, and took another seven years to finalise. The owner has developed a studio apartment on the first floor at the back of the house and added an indoor swimming pool. The original upper part of the balcony that was made of timber, which existed on the front façade, is not scheduled to be rebuilt. The house is now fitted with furniture and other movable property from established firms and designers. It is currently for sale.

== Architecture ==
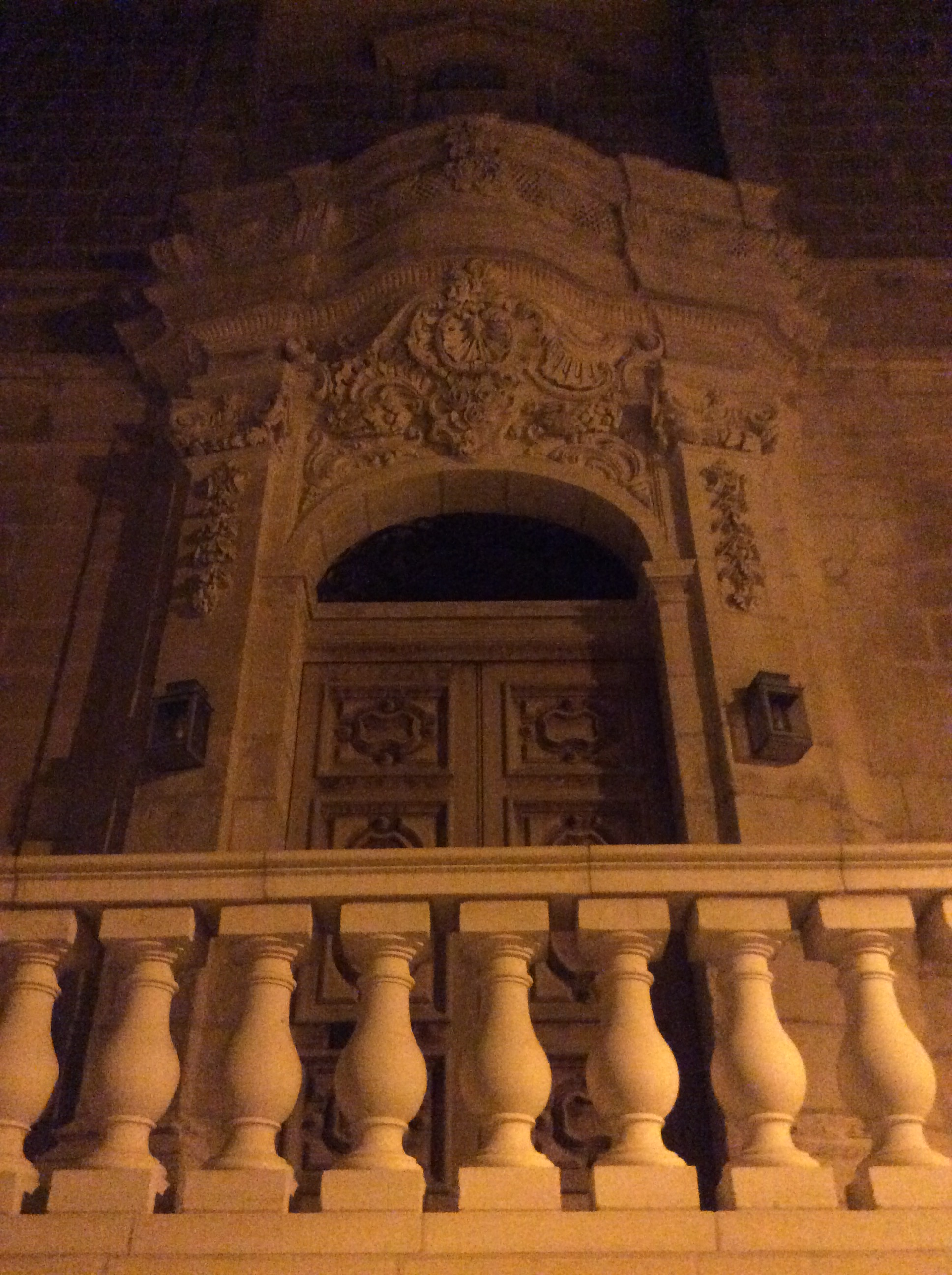
Palazzo Nasciaro

=== Exterior ===
The palace has an imposing Baroque and symmetrical front façade. The façade was initially designed by Franceso Sammut but was then redesigned by his son Giovanni as a gift of love to his wife. Matching but newly designed terrace columns were fixed to the decor after renovation instead of the former iron bars. The facade features three floors at street level. At the lower level there is access to the shelter while to access the main house there are two flight of stairs on both sides leading to the main door.

=== Interior ===
The interior has adopted similar architecture with a Maltese traditional courtyard. It has baroque-designed archways in the entrance and siderooms. Most of the building is modest in architecture. Today the palace is kept in the form of a home and modernization went underway. However many features have been kept such as exposition of limestone to give the sense of grotesque place and the history behind it. The palace has high ceiling, wooden apertures, original stone slabs and more. The upstairs was given more colour and modernization while preservation was still kept in mind. The palace has three indoor flight of stairs. Decorative fittings were brought from UK and France.

== Outdoor ==
=== Former gardens ===
The large gardens, that the building once had, were opened for the public as Gnien il-Kmand (Commander's Gardens) named for the Lieutenant. It was the Lieutenant that knowing that there was lack of recreative areas in the surroundings he decided to make use of the gardens by opening them to the public. However the gardens were later developed into modern housing.

=== Central courtyard and backyard ===
The central courtyard still retains some of the original features of the building, with minimal modifications. In the courtyard there are some plantations such as Cestrum nocturnum and Star Jasmine giving the palace a romantic appearance day and night. At the courtyard a small but decorative fountain features at a wall. Most rooms on the groundfloor touching the courtyard have direct portal access to the courtyard. From the large backgardens there is now a side backyard.

== Cultural Heritage ==
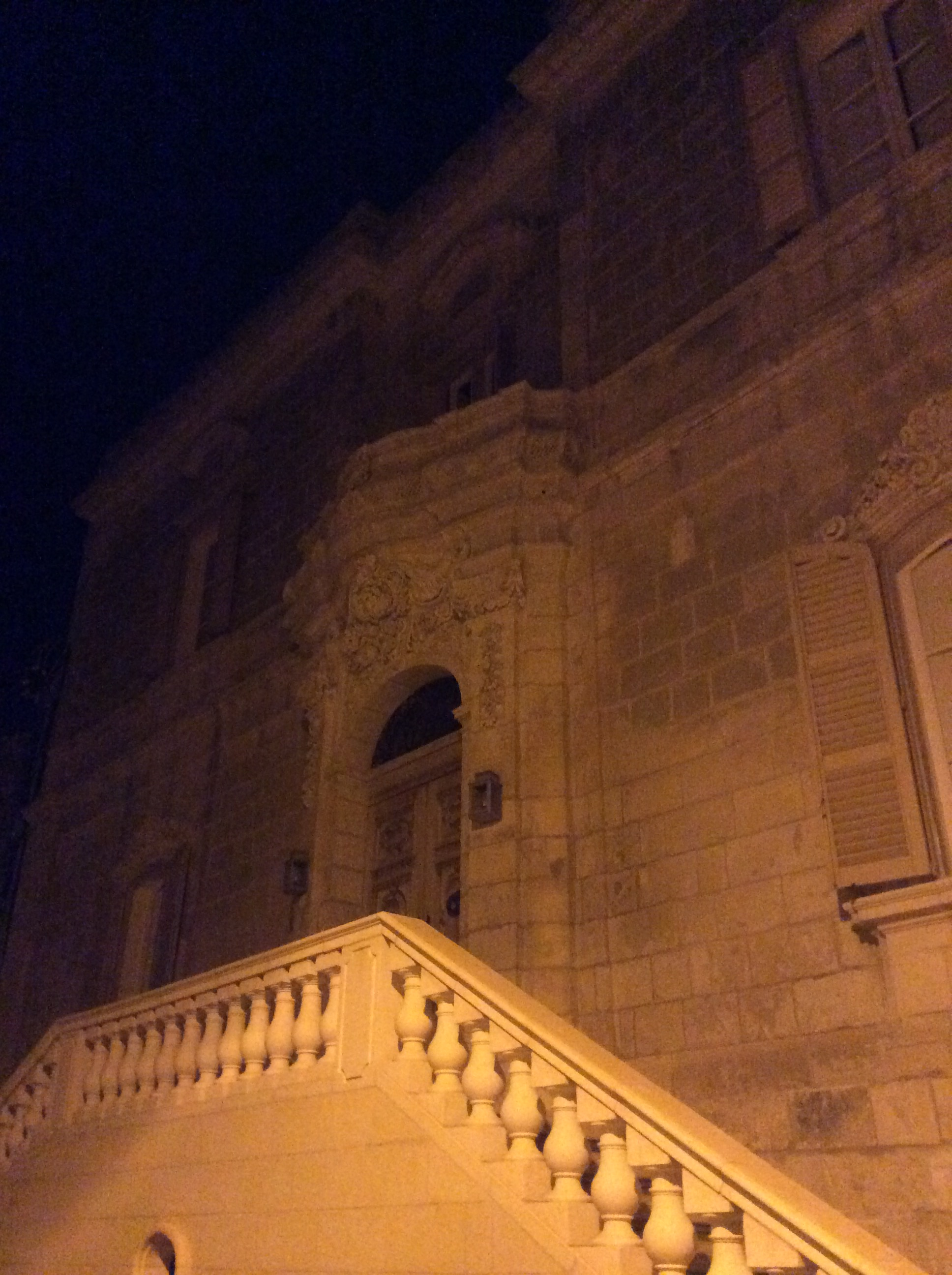
The Palazzo at night

The townhouse, at 31 Triq il-Kbira, is listed as a grade 2 national monument by the Malta Environment and Planning Authority (MEPA). The house was scheduled as it features several original Maltese architectural features, but also because of its history, uniqueness and as it is in an urban conservation area in Naxxar.

== See also ==
- Naxxar
- Palazzo Parisio
