= Rebecka Bebben Andersson =

Swedish artist

Rebecka "Bebben" Andersson, born in 1984 in Linköping, is a Swedish artist. Among her public works of art, there are about ten larger wall installations from the years 2017–2019 in the Stockholm area: nine along the Tvärbanan, a two-part on the outside of Långbrodalsskolan and one at Södersjukhuset.
