= Palazzo Parisio (Naxxar) =

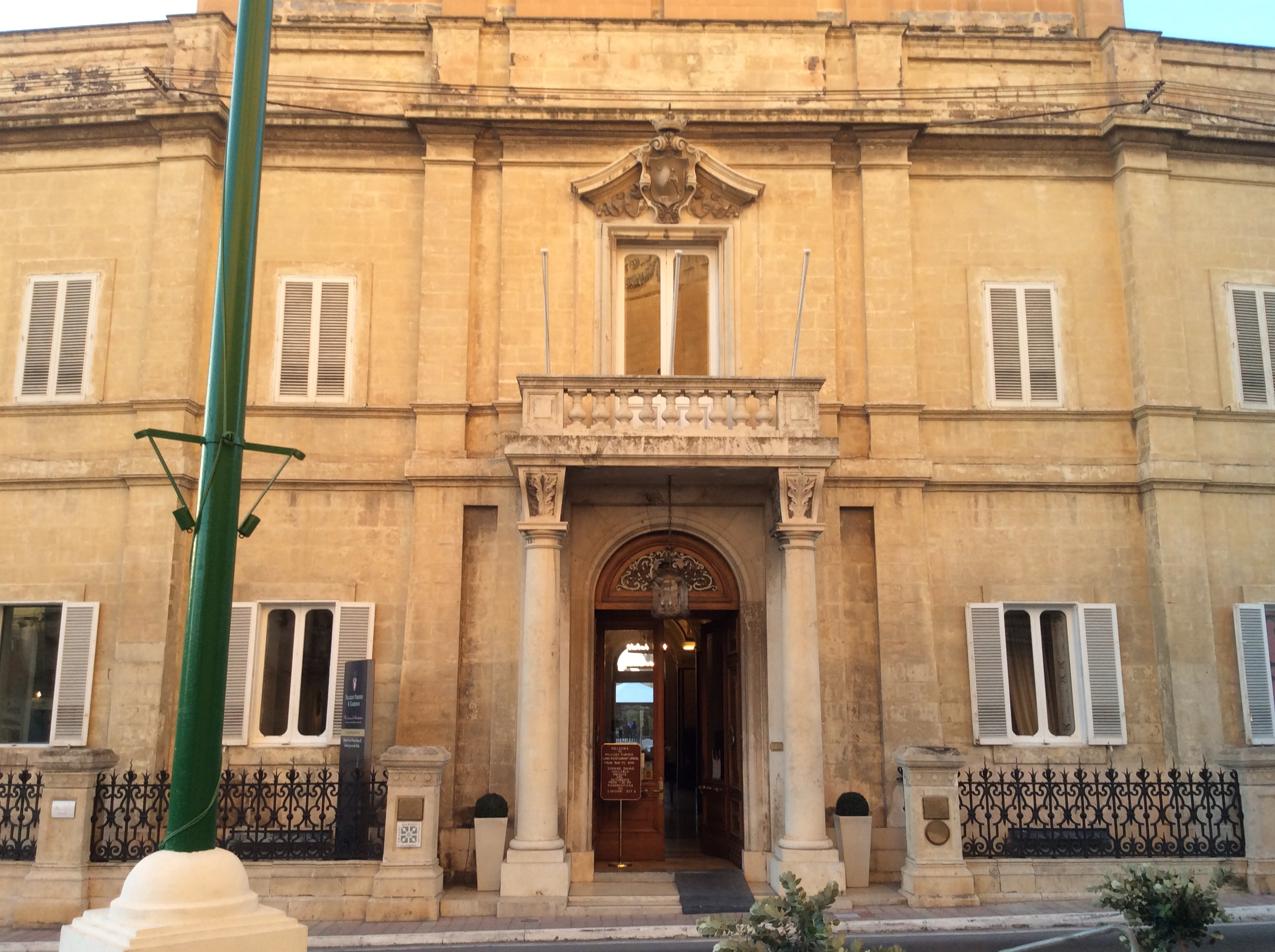
- Front façade of Palazzo Parisio
- Interactive map of Palazzo Parisio

General information
- Status: Intact
- Type: Mansion, palace
- Architectural style: Art Nouveau exterior and Sicilian Baroque interior
- Location: Naxxar, Malta
- Coordinates: 35°54′53.8″N 14°26′39.3″E
- Named for: Parisio Muscati family (formerly for the Scicluna family)
- Completed: 1906-1907
- Owner: Scicluna family

Technical details
- Material: Limestone

Design and construction
- Architect: Annibale Lupi

Renovating team
- Architect: Carlo Sada

Website
- www.palazzoparisio.com

Palazzo Parisio, formerly known as Scicluna Palace, Palazzo Scicluna, and officially Palazzo Parisio and Gardens, is a 20th-century palace in Naxxar, Malta. On site was a hunting lodge built in 1733 by Paolo Parisio, and was used as a summer or permanent residence, barracks and a college, before being acquired by the Marquis Scicluna in 1898.

The marquis modified the building between 1900 and 1907 with the appearance visible today. Its architecture is composed of an Art Nouveau front and back façades and a Sicilian Baroque interior. Today, Palazzo Parisio and its surrounding gardens are in good condition and are open to the public.

== History ==
=== Hunting lodge ===
A hunting lodge was built on site in 1733 by Grand Master António Manoel de Vilhena. After his death, the building was taken over by the Order of St. John, and it eventually passed into the hands of the Parisio family, who used it as a summer residence. It eventually became the permanent residence of Paolo Parisio Muscati. In 1798, the hunting lodge briefly served as a barracks during the French occupation of Malta.

=== College ===
In 1856, the building passed into the hands of the Micallef family. They rented the property to the Jesuits in 1880, who used it as a college. The Jesuits made plans for purchasing the building, but the agreement was never reached and the building was acquired by Marquis Giuseppe Scicluna on 12 June 1898 for a sum of £1500.

=== Scicluna Palace ===
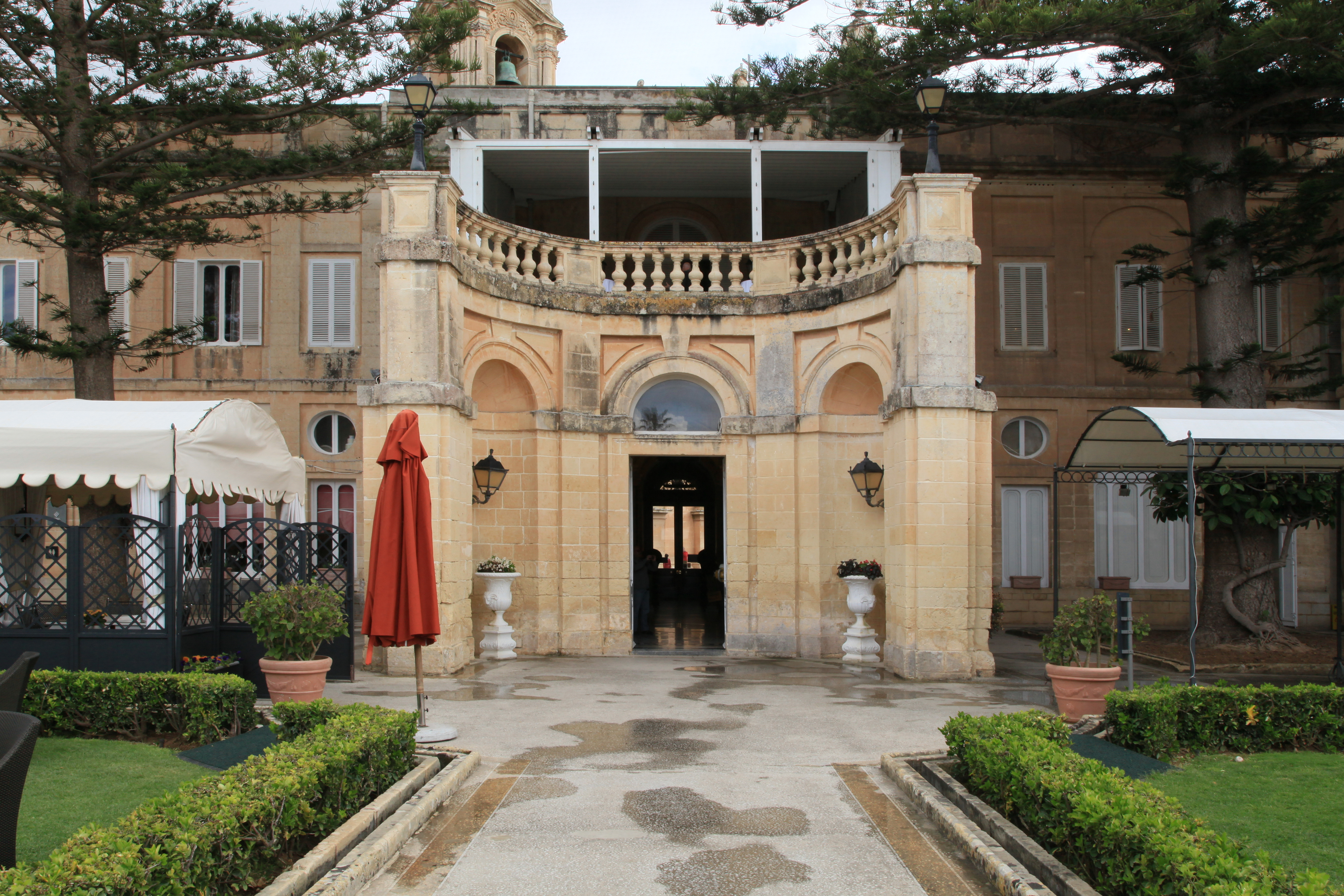
Palazzo Parisio as seen from its gardens

The Marquis approached architect Annibale Lupi (born 1869) to design and built on site an Art Nouveau mansion. He commissioned a team of Italian architects, sculptors and painters, led by Carlo Sada (born 1855), to embellish the interior and garden with Sicilian Baroque architecture and Pompeiian art. Work began in 1900, and was largely complete by 1906, when the marquis and his family moved into the palace. Scicluna died on 14 February 1907, before the refurbishment was fully completed, and his family moved back to their original residence in San Pawl tat-Tarġa.

The marble were sculpted and laid by Sicilian workers in 1902, as directed by Giuseppe Valenti. Among the workers were Baldassare Armato, his son Domenico Armato, Francesco Bondin and Andrea De Stefano. The main ceilings' frescoes were carried by Giacomo Olzai and Filippo Fortunato Venuti, both from Rome and completed by 1902. Other decorators included Giulio Moschetti and Vincenzo Cardona.

During the two world wars, the palace was handed over to the British Government to use it for public needs. It was also used as a R.A.F. Office, and hosted soldiers and their families.

=== Palazzo Parisio ===
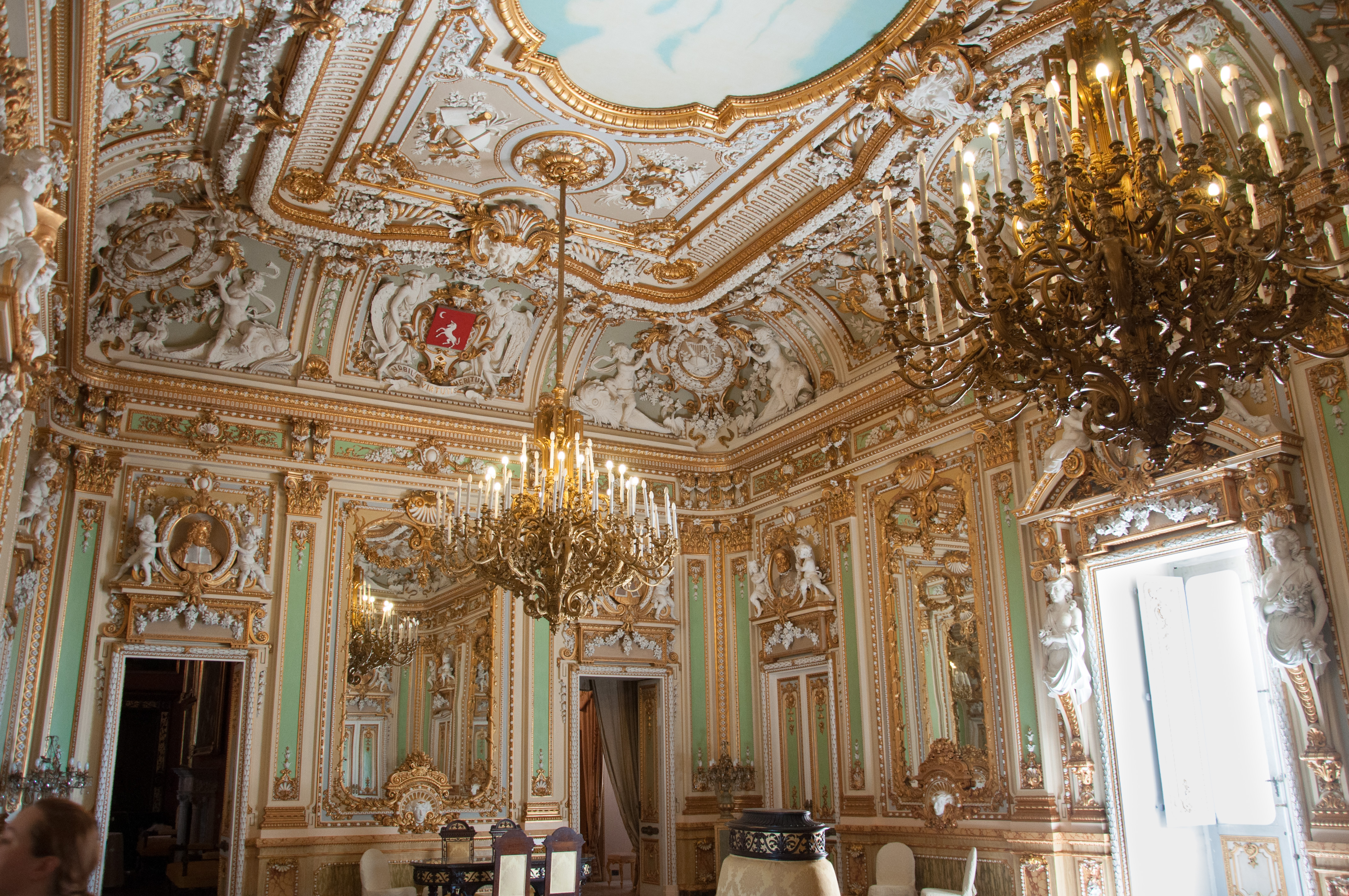
The ballroom

In the 21st century, Marie Christianne Scicluna who partially owns the palace has taken the initiative to renovate and revive the property. The palace and its gardens are now open to the public named as ‘’Palazzo Parisio and Gardens’’, and are rented for wedding venues. Two restaurants are also located within the palace.

The palace is scheduled as a Grade 1 property by the Malta Environment and Planning Authority, while its elevated pathway is a Grade 2. It is also listed on the National Inventory of the Cultural Property of the Maltese Islands.

== Architecture ==
=== Palace ===
Palazzo Parisio's façade contains a large doorway flanked by a column on each side. The columns support an open balcony, and the latter's doorway contains the Scicluna coat of arms.

The interior is richly decorated with frescoes, statues, columns, chandeliers and other works of art. The ballroom is gilded, and it is considered to be unique in Malta. The palace has been described as "a miniature Versailles."

=== Gardens ===
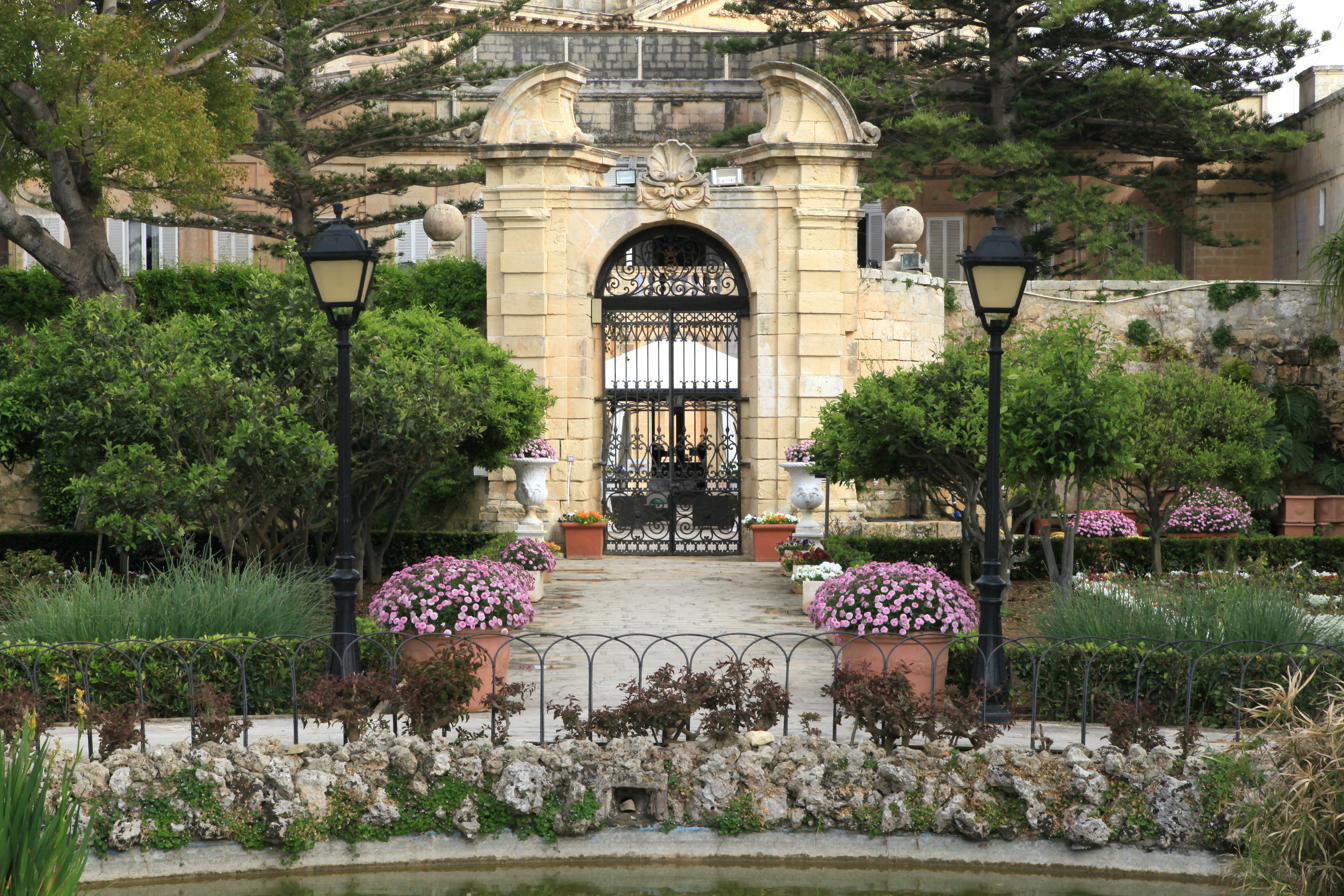
Gardens of Palazzo Parisio

The palace originally had very large gardens, but their size was reduced to make way for part of the former trade fair grounds. The Italian gardens near the palace still exist, and are now a tourist attraction and wedding venue.

The remaining gardens of the palace contain over 60 species of plants, including Ceiba speciosa, Erythrina crista-galli, Jacaranda and Sapindus.

=== La Taverna Del Marchese ===
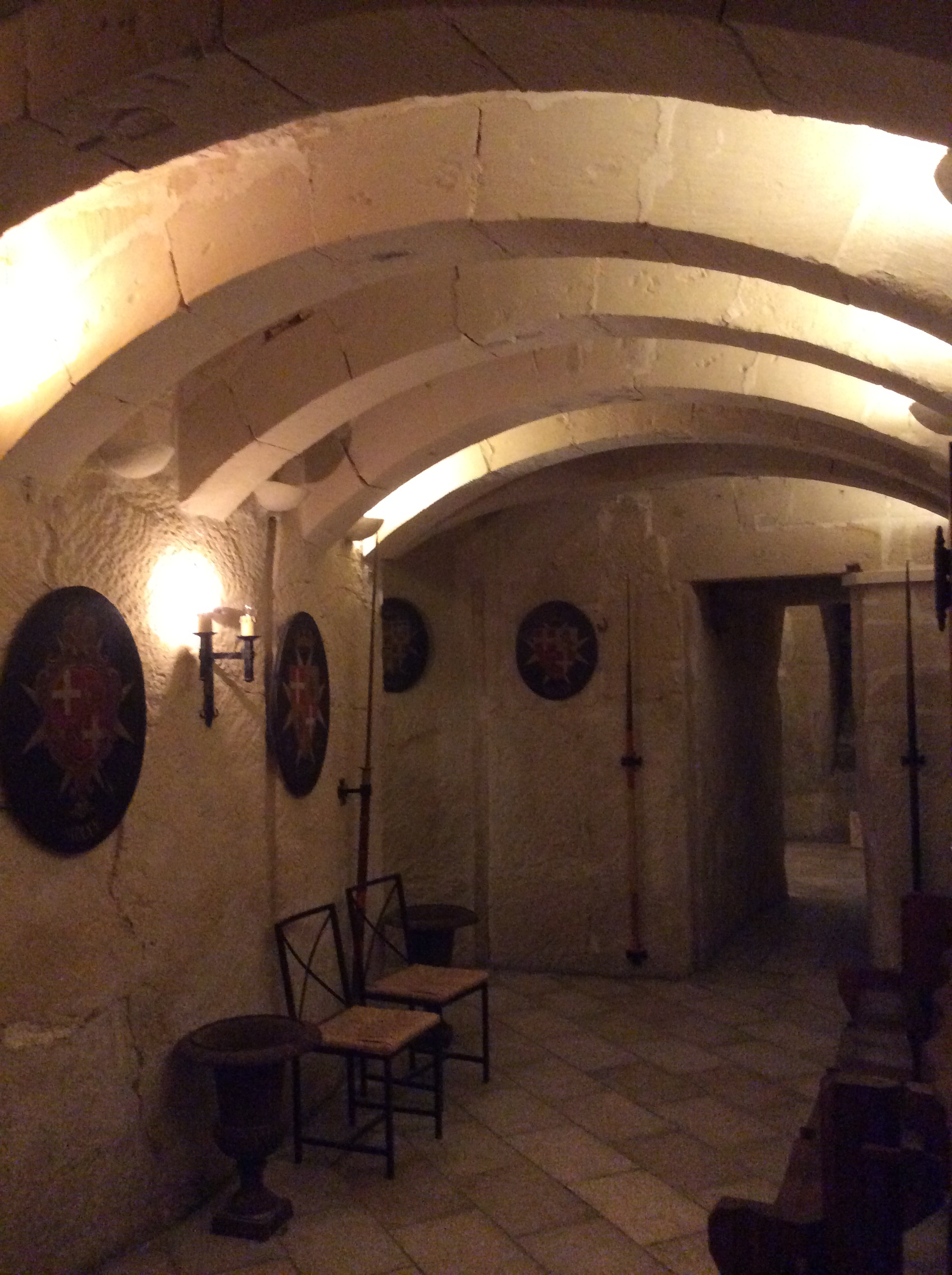
La Taverna Del Marchese

La Taverna Del Marchese is named after Marquis (Marchese) Giuseppe Scicluna. It is the underground of Palazzo Parisio. The tavern was designed to be a wine store, when Naxxar was largely dependent on agriculture bringing high income to farmers. The Tavern went through adaptive reuse as the Marqui opened the Tavern to the public during WWII to have shelter from air bombing. Being designed as a wine storage, unlike war shelters, the tavern is wider than usual private shelters such as the shelters at Palazzo Nasciaro.

During the war period, the shelter at Palazzo Nasciaro served as a maternity underground hospital, while the tavern at Palazzo Parisio served as a general underground hospital catering for Naxxar region and British soldiers. Similarly the Marquis opened the Dragonara Palace to be used as a hospital. Today the tavern was named in the commemoration of the Marquis. Large sections of the tavern are open to public, and some armoury are displayed in the form of a museum, while other sections are used as a kitchen for the palace's restaurants.

== Filming scenes ==
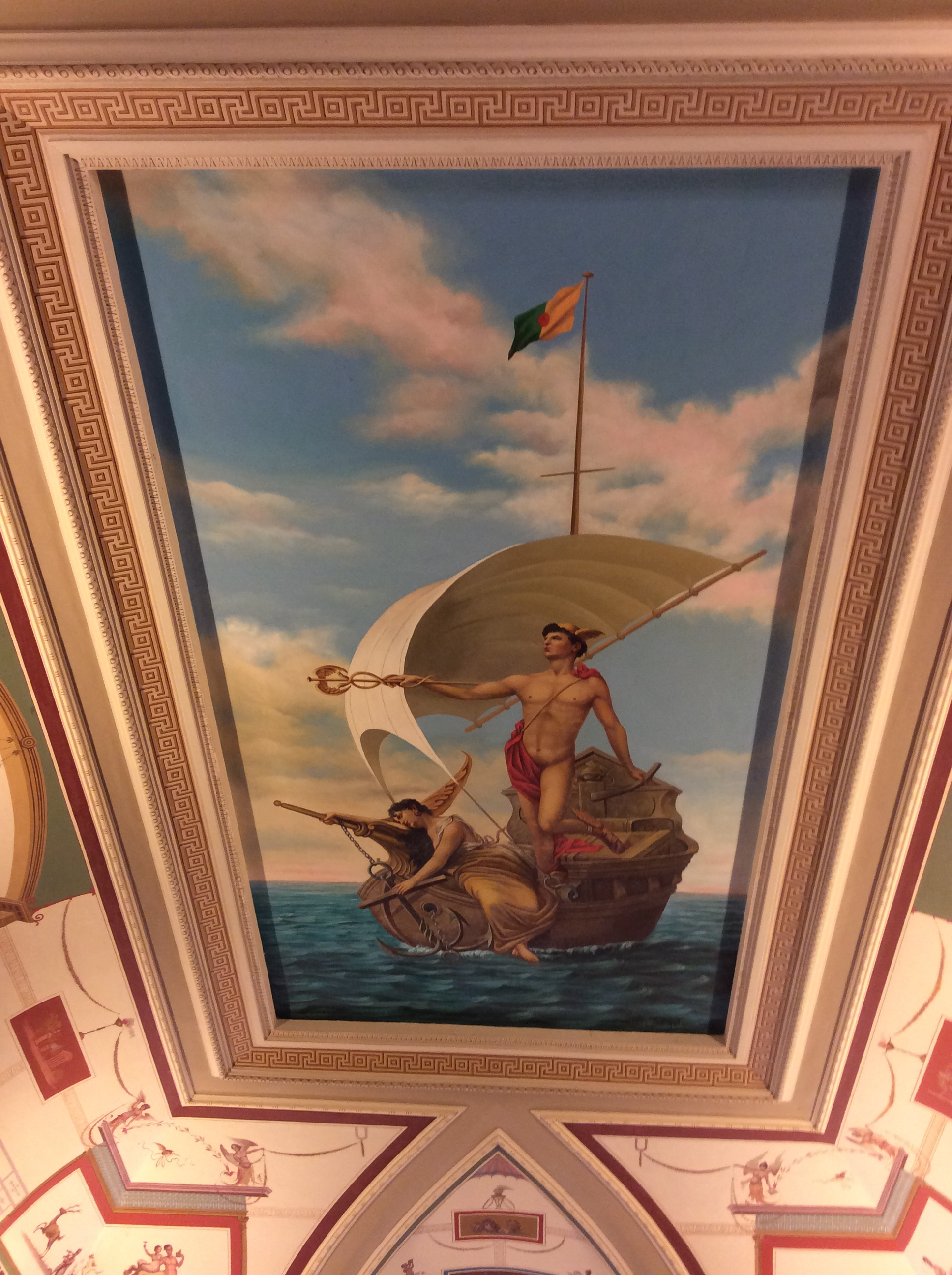
A Pompeian fresco at the palace

The palace was used as a filming location in a variety of movies, including Cutthroat Island and The Count of Monte Cristo (2002 film).

The palace features in the music video of Olivia Lewis called 'Vertigo', that was part of the 2007 Eurovision song contest.

== See also ==
Other Parisio family property

  - Palazzo Parisio, Valletta
  - Villa Parisio
- Jesuits colleges at the time
  - Villa St Ignatius
  - St Aloysius' College
