= Three Villages =

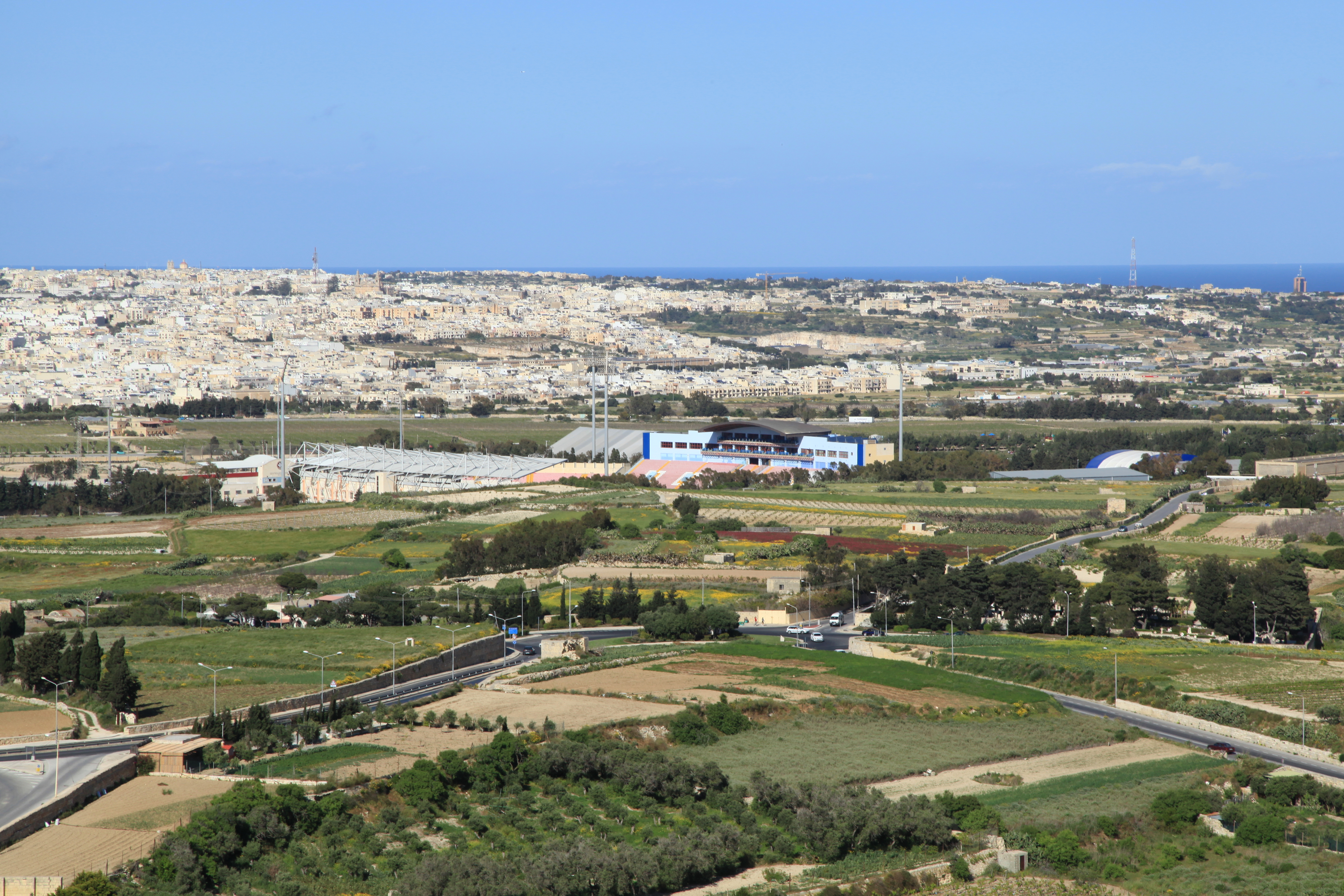
View of Attard and the surrounding area from the walls of Mdina.

The Three Villages (Maltese: It-Tliet Irħula) refers to the Maltese villages of Attard, Balzan, and Lija located around the centre of the island. The Three Villages are known as such because of their close proximity to one another. In some cases, one side of a street is part of one village while the opposite side of the same street is part of another village.

The three villages are also very similar in layout and age.

== History ==
During the Order of St. John, the three villages were sought after for country residences and hunting lodges, of which many built there large palaces as a symbol of nobility and to some extent even superiority over the rest of Maltese society.

== Demographics ==
From 1993 to 2014, the population of Attard and Lija increased by 70%, whilst Balzan's population decreased by 20% and grew in age.

Attard

Balzan

Lija

== See also ==
- Three Cities
