= Annunciation Church, Balzan =

Church in Malta

Parish Church of the Annunciation
- Il-Knisja Parrokjali tal-Lunzjata
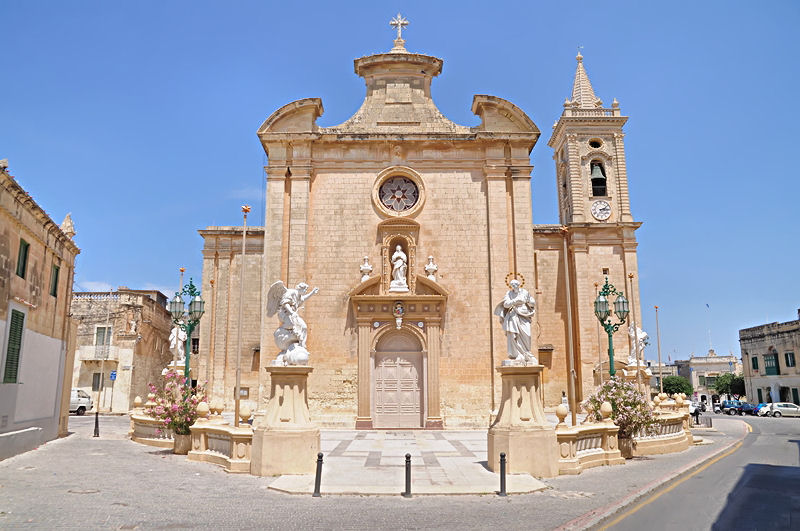
- The church's façade in 2011
- Parish Church of the Annunciation
- 35°53′55″N 14°27′05″E
- Location: Balzan, Malta
- Denomination: Roman Catholic
- Website: balzanparish.com

History
- Status: Parish church
- Dedication: Annunciation
- Consecrated: 7 October 1781

Architecture
- Functional status: Active
- Architectural type: Church
- Completed: 1695

Specifications
- Length: 120 ft (37 m)
- Width: 92 ft (28 m)
- Materials: Limestone

Administration
- Archdiocese: Malta
- Parish: Balzan

The Parish Church of the Annunciation is one of the Roman Catholic parish churches located in the village of Balzan, Malta.

== History ==
The original church of the Annunciation dated back to the 14th century. On 14 August 1655 Balzan became an independent parish and the church was chosen as the parish church. On 23 December 1669 the cornerstone of the new church was laid. The church was built in the form of a Latin cross. Works were completed by 1695 and the church was blessed that year on 23 January by Bishop Davide Cocco Palmieri and consecrated by Bishop Vincenzo Labini on 7 October 1781. A belfry was also added in 1708 which today includes 6 bells made in Annecy, France, by Fonderie Paccard. The largest bell of this set weighs about 4 tons and is the third largest bell in Malta. The bell was blessed and installed in January 1949. An electric clock was added in 1970.

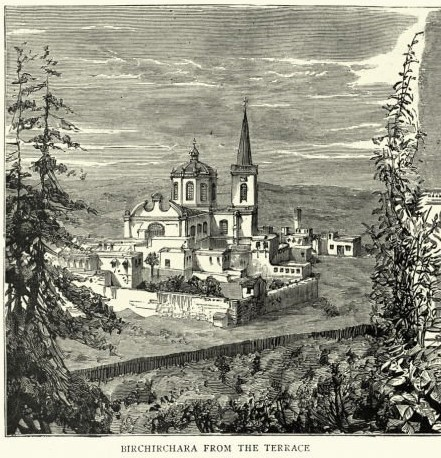
Balzan in 1886

== See also ==
- Catholic Church in Malta
