= Maltese International Trade Fair Grounds =

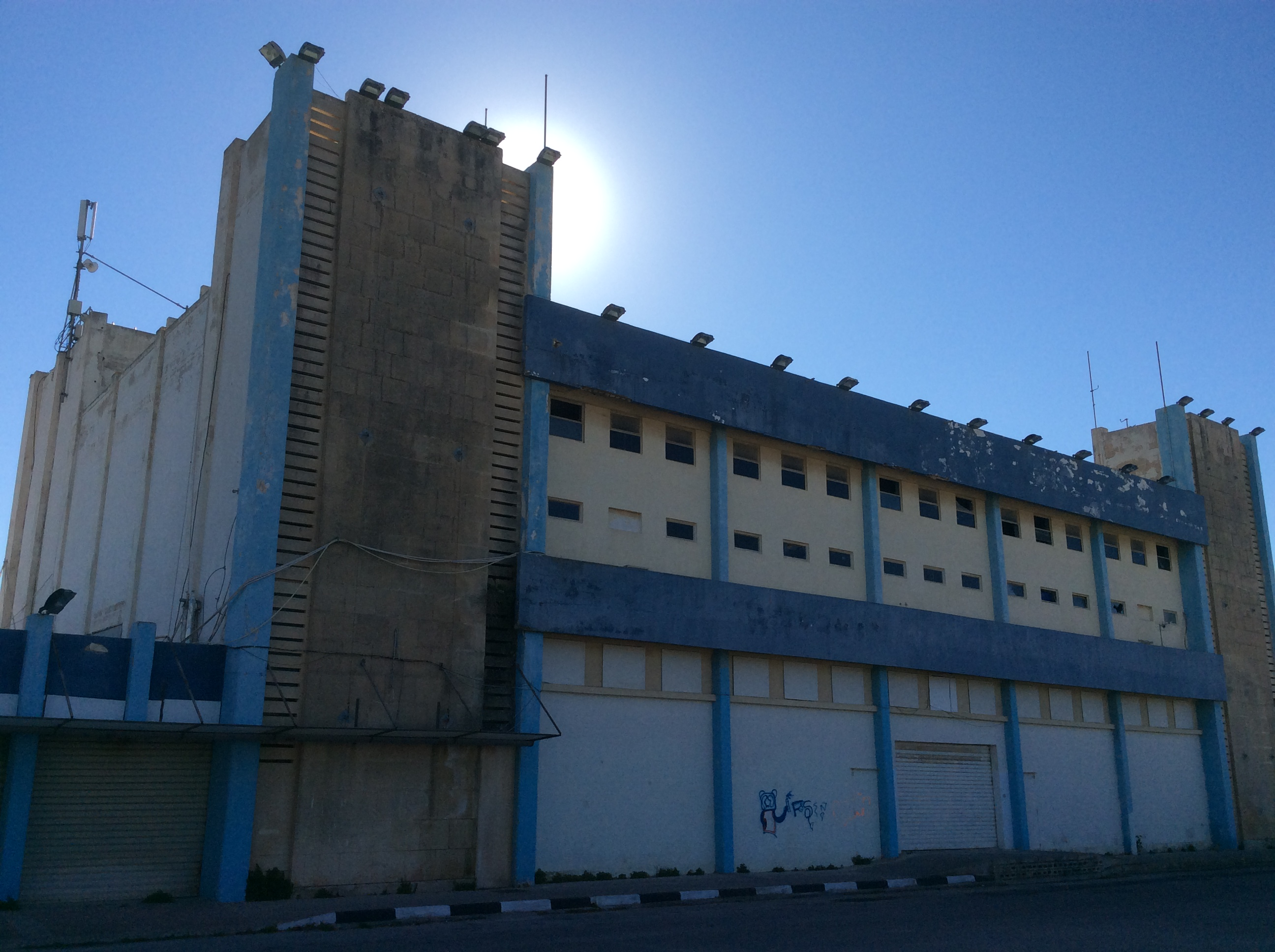
The former Trade Fair Grounds in 2017

The Trade Fair Grounds, also known as the Trade Fairs and Exhibition Centre, is a former fairground in Naxxar, Malta. It hosted various exhibitions and fairs throughout the year, but was mostly known for being the venue for the annual Malta Trade Fair. Prior to the construction of the trade fair complex, the area had been part of the gardens of Palazzo Parisio.

== History ==
The fairground hosted forty-nine editions of the Malta Trade Fair, from 1958 to 2006. After the ground rent expired, the Malta Trade Fair was moved to the Malta Fairs & Conventions Centre in Ta' Qali in 2007, and has been held there ever since. At this point, plans were made to redevelop the former fairground in Naxxar into a housing project, a local centre and an underground car park. In 2010, the Trade Fair Exhibitors Association took over the lease and applied to host the trade fair at the Naxxar complex again, but the licence was refused, resulting in a legal battle. The Naxxar Local Council opposed any attempts to return the Trade Fair to the former fairground.

In 2008, the Electoral Commission moved its Vote Counting Complex to the former Trade Fair Grounds, after the original counting hall in Ta' Qali was demolished to make way for the American Embassy. This counting hall was used for most elections between 2008 and 2017, with the exception of the 2011 divorce referendum.

New plans for redeveloping the site were submitted in 2017, and these include the demolition of the existing buildings and the construction of 490 apartments, 5,000 m^{2} (54,000 sq ft) of offices, 3,000 m^{2} (32,000 sq ft) of retail outlets and an underground car park.

== See also ==
- Palazzo Parisio
- Malta Fairs & Conventions Centre
