= Three Cities =

Three Cities may refer to:

- The Three Cities, 1894–1896 novel trilogy by Émile Zola
- Three Cities (Malta), the three fortified cities of Vittoriosa, Senglea, and Cospicua in eastern Malta
- Three Cities Productions, American non-profit documentary film production group
- De Drie Steden, Dutch historical magazine
- Three Cities coinage, 16th-century Dutch coinage
