= Three Cities Productions =

Film production company

Three Cities Productions is non-profit documentary film production group founded in 2006 to facilitate the production of their first feature-length documentary Lone Soldiers. This project is sponsored in part by the International Documentary Association.

== Founding ==
Three Cities was founded by David Alexander and Tamir Elterman in 2006. The name of the company refers to the hometowns of the two founders, Los Angeles (Alexander) and Berkeley (Elterman), and a third referring to "all the places in the world that they have not yet explored."

== Awards ==
Three Cities Productions has won several awards for their work, including the Oregon Student Film Festival - 1st Place, Music Video (2006) for their "Bombs Away" music video. For this video, they also won the Berkeley Video & Film Festival - Best of Festival (2006) award.

== Press coverage ==
The Jerusalem Post reported on December 23, 2007 about Three Cities' Lone Soldiers project, describing the production process, the artists' perspectives on their work, and their financial situation (including two buyout offers and their fundraising difficulties).
