= Balzan =

Balzan Ħal Balzan Casal Balzano
- Local council
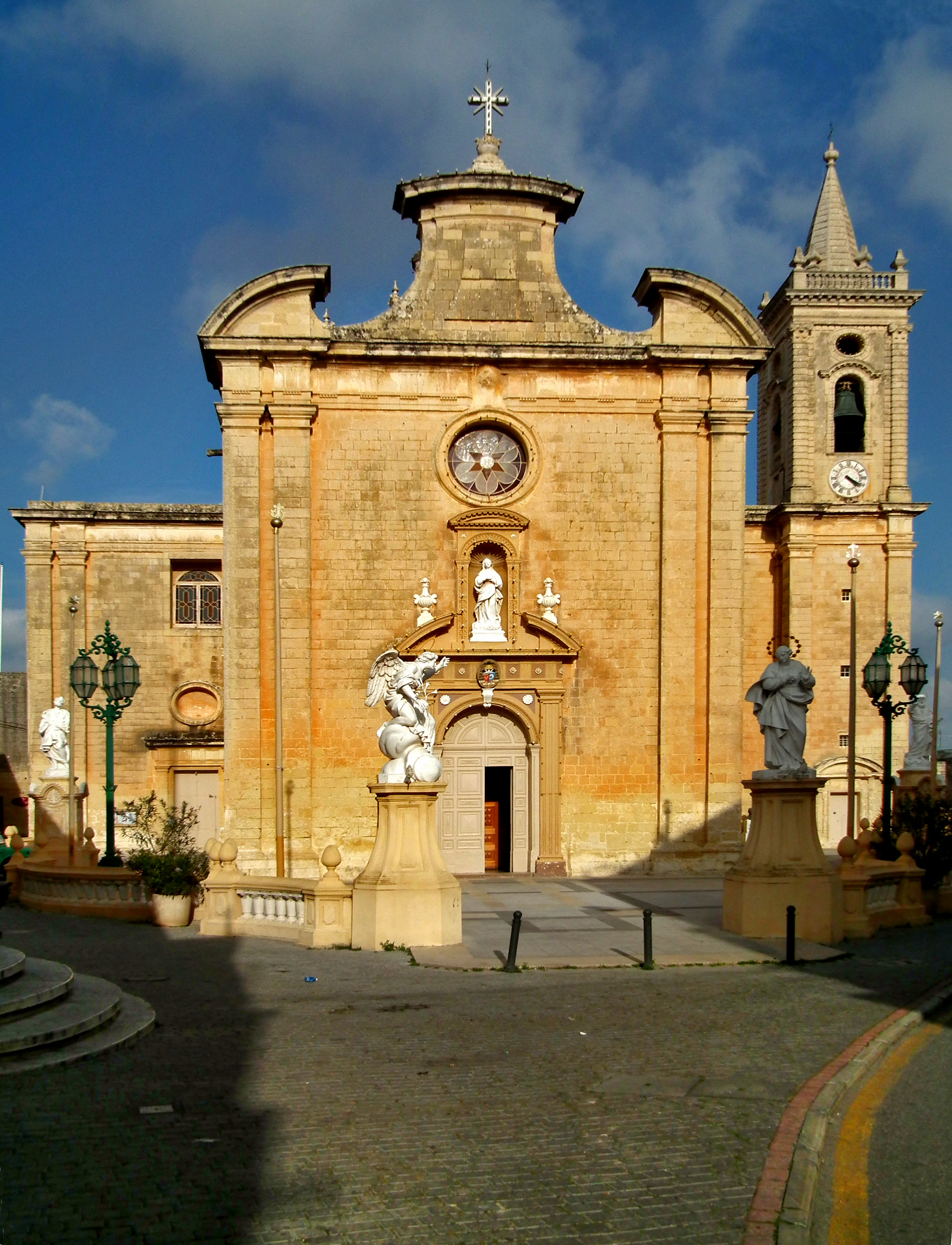
- Balzan Parish Church

- Flag Coat of arms
- Motto: Hortibus undique septa
- Coordinates: 35°53′53″N 14°27′12″E
- Country: Malta
- Region: Northern Region
- District: Western District
- Established: 1419–1420
- Borders: Attard, Birkirkara, Iklin, Lija

Government
  - Mayor: Dr. Angelo Micallef (PN)

Area
  - Total: 0.6 km^{2} (0.23 sq mi)
- Elevation: 56 m (184 ft)

Population (Jul. 2024)
  - Total: 5,022
  - Density: 8,400/km^{2} (22,000/sq mi)
- Demonyms: Balzani (m), Balzanija (f), Balzanin (pl)
- Time zone: UTC+1 (CET)
  - Summer (DST): UTC+2 (CEST)
- Postal code: BZN
- Dialing code: 356
- ISO 3166 code: MT-02
- Patron saint: Annunciation; St. Valentine
- Day of festa: 2nd Sunday of July; 14 February
- Website: Official website

Balzan (Maltese: Ħal Balzan) is a municipality in the Northern Region of Malta, and together with Attard and Lija, forms part of the "Three Villages" (Maltese: It-Tliet Irħula). The village originally consisted of a group of small dwellings and farms but eventually grew, becoming a parish in the 17th century. The population of Balzan was 5,022 in July 2024. This included 2,504 males and 2,518 females; 3,957 Maltese nationals and 1,065 foreign nationals.

== Etymology ==
In Malta, many village names are identical to certain family names, as in Attard and Lija. It is believed by some, therefore, that the village inherited its name from a family whose family name was Balzan.

Balsan (Balzan) literally means tax collector or contributions collector. The tax collector must have been from the same parish, at the time forming part of Birkirkara.

== Heritage and culture ==
The church houses various works of art by famous Maltese painters such as Giuseppe Calleja, Chev. Emvin Cremona and Paul Camilleri Cauchi. The statue used in the village feast celebrated on the 2nd week of July is carved in wood by Salvatore Dimech (is-sartx) and shows Our Lady and Gabriel the Archangel. The parish also celebrates the feast of St. Valentine.

As with Attard and Lija, Balzan is a sought-after location and popular with the middle and upper middle classes. The population has increased due to large-scale development taking place, largely in the form of apartment blocks replacing villas and their gardens. However, this is mainly occurring on the outskirts of the village, and not the historic centre. The majority of Balzan is an Urban Conservation Area.

The Malta railway formerly spanned through Triq Ferrovija L-Qadima. A platform that served the village and the Palace was located close to Vjal De Paule. Ficus trees adorned the ends of the platform. One of them is still standing and is now itself a landmark. A section of rail that was used to support the tree is encased in the tree.

== Architecture ==
=== Churches ===
- Annunciation Church, Balzan: This church stands in the village core of Balzan and dates to the 17th century. It was erected in 1655; however, it was soon felt that there was not enough space for the growing population of the village. The first stone for the new church was laid in 1669, and the new structure blessed in 1695. The architect is not known, but the design can be attributed to the Tuscan style for its exterior with a Doric interior and a dome influenced by Baroque, which had just been introduced in Malta during those times. The entrance to the church features a stone statue of Our Lady in a niche on top of which there is a stained-glass rose window in the form of a circle. The belfry was built in 1708 with the dome finished a year before.
- Parish Church of the Annunciation (Parish Church). This parish church, built in the 17th century, also stands in the village core. The blessing and laying of the foundation stone took place on 26 December 1669. Fr. Domenico Ellul was the parish priest at the time. The local community had been asking for a bigger church to accommodate the population of the village which continued to increase year on year. After many requests including an official petition presented by Fr Ellul to Vicar General Mgr Cauchi, their prayers were answered. Mgr Balaguer registered his acceptance of their wishes officially on 11 July 1663. The shape of the church follows the rules set forth by the church in the Council of Trent dictating the requirement to have the building in the plan of a cross. The nave is designed to lead to the main altar which faces East, a North and South Transep and a specially allocated space for the Choir. Parts of the church and its façade were restored in September 2020 as part of funds available through the European Regional Development Fund.
- Church of the Assumption of the Blessed Virgin Mary: The church we see today was built in 1846 at the insistence of Rev Salvu Sammut Pullicino who wanted to build a church in the style that was popular at the time. The Ionic Facade is complemented with a Composite style interior. In World War II the church was used as a temporary home for refugees fleeing the Cottonera area. Later, it also served as a teaching space for the University of Malta Law students. Post war it was utilised as a store for statues and other street decorations used in the Village feasts. After its restoration it served as a chapel dedicated to adoration. In front of the church we find a statue of Our Lady which dates back to the early 19th century.
- Church of St Roque Situated on Three Churches Street, this chapel was built in 1593 with the outbreak of the Plague during that same year. Victims of this devastating disease were buried in the church. The main painting in the chapel shows St. Roque, St. Paul and St. Sebastian, all three protector saints against the deadly disease.
- Chapel of the Good Shepherd. This small chapel within the grounds of the Good Shepherd convent was dedicated to St Joseph. It was designed by architect Vincenzo Busuttil and its stone construction left in the able hands of Mason Piju Ebejer. It was inaugurated on 4 April 1870. A much larger church was built during the period of 1898–1901. This new building was dedicated to the Sacred Heart of Jesus. Archbishop Monsigneur Peter Pace blessed the chapel on 7 February 1901.

=== The reverence to St Roque ===
A common occurrence in many streets, buildings and historical sites around Malta is the reverence to Saint Roque. The belief is that Saint Roque is the protector saint against the plague and honouring him would protect the inhabitants against the Plague and any other form of contagious disease prevalent at the time. In Balzan there is a church, a street as well as a statue dedicated to Santu Rokku (Saint Roque). The statue is strategically placed at the corner of the street bearing the same name in order to oversee and protect the people living in the village.

=== Villas ===
Melita Gardens were part of the San Anton Palace, built by the Order of the Knights of St. John in the early 17th century and are now privately owned. Originally serving as the mistresses' quarters and were connected to the palace by means of a tunnel that is now inaccessible. In the late 19th century, it was restored in the Art Nouveau architectural style as a typical home of the Maltese aristocracy of the time. With its extensive gardens it remains a relic of the villas that once adorned most of Balzan. During the war, it served as a hotel and more recently as an entertainment venue.

=== Other cultural heritage property in Balzan ===
- Palazzo Bosio
- Villa Macedonia
- Church of San Anard
- Wignacourt Aqueduct

== Notable persons ==
- Gabriel Caruana Artist (1929–2018)
- Bishop Joseph Grech
- Giuseppe Frendo, insurgent Siege of Malta Balzan National Congress Representative
- Mikel Scicluna Professional Wrestler 29 July 1929 – 20 March 2010

== Religious organisations ==
- Good Shepherd Convent, also known as Tal-Bon Pastur, is a convent of the Good Shepherd Sisters who arrived in Malta from Smyrna in 1858. They were initially given a house in Lija by the Marquis Testaferrata to set up a boarding school for girls coming from Malta and Sicily. Today this building serves as the site for the Local Council, Social Services and Post Office within the village. They also offered classes for orphans and women who wanted to lead more meaningful lives. The convent in Balzan was built with the help of many benefactors in 1868. The work of the convent continues to be that of helping and offering women and their children shelter from domestic violence, helping single mothers and now also helping male refugess and their families who end up in Malta.
- The Franciscan Missionaries of Mary Convent was built in 1926. It housed a convent, a chapel and a school. Stella Maris School Malta adopted the Montessori system of teaching when it opened in 1944. A few years later, in 1950, the school was offering kindergarten classes along with the primary school for boys. Since 2008, Stella Maris School has been a feeder school for St Aloysius College where students move to gain their secondary education.
- The Neocatechumenal Way also known as 'Tal-Mixja' which falls within the Catholic Church. It was formed in Madrid in 1964 by Kiko Argüello and Carmen Hernández. It was opened in Balzan in 1984 through the catechists of the Way from the Mosta Paris. Currently has 4 communities and an up and coming "Katekumenju".

== Balzan Local Council ==
- Dr Angelo Micallef (Mayor)
- Mr Edward Grech (Deputy Mayor)
- Ms Annalise Galea ( Councillor)
- Dr Oliver Nicholas De Gaetano ( Councillor)
- Mrs. Mary Louise Briffa (Councillor)
- Ms Doriette Farrugia (Executive Secretary)

== Climate ==
Balzan has a Subtropical–Mediterranean climate (Köppen climate classification Csa), with very mild winters and warm to hot summers.

Climate data for Balzan
Month	Jan	Feb	Mar	Apr	May	Jun	Jul	Aug	Sep	Oct	Nov	Dec	Year
Mean daily maximum °C (°F)	16.1 (61.0)	16.0 (60.8)	17.8 (64.0)	20.0 (68.0)	24.2 (75.6)	28.5 (83.3)	31.5 (88.7)	31.8 (89.2)	28.4 (83.1)	25.2 (77.4)	21.0 (69.8)	17.5 (63.5)	23.16 (73.69)
Daily mean °C (°F)	13.2 (55.8)	13.0 (55.4)	14.6 (58.3)	16.7 (62.1)	20.4 (68.7)	24.4 (75.9)	27.2 (81.0)	27.7 (81.9)	25.0 (77.0)	21.9 (71.4)	18.0 (64.4)	14.7 (58.5)	19.73 (67.51)
Mean daily minimum °C (°F)	10.3 (50.5)	10.0 (50.0)	11.3 (52.3)	13.3 (55.9)	16.6 (61.9)	20.3 (68.5)	22.8 (73.0)	23.6 (74.5)	21.6 (70.9)	18.6 (65.5)	15.0 (59.0)	11.9 (53.4)	16.26 (61.27)
Average precipitation mm (inches)	94.7 (3.73)	63.4 (2.50)	37.0 (1.46)	26.3 (1.04)	9.2 (0.36)	5.4 (0.21)	0.2 (0.01)	6.0 (0.24)	67.4 (2.65)	77.2 (3.04)	108.6 (4.28)	107.7 (4.24)	603.1 (23.74)
Average precipitation days	15	12	9	6	3	1	0	1	5	9	13	16	90
Mean monthly sunshine hours	169.3	178.1	227.2	253.8	309.7	336.9	376.7	352.2	270.0	223.8	195.0	161.2	3,053.9
Source: maltaweather.com (Meteo Malta & MaltaMedia)

== Balzan community service ==
- Balzan Parish Church Office, Triq Idmejda
- Balzan Local Council, Triq Dun Spir Sammut www.balzan.lc.gov.mt
- Balzan Police Station, Pjazza Bertu Fenech
- Balzan Health Clinic, Triq il-Kbira
- Balzan Sub Post Office, Triq Dun Spir Sammut
- Balzan Neocatechumenal way, Triq L-Idmejda (https://knisja.mt/movimenti-kattolici/mixja-neokatekumenali/)
- Balzan Labour Party (Partit Laburista) Club, Triq it-Tliet Knejjes
- Balzan Nationalist Party (Partit Nazzjonalista) Club, Triq il-Kbira

== Sport organisations ==
- Balzan Football Club, founded in 1937, is a team competing at the premier level of Maltese football. The team has achieved consistently promising results throughout the last five years, reaching runner-up and finalist levels in the last few years. In 2019, they won the Maltese FA Trophy, beating contenders Valletta FC.

== Band clubs ==
- St. Gabriel Band Club (Każin Tal-Banda San Gabriel)
- Mary the Annunciation Philharmonic Society (Is-Soċjetà Filarmonika Marija Annunzjata)

== Places ==
- Church of the Annunciation (Pjazza Bertu Fenech / Triq il-Kbira)
- Good Shepherd Convent (Triq l-Idmejda)
- Katekumenju Mixja Neokatekumenali (Triq L-Idmejda)
- St. Aloysius Primary School formerly Stella Maris School (Triq San Franġisk)
- St. Francis Convent (Triq San Franġisk)
- The Three Churches (Triq it-Tliet Knejjes)
- Malta Hospice Movement (Vjal il-Buon Pastur)
- Fra Giuseppe Zammit Summer Residence (Behind Church)
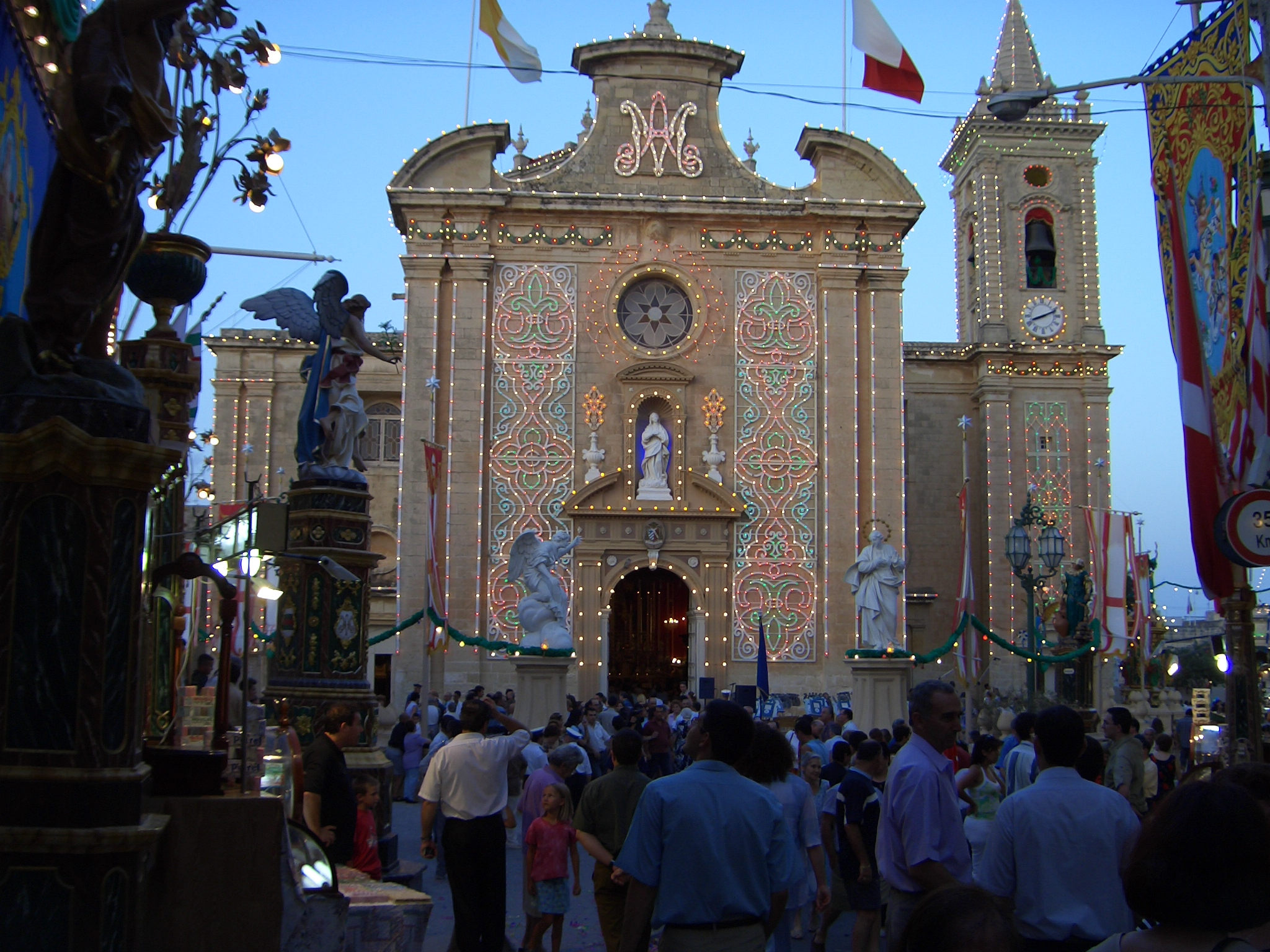
Parish church of Balzan during the festa

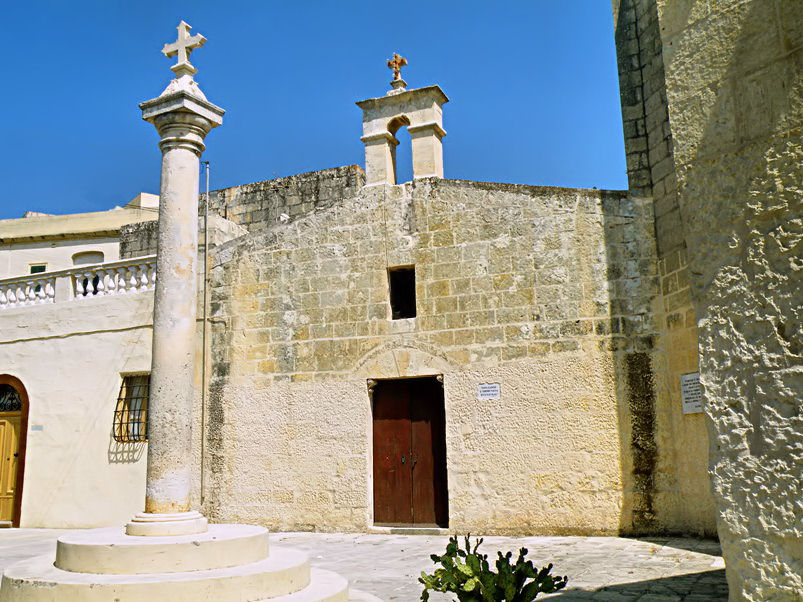
Old Announciation Church

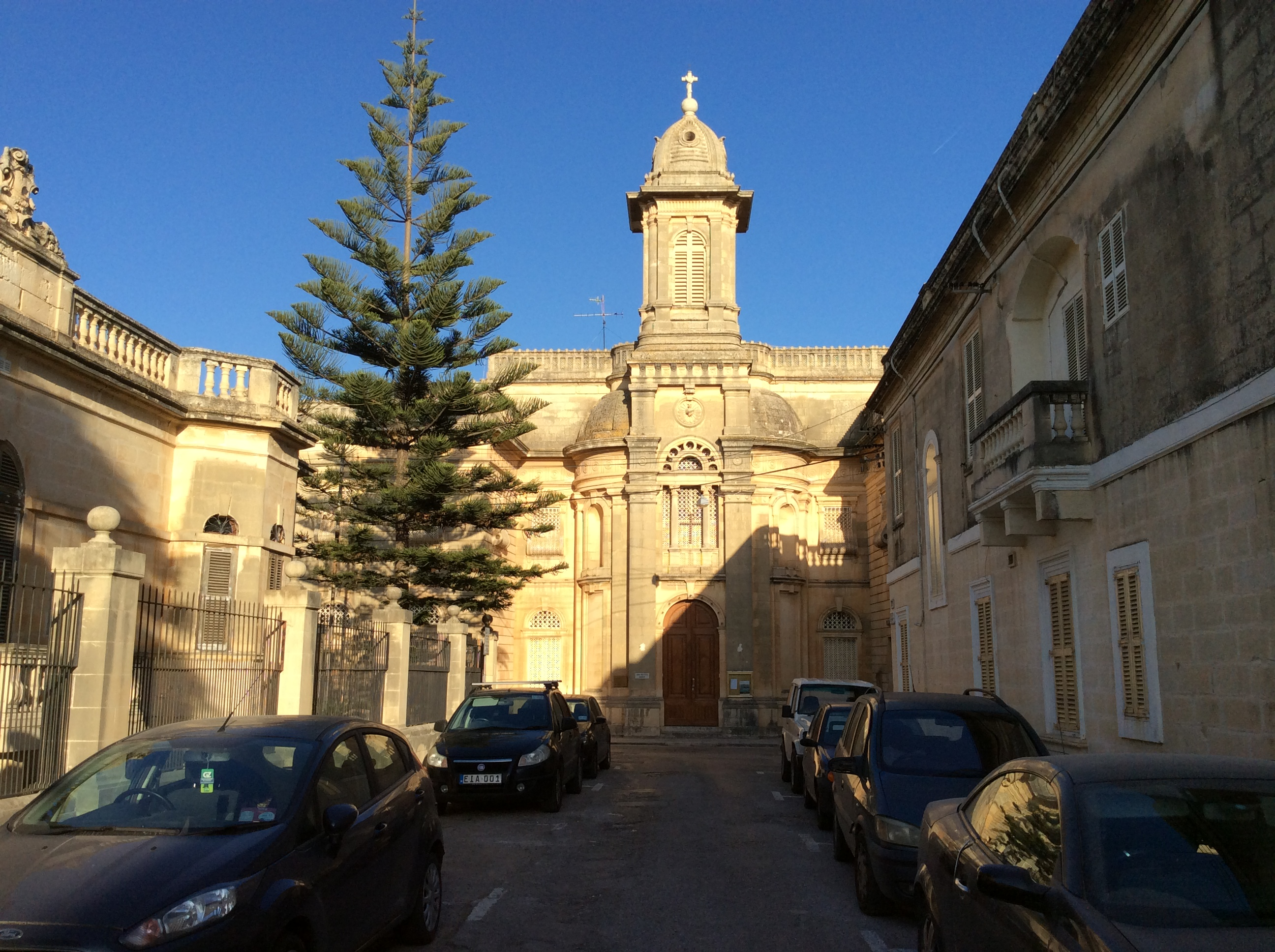
Church and convent of the Good Shepherd

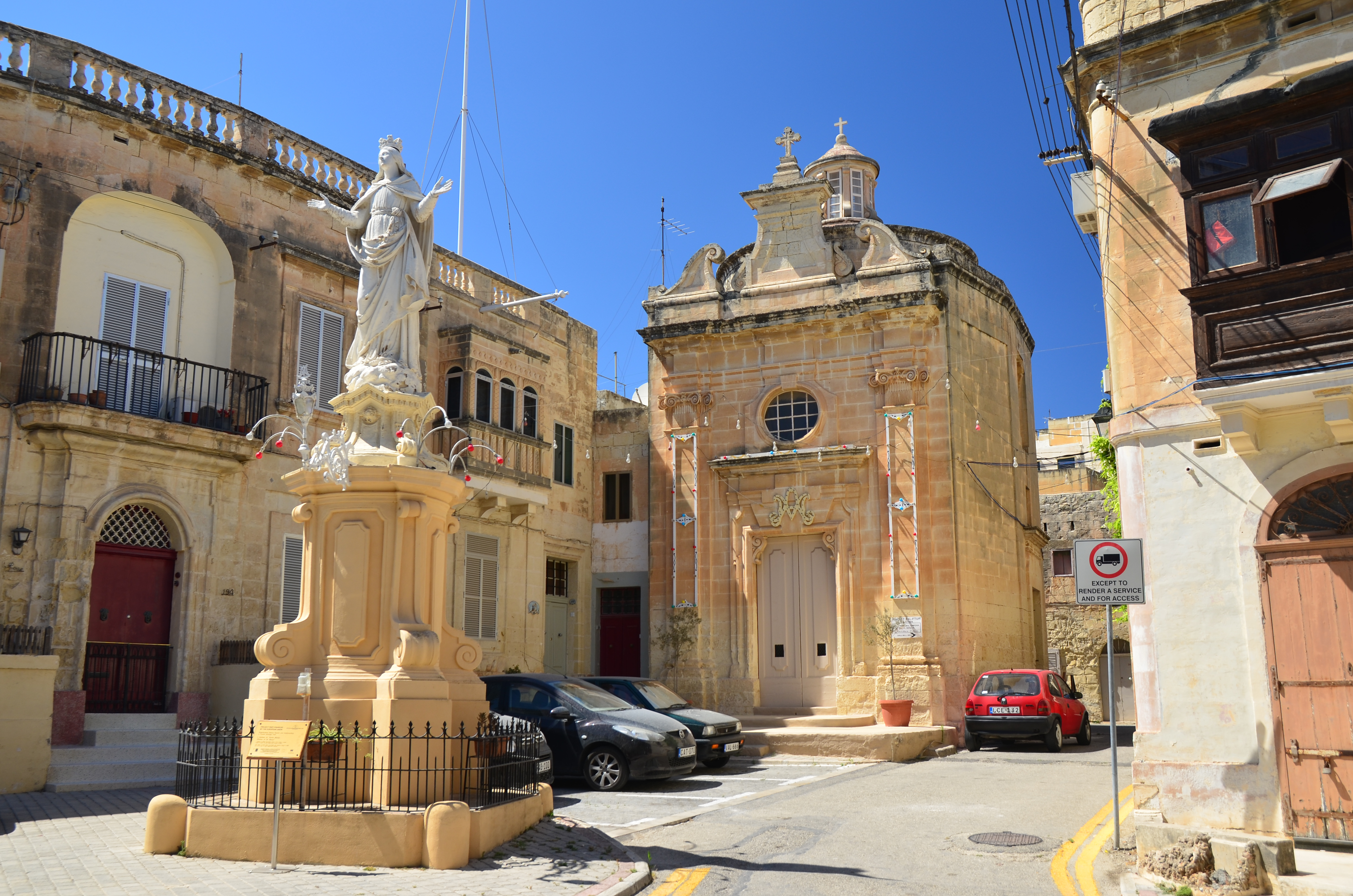
Church of St.Mary

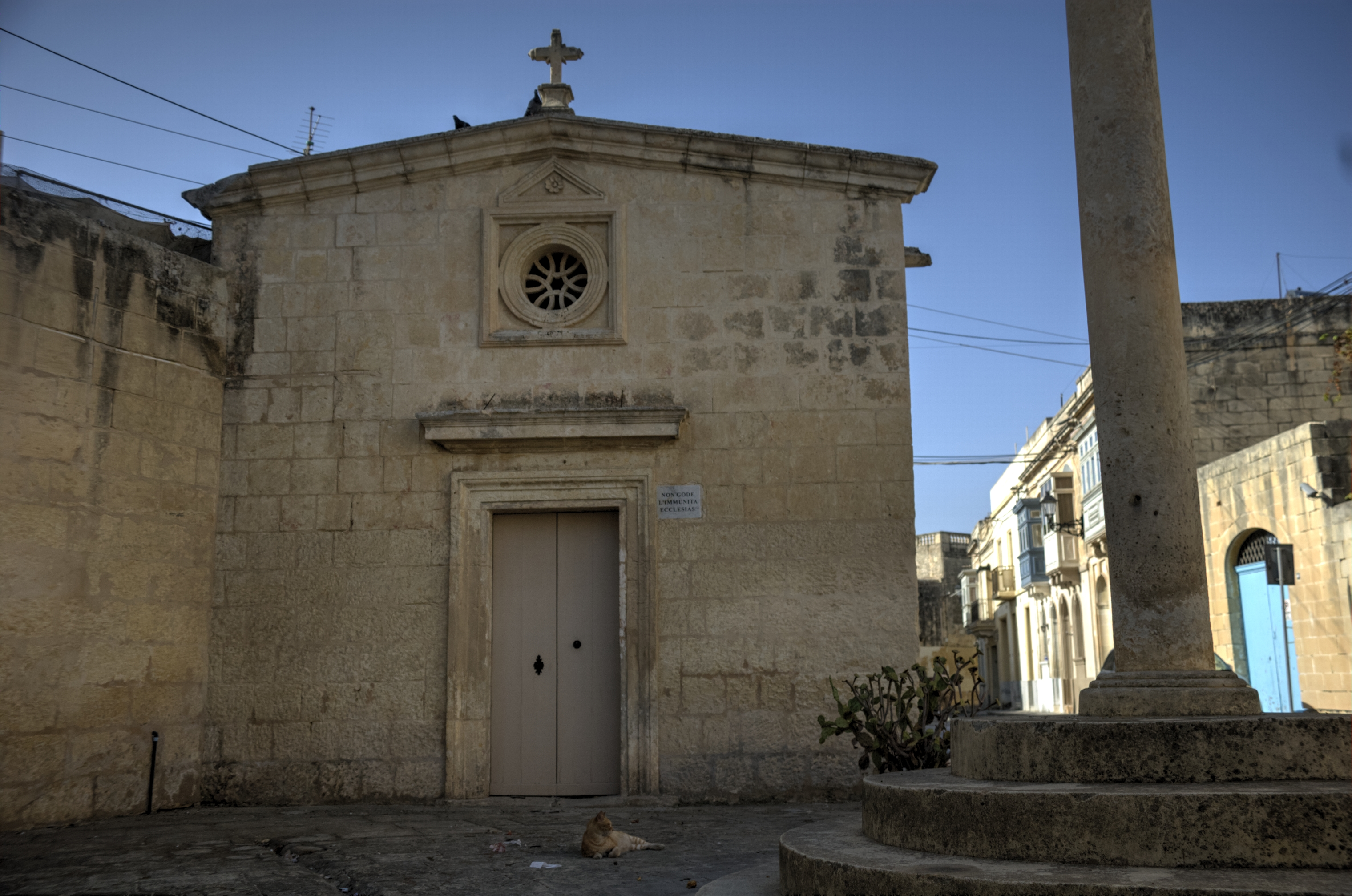
Church of St.Roque

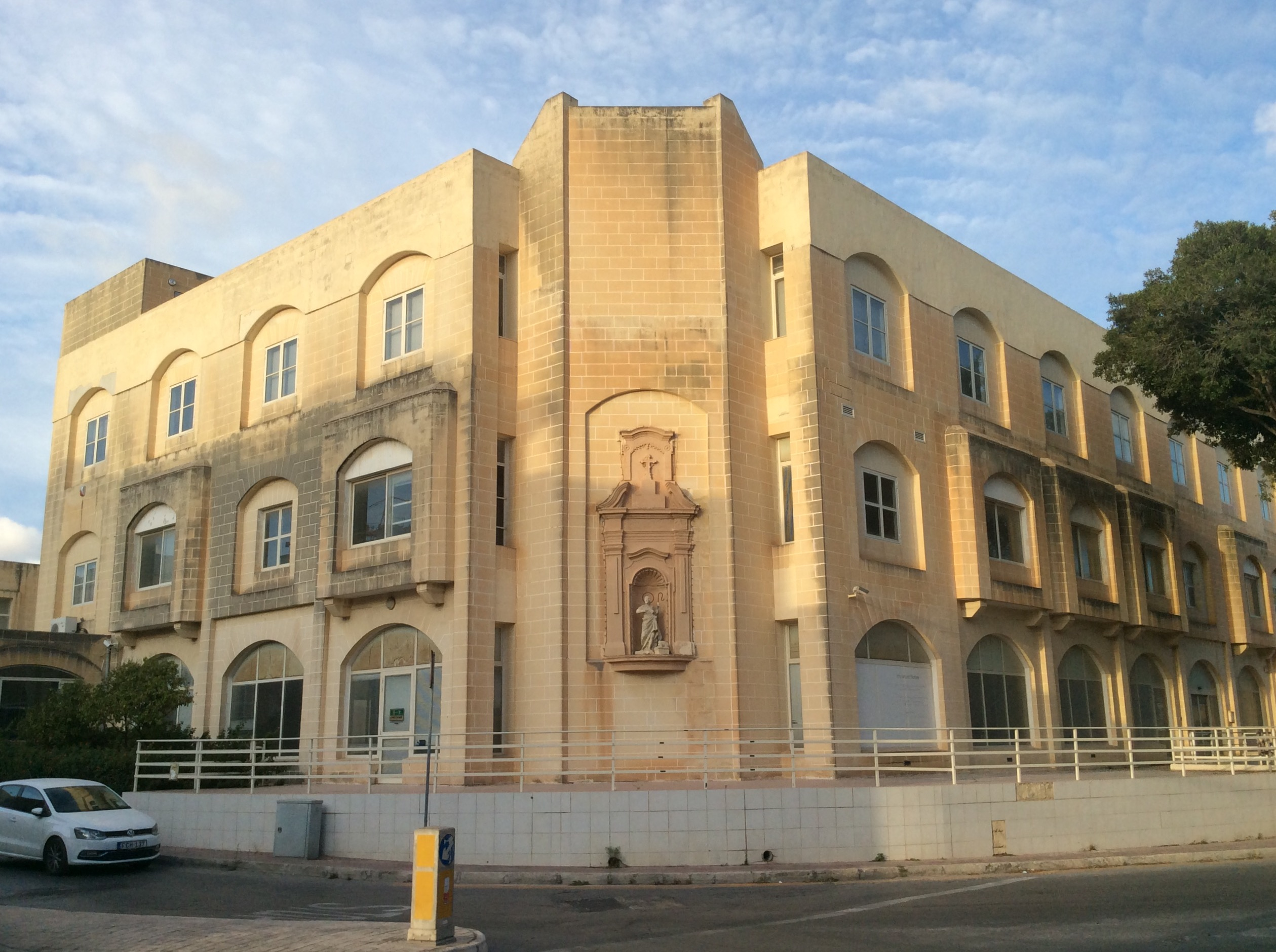
Niche of St Roque

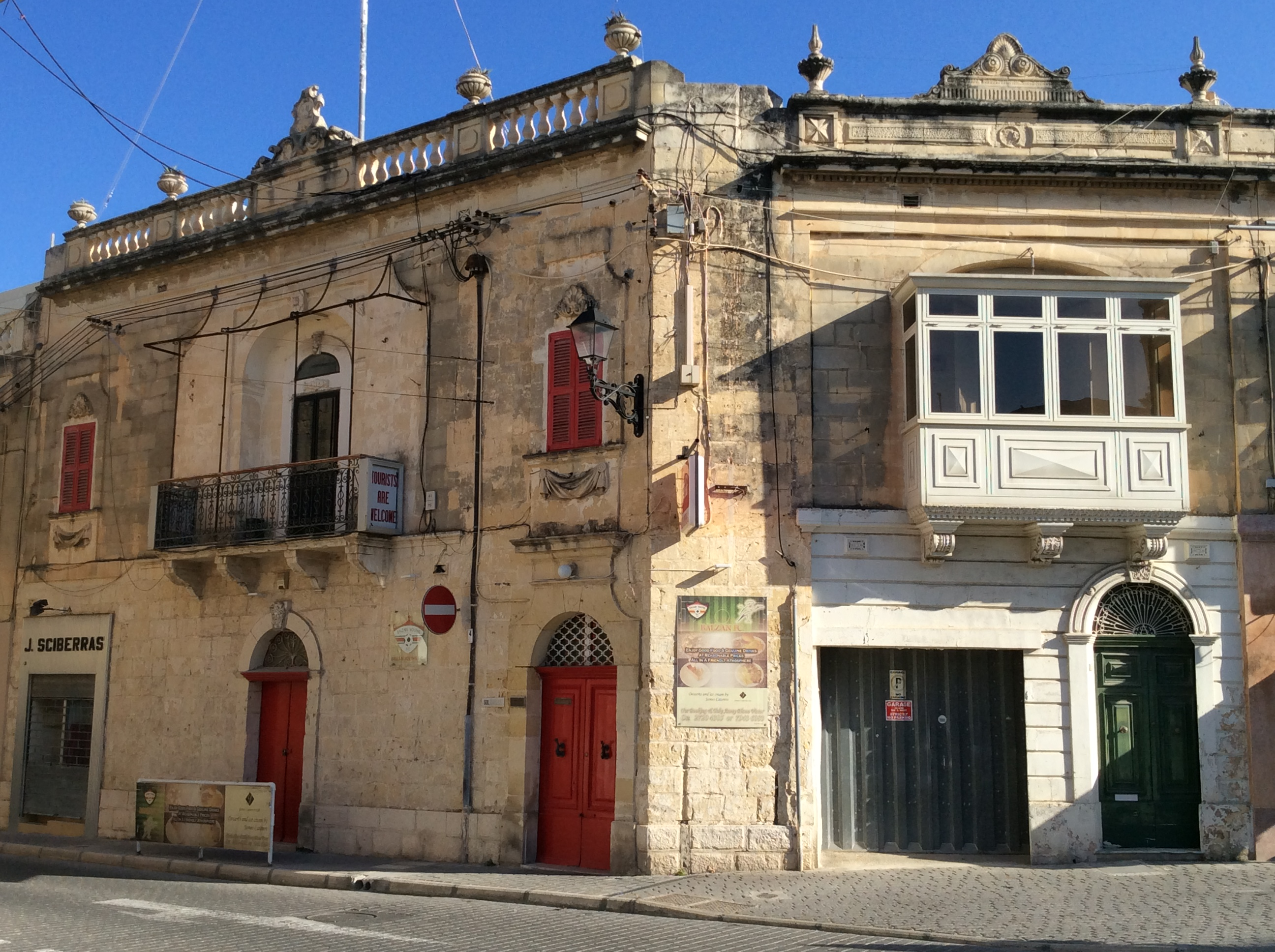
Pjazza Bertu Fenech

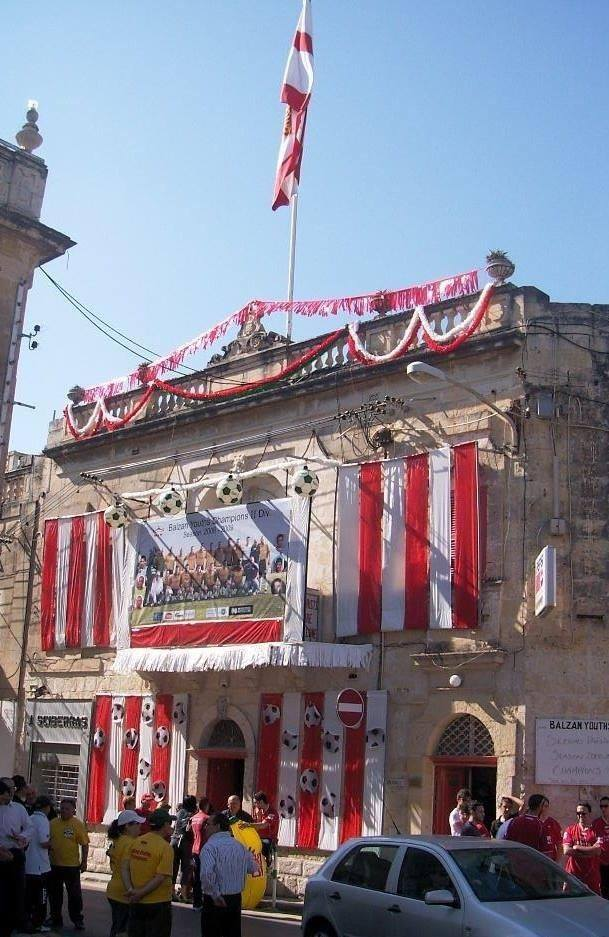
Solerville

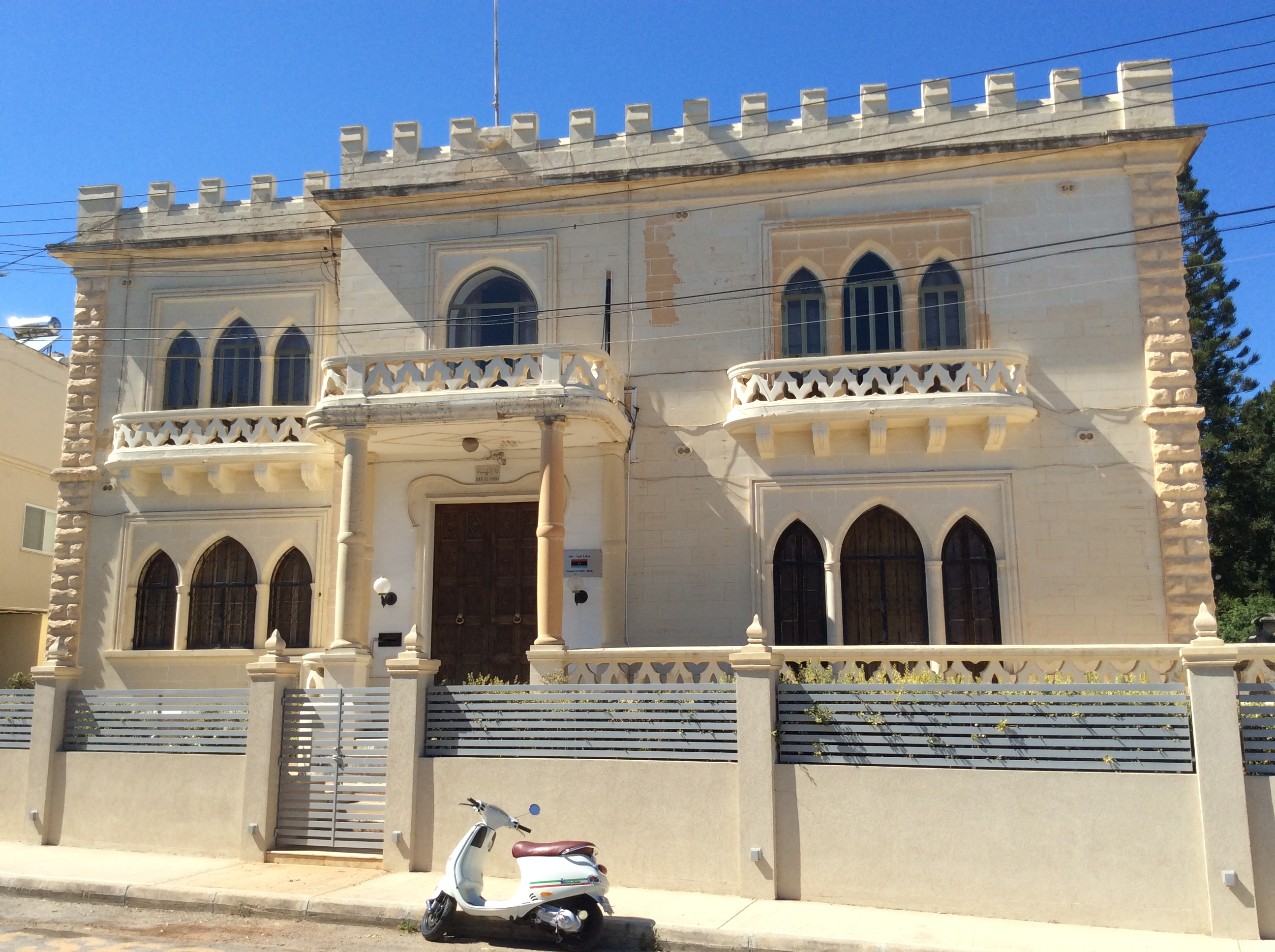
Dar El-Hana (Libyan Embassy)

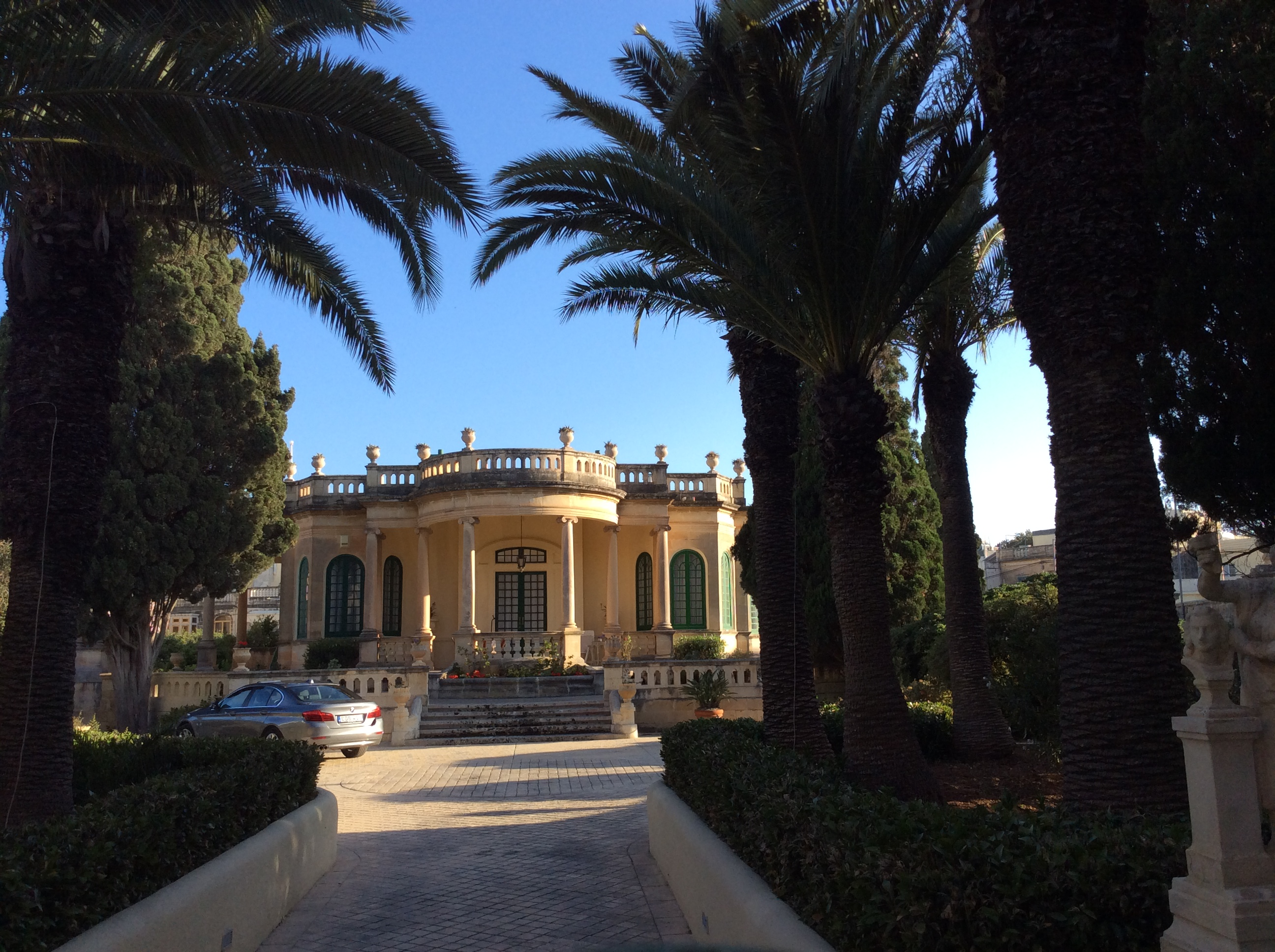
Villa Macedonia (Spanish Embassy)

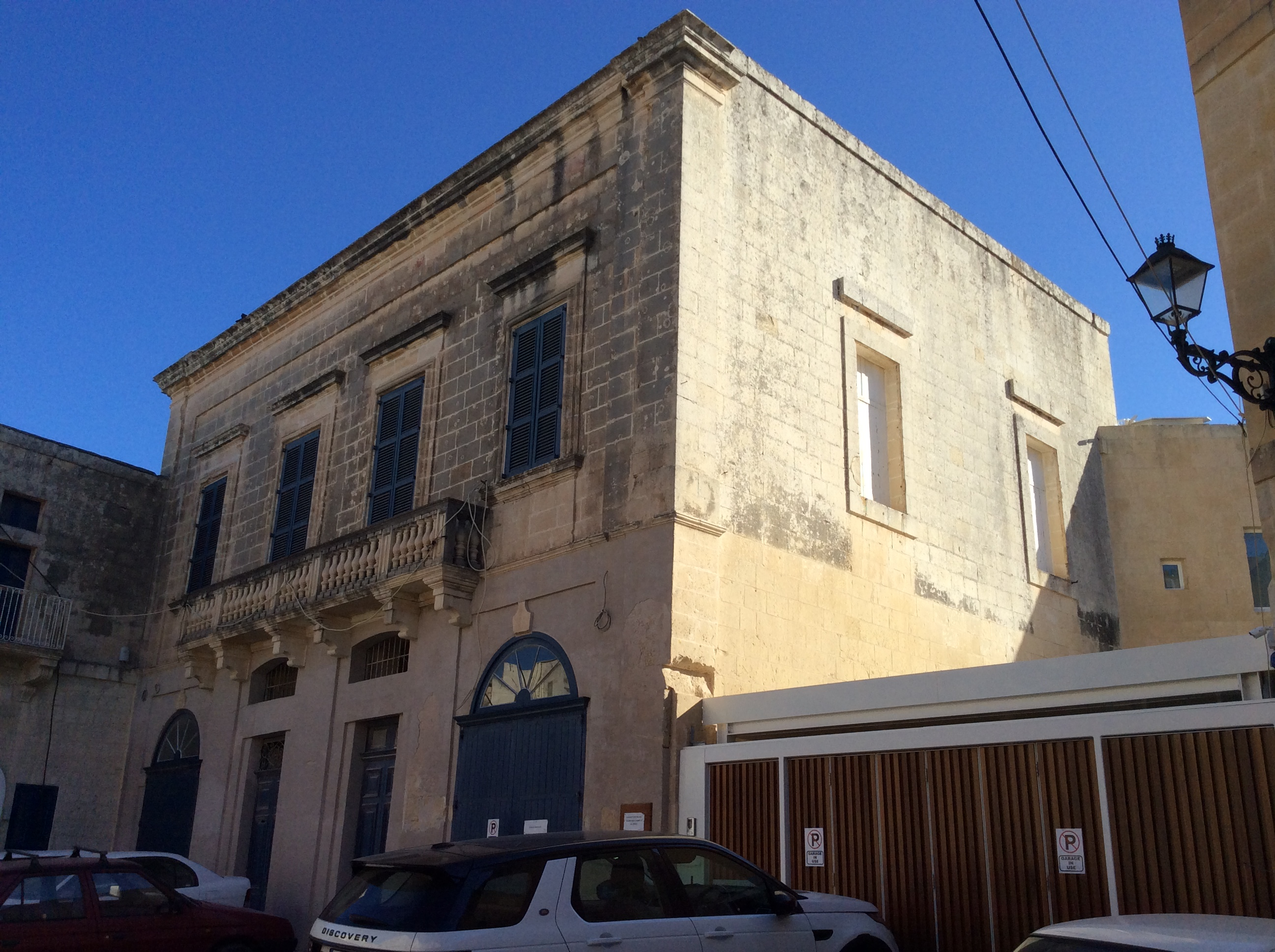
Palazzo Bosio, Triq it-Tlett Knejjes

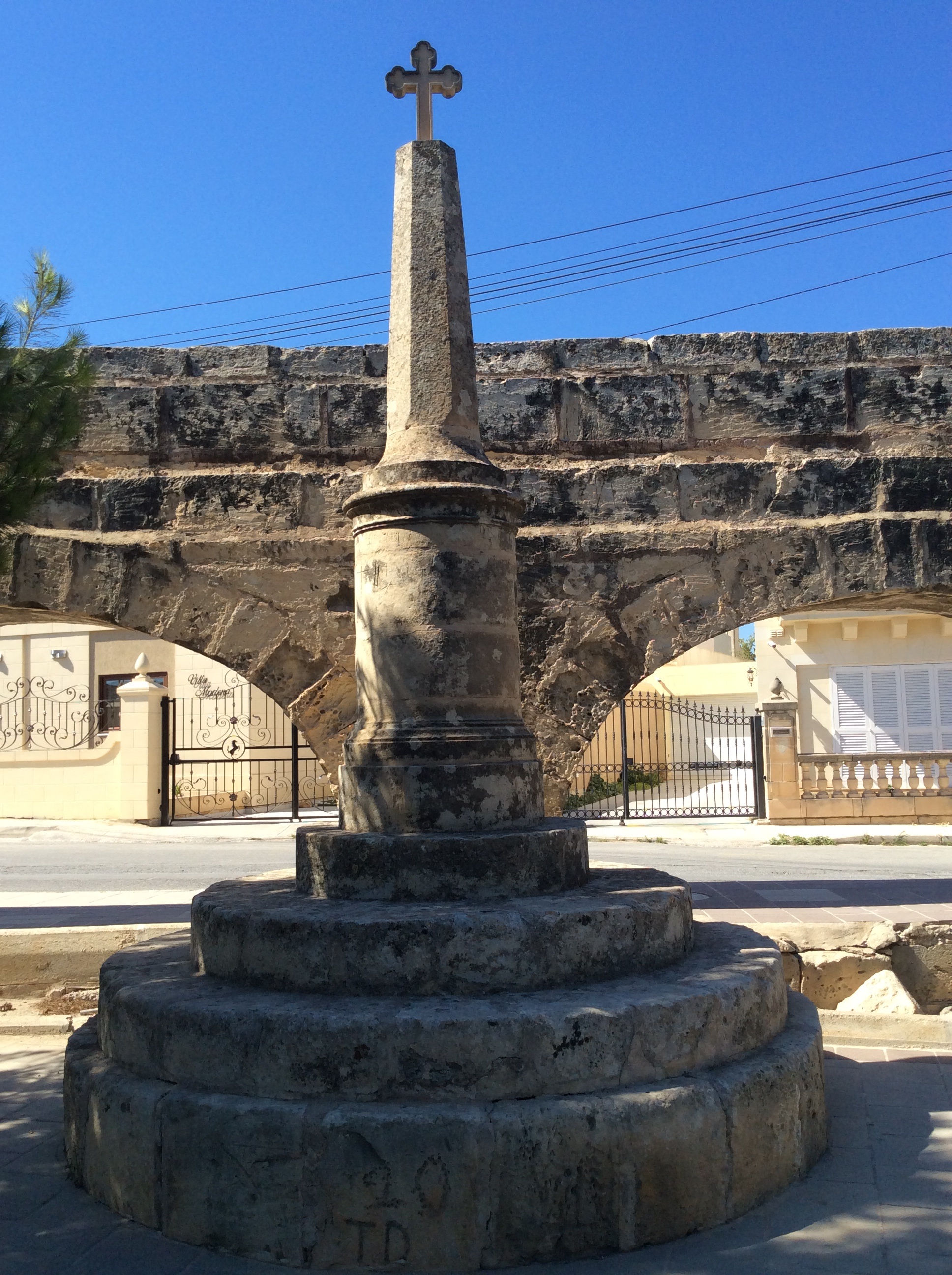
Aqueduct and cross

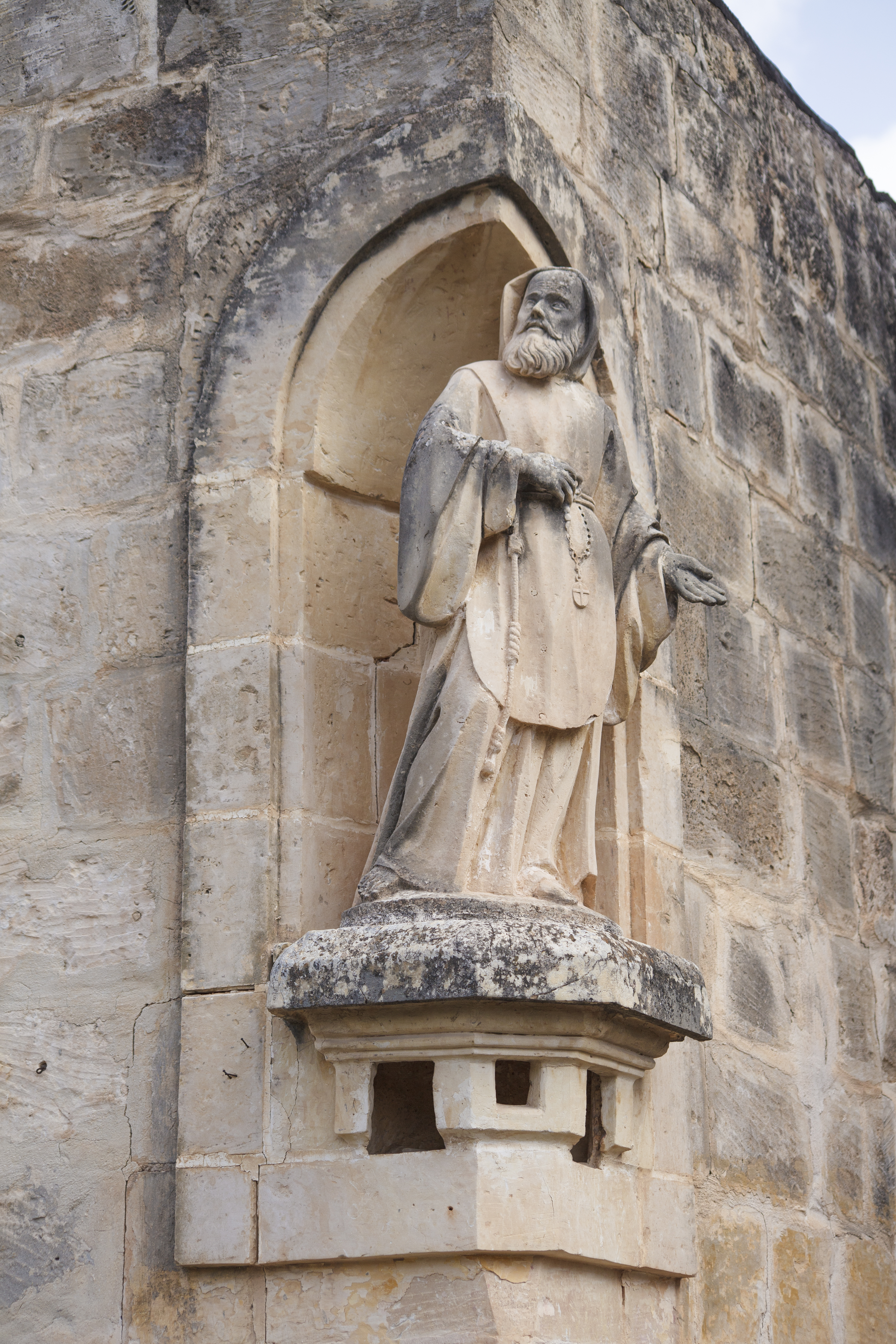
Niche of St Frances of Paola, an Italian mendicant friar. The oldest niche of Balzan.
