= Södersjukhuset =

- Stockholm County Council

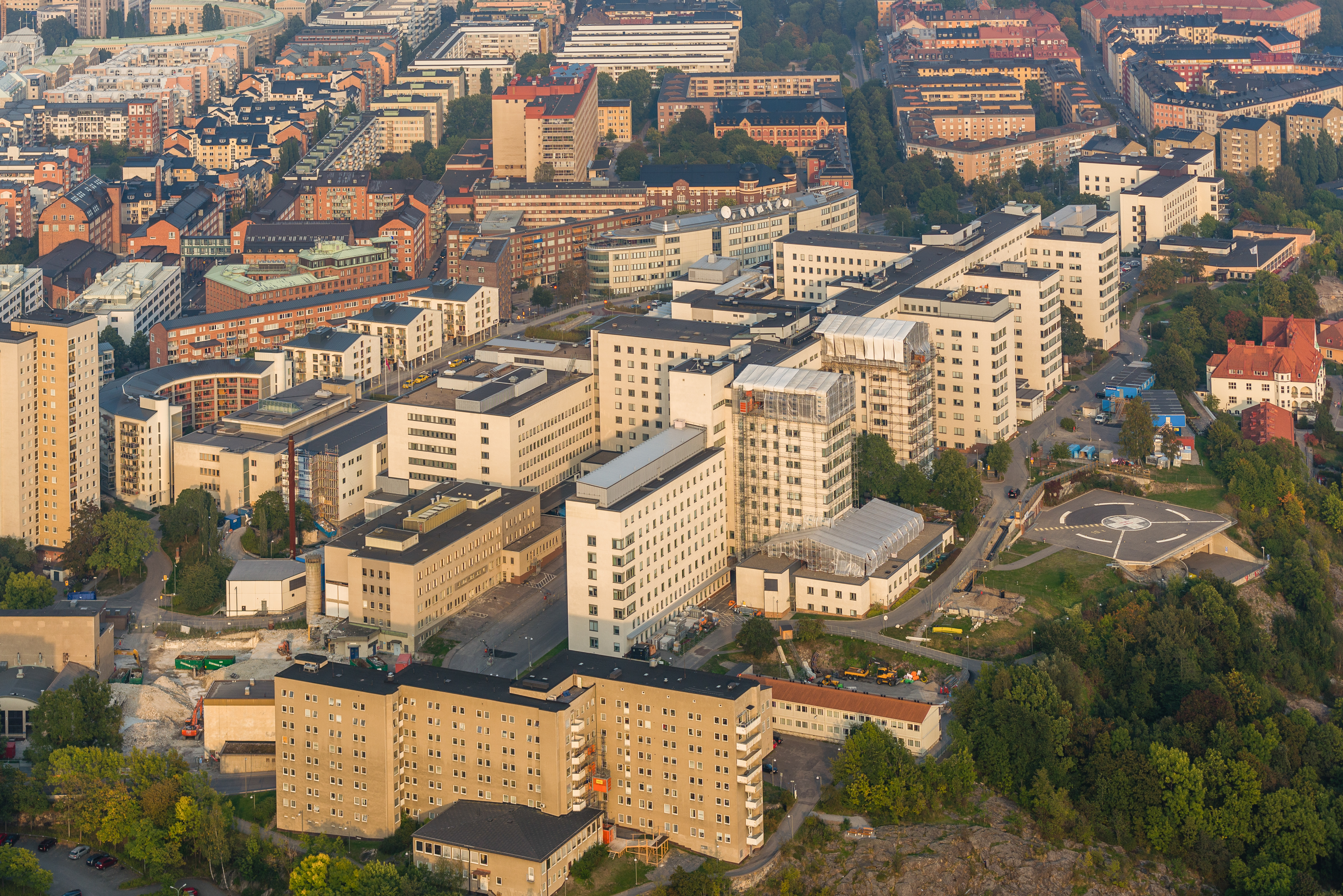
- The hospital viewed from the south-west

Geography
- Location: Södermalm, Stockholm, Sweden

Organisation
- Care system: Public
- Type: District General

Services
- Emergency department: Yes
- Beds: 647

Helipads
- Helipad: Yes (ICAO: ESHC)

History
- Founded: 3 April 1944

Links
- Website: sodersjukhuset.se

Södersjukhuset (Sös) is one of the largest district general hospital in Stockholm, Sweden. Constructed between 1937 and 1944, it was designed by architects Hjalmar Cederström and Hermann Imhäuser, and the construction was contracted to Toll Byggnads AB. Södersjukhuset has the largest emergency department in Scandinavia.

King Gustaf V inaugurated Södersjukhuset on 3 April 1944. At the time, the building was the largest in Scandinavia. New buildings were added to Södersjukhuset in the 1950s, and Södersjukhuset underwent major refurbishment between 2000 and 2003.

With more than 4,000 employees, Södersjukhuset is the third largest employer in Stockholm.

The hospital has an underground complex measuring 4,500 square meters (48,500 square feet) called DEMC (Disaster Emergency Center), which was completed and inaugurated on 25 November 1994. In peacetime the complex is used for training and scientific research. In case of disaster or war the complex is fully operational as a normal hospital, with backup electricity, water, radio and telecommunication supplies available in such cases. The DEMC is situated close to the Årstaviken river. Plans for an underground hospital (originally intended to be solely for military use) were however already present in the initial plans for Södersjukhuset in the 1930s, and a 550 metre long tunnel branching off from the Södra station–Hammarbyhamnen–Stadsgården freight branch line, as well as a massive cavern linking to said tunnel, were built along with the hospital itself. However with the end of World War II just over a year later in 1945, the underground military hospital was subsequently deemed unnecessary and the cavern was later used as a storage area for many years before being rebuilt as the DEMC in the early-1990s.

== Notable patients ==
- Mona Malm - (died 12 January 2021) actress
