= Underground hospital =

Type of wartime hospital

An underground hospital is a hospital that is constructed underground to protect patients and staff from attack during war. They were often used during World War II but very few now remain operational.

== History ==
=== Medieval ===
==== Ceppo Hospital of Pistoia in Italy ====
The Ceppo Hospital of Pistoia was founded in 1277 in a labyrinth of tunnels under the city and is one of the oldest continuously operating hospitals in the world.

=== World War I ===
==== Carriere Suzanne in France ====
“Carriere Suzanne“ was an underground hospital built during the second World War in a limestone quarry the “Carrieres de Montigny”, north of Compiègne.

==== Carrière Wellington in France ====
A hospital was built inside tunnels under Arras, named Carrière Wellington, with facilities for 700 beds.

=== World War II ===
==== Hohlgangsanlage 8 in Jersey ====
Hohlgangsanlage 8 was an artillery storage tunnel build by Organisation Todt workers for the Germans during World War II in St. Lawrence, Jersey, which was converted to a hospital to deal with casualties after the Normandy landings on 6 June 1944. The tunnel complex is open to the public during the summer months.

==== Hohlgangsanlage 7/40 in Guernsey ====
Hohlgangsanlage 7/40 (Ho.7/40) two interconnected cave passage installations of 7,000m², were built in 1942-43 by German Fortress Engineer and Organisation Todt workers to store vehicles, ammunition, food, fuel and equipment. Part of Ho. 7/40 was equipped and used for a short while in 1944 as a hospital, as the planned hospital tunnel had not been built, however patients underground did not recuperate very well. The tunnel complex is open to the public during the summer months.

==== Mtarfa Hospital in Malta ====
During the Second World War, the Mtarfa Hospital was reorganized as the 90th General Hospital and expanded to accommodate a maximum of 1200 beds. An underground hospital was excavated under the military hospital.

== Current ==
=== Israel ===
Israel currently has at least four hospitals with dedicated underground facilities.

==== Sourasky Medical Center ====
Tel Aviv Sourasky Medical Center is the main hospital serving Tel Aviv, Israel. It is the third-largest hospital complex in the country.

In 2011, a 700-1,000 bed bombproof emergency facility was opened. The building, with 13 stories above ground and four stories underground, provides protection against conventional, chemical and biological attack. Construction began in 2008. The cost of the building was $110 million, with a donation of $45 million from Israeli billionaire Sammy Ofer. The architect was Arad Sharon, grandson of Arieh Sharon who designed the original facility.

==== Rambam Hospital ====
Rambam Health Care Campus the largest medical center in northern Israel and fifth largest in Israel, began in October 2010 work on a protected emergency underground hospital designed to withstand conventional, chemical, and biological attacks. The project included a three-floor parking lot that could be transformed at short notice into a 2,000-bed hospital. The hospital can generate its own power and store enough oxygen, drinking water and medical supplies for up to three days.

==== Beilinson Hospital ====
The 90 million shekel fortified emergency room at Beilinson Hospital in Petach Tikvah has gone operational, becoming Israel’s largest ER. The 5,000 square meter (58,000 square feet) facility is capable of treating 200,000 patients annually. There is also a trauma center capable of addressing numerous patients simultaneously.

==== Hadassah Medical Center ====
Hadassah Medical Center has undergorund facilities at both its Mount Scopus and Ein Kerem facilities in Jerusalem.

=== Sweden ===
==== Södersjukhuset ====
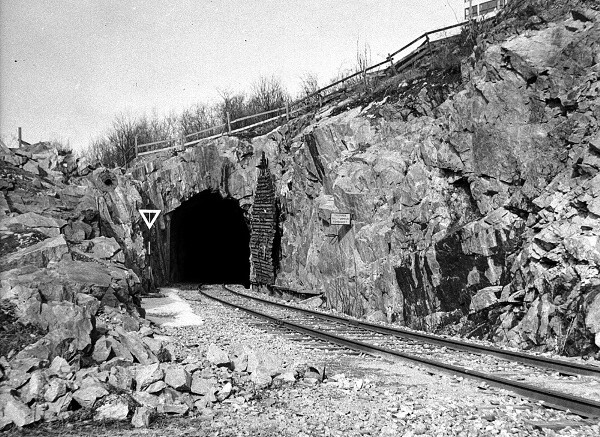
The rail entrance to the complex at Södersjukhuset, 1940s.

The hospital Södersjukhuset in Stockholm has an underground complex measuring 4,700 square meters (50,600 square feet) called DEMC (Disaster Emergency Center), which was completed and inaugurated on 25 November 1994. In peacetime the complex is used for training and scientific research. In case of disaster or war the complex is fully operational as a normal hospital, it has 270 beds in peacetime and 160 in wartime.

=== Syria ===
Doctors and international N.G.O.s have created an elaborate network of underground hospitals throughout Syria. They have installed cameras in intensive-care units, so that doctors abroad can monitor patients by Skype and direct technicians to administer proper treatment.

==== Aleppo ====
In 2016, because of the number of hospitals that have been damaged or destroyed in the city, hospitals have moved underground.

==== Ghouta ====
The 2019 Syrian-Danish documentary film The Cave is about a makeshift underground hospital nicknamed "the Cave" in Eastern Ghouta.
