= 2005–06 Maltese Second Division =

Maltese Second Division
- Season: 2005–06

The 2005–06 Maltese Second Division (known as BOV Second Division 2005-06 due to sponsorship reasons) started on 24 September 2005 and ended on 8 May 2006.

== Participating teams ==
- Attard
- Balzan Youths
- Dingli Swallows
- Gharghur
- Gozo FC
- Gudja United
- Gzira United
- Melita
- Mellieha
- Qormi
- Vittoriosa Stars
- Zebbug Rangers

== Changes from previous season ==
- Tarxien Rainbows and St.Andrews were promoted to 2005–06 Maltese First Division. They were replaced with Balzan Youths and Gozo FC, both relegated from 2004–05 Maltese First Division.
- Santa Venera Lightning and Rabat Ajax were relegated to 2005–06 Maltese Third Division. They were replaced with Gudja United and Gharghur, both promoted from 2004–05 Maltese Third Division.

== Final standings ==
Pos	Team	Pld	W	D	L	GF	GA	GD	Pts	Promotion or relegation
1	Qormi (C)	22	15	5	2	48	20	+28	50	Champions and promotion to 2006–07 Maltese First Division
2	Vittoriosa Stars	22	12	8	2	34	16	+18	44	Promotion to 2006–07 Maltese First Division
3	Mellieha	22	10	7	5	39	22	+17	37	
4	Dingli Swallows	22	8	11	3	28	16	+12	35	
5	Balzan Youths	22	9	3	10	36	33	+3	30	
6	Gozo FC	22	7	8	7	24	31	−7	29	
7	Gudja United	22	7	6	9	26	28	−2	27	
8	Zebbug Rangers	22	6	9	7	13	16	−3	27	
9	Melita	22	7	5	10	32	29	+3	26	
10	Gzira United (R)	22	6	7	9	26	34	−8	25	Relegation playoffs
11	Attard (R)	22	5	4	13	17	50	−33	19	Relegation to 2006–07 Maltese Third Division
12	Gharghur (R)	22	2	3	17	17	48	−31	9	Relegation to 2006–07 Maltese Third Division

(C) Champions; (R) Relegated

== Relegation playoffs ==
Pos	Team	Pld	W	D	L	GF	GA	GD	Pts	Promotion, qualification or relegation	RAB	SIR	STL	GŻI
1	Rabat Ajax (P)	3	3	0	0	6	1	+5	9	Promotion to the Second Division	—		1–0	
2	Sirens	3	1	1	1	1	1	0	4		0–1	—		
3	Santa Lucia	3	1	0	2	5	2	+3	3			0–1	—	5–0
4	Gżira United (R)	3	0	1	2	1	9	−8	1	Relegation to the Third Division	1–4	0–0		—

Source: RSSSF
(P) Promoted; (R) Relegated

== Top scorers ==
Goals	Player	Team
19	(Malta) Antoine Sacco	Balzan
16	(Nigeria) Ibrahim Tarik	Mellieha
13	(Malta) Matthew Borg I	Melita
13	(Malta) Johann Zammit	Qormi
12	(Malta) Andrew Scerri	Qormi
12	(Malta) Wayne Borg St.John	Mellieha

== Results ==
Home \ Away	ATT	BAL	DIN	GHA	GOZ	GUD	GZI	MLT	MLL	QOR	VIT	ZEB
Attard		2–1	2–0	1–0	1–2	0–4	0–2	1–1	2–2	0–5	0–2	0–0
Balzan	3–0		1–2	7–0	2–0	1–0	0–1	0–2	2–0	0–2	0–4	3–1
Dingli	7–0	2–2		3–0	1–1	3–1	1–1	0–0	0–0	0–0	0–0	1–0
Gharghur	0–1	1–3	1–2		6–3	0–2	3–4	0–0	0–6	0–2	1–2	0–0
Gozo	3–0	3–1	1–1	0–0		1–1	2–0	2–1	2–1	1–3	0–0	0–0
Gudja	3–2	3–2	0–1	1–0	0–0		2–2	2–2	0–3	1–2	0–2	0–1
Gzira	3–0	1–2	0–1	1–0	1–1	1–1		1–6	1–0	1–3	1–2	0–0
Melita	1–2	3–1	0–0	1–2	4–0	0–2	3–2		2–0	0–1	0–2	1–2
Mellieha	3–0	3–1	1–1	4–3	3–1	2–0	1–1	3–1		0–0	1–1	0–1
Qormi	2–1	1–1	3–1	3–0	3–0	2–1	5–2	2–0	1–3		1–2	2–2
Vittoriosa	1–1	1–2	2–1	1–0	2–0	1–1	0–0	4–2	1–2	3–3		0–0
Zebbug	1–0	1–1	0–0	1–0	0–1	0–1	1–0	0–2	1–1	1–2	0–1	

Legend: Blue = home team win; Yellow = draw; Red = away team win.
