= 2007–08 Maltese First Division =

Maltese First Division
- Season: 2007–08
- Champions: Tarxien Rainbows
- Promoted: Tarxien Rainbows; Qormi
- Relegated: Mellieħa; Marsa
- Goals scored: 294
- Average goals/game: 3.26
- Top goalscorer: Anthony Eviparker (15)

The 2007–08 Maltese First Division (known as 2007–08 BOV First Division for sponsorship reasons) started on October 9, 2007 and ended on May 23, 2008. Marsa and St. George's were the teams which were relegated from the 2006–07 Maltese Premier League. Dingli Swallows and Mellieha were the promoted teams from the 2006–07 Maltese Second Division. Tarxien Rainbows finished as champions and were promoted to the 2008–09 Maltese Premier League. They were joined with Qormi, who won a play-off with Mosta 4-3 on penalties, following a 0-0 draw. The play-off was necessary because the two teams finished level on points. Mellieħa and Marsa were relegated to the 2008–09 Maltese Second Division. Mellieha had just been promoted but went straight down. Marsa suffered two straight relegations, having been relegated from the Premier League.

== Teams ==
The Maltese First Division 2007–08 was made up of these teams:

- Dingli Swallows
- Marsa
- Mellieħa
- Mosta
- Qormi
- Senglea Athletic
- St. Georges
- St.Patrick
- Tarxien Rainbows
- Vittoriosa Stars

== Changes from previous season ==
- Ħamrun Spartans and Mqabba were promoted to the Premier League. They were replaced with St. Georges and Marsa, both relegated from 2006–07 Maltese Premier League.
- San Ġwann and Naxxar Lions were relegated to 2007–08 Maltese Second Division. They were replaced with Dingli Swallows and Mellieħa.

== League table ==
Pos	Team	Pld	W	D	L	GF	GA	GD	Pts	Promotion or relegation
1	Tarxien Rainbows (C)	18	12	3	3	32	17	+15	39	Promotion to 2008–09 Maltese Premier League
2	Mosta	18	11	4	3	34	18	+16	37	Promotion Playoffs
3	Qormi	18	11	4	3	37	22	+15	37	Promotion Playoffs
4	Senglea Athletic	18	10	1	7	32	23	+9	31	
5	Dingli Swallows	18	8	3	7	34	27	+7	27	
6	Vittoriosa Stars	18	8	1	9	33	29	+4	25	
7	St. George's	18	6	3	9	27	33	−6	21	
8	St. Patrick	18	4	4	10	21	27	−6	16	
9	Mellieħa (R)	18	3	4	11	21	43	−22	13	Relegation to 2008–09 Maltese Second Division
10	Marsa (R)	18	3	1	14	23	55	−32	10	Relegation to 2008–09 Maltese Second Division

(C) Champions; (R) Relegated

== Promotion Play off ==
Team 1	Score	Team 2
Qormi	0–0 (a.e.t.) (4–3 p)	Mosta

- The playoff was played due to Mosta and Qormi finished level on points.
- Qormi promoted.

== Results ==
Home \ Away	DIN	MAR	MEL	MOS	QOR	SEN	STG	STP	TAR	VIT
Dingli Swallows	—	6–2	2–2	0–2	2–0	0–1	2–2	2–0	1–3	0–0
Marsa	0–3	—	0–1	2–4	3–4	0–5	1–3	1–0	2–3	1–4
Mellieħa	0–2	1–3	—	1–2	4–3	1–3	0–1	2–2	2–2	3–6
Mosta	4–0	0–3	3–0	—	2–2	3–1	2–0	2–0	0–1	2–1
Qormi	4–2	1–1	3–0	3–3	—	1–0	1–0	1–0	4–1	0–1
Senglea Athletic	0–4	5–2	4–0	2–1	1–3	—	2–0	0–4	0–1	1–0
St. George's	4–2	6–0	1–2	2–2	0–0	0–4	—	2–1	2–0	3–7
St. Patrick	0–2	1–1	3–1	0–1	1–3	1–1	4–1	—	1–1	1–3
Tarxien Rainbows	2–1	4–0	3–0	0–0	0–2	1–0	1–0	3–0	—	3–2
Vittoriosa Stars	1–3	2–1	2–1	0–1	1–2	1–2	2–0	0–2	0–3	—

Legend: Blue = home team win; Yellow = draw; Red = away team win.

== Top scorers ==
As of 18 May 2008

Rank	Player	Club	Goals
1	(Nigeria) Anthony Eviparker	Vittoriosa Stars	15
2	(Nigeria) Anthony Ewurum	Senglea Athletic	13
3	(Malta) Chris Ciappara	Dingli Swallows	12
4	(Malta) Warren Chircop	Marsa	10
5	(Malta) Carlos Camenzuli	Mosta	9
5	(Malta) Joseph Farrugia	Qormi	9
