= 2021–22 Maltese Futsal Knockout Cup =

2021–22 Maltese futsal competition

Tournament details
- Host country: Malta
- Dates: 13 May 2022 - 1 June 2022
- Teams: 11

Final positions
- Champions: University of Malta Futsal
- Runners-up: Luxol

2021–22 Maltese Futsal Knockout Cup was a futsal competition in Malta, organized in a single-elimination format. Eleven teams entered the tournament, which began on 13 May 2022 and concluded with the final on 1 June 2022. University of Malta Futsal claimed the title after a 6–2 victory over Luxol in the final.

== Preliminary Round ==
Team 1	Score	Team 2
Ta' Xbiex	2–8	Valletta
University of Malta	6–2	Naxxar Lions
Siggiewi	8–7	Marsaskala Legends

== Quarter-Finals ==
Team 1	Score	Team 2
St George's Bormla	6–2	Qormi FC Futsa
Luxol St Andrews	7–3	Valletta
Mellieha	2–14	University of Malta
Siggiewi	7–2	Zurrieq

== Semi-Finals ==
Team 1	Score	Team 2
St George's Bormla	3–8	Luxol St Andrews
University of Malta	7–3	Siggiewi

== Final ==
Team 1	Score	Team 2
University of Malta	6–2	Luxol St Andrews

== External sources ==
- FutsalPlanet – Competitions overview
