= Ryan Fenech =

Maltese footballer

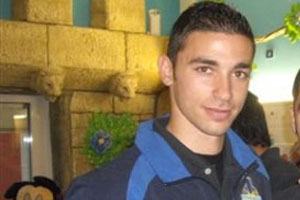

Personal information
- Date of birth: 20 April 1986 (age 40)
- Place of birth: Ħamrun, Malta
- Position: Midfielder

Team information
- Current team: Birkirkara
- Number: 36

Youth career
- Ħamrun Spartans

Senior career*
Years	Team	Apps	(Gls)
2003–2011	Ħamrun Spartans	94	(8)
2009–2010	→ Sliema Wanderers (loan)	24	(2)
2011–2015	Valletta	59	(9)
2011–2012	→ Sliema Wanderers (loan)	14	(5)
2015–2018	Balzan	42	(2)
2018–2019	Sliema Wanderers	21	(2)
2019–2021	Birkirkara	10	(0)

International career
	Malta U-21	8	(1)
2008–2019	Malta	49	(1)
- * Club domestic league appearances and goals

Ryan Fenech (born 20 April 1986) is a Maltese former professional footballer who played as a midfielder.

== Playing career ==
=== Ħamrun Spartans ===
Ryan Fenech joined Ħamrun Spartans as a trainee, and made his debut for the club during the 2002–03 season, although Ħamrun Spartans found themselves in the relegation group, Fenech helped his side to a seventh-place finish, during the season Ryan made six appearances and scored one goal.

Ryan started to establish himself in the first team, but unfortunately Ħamrun Spartans finished the season in 10th, bottom position in the Maltese Premier League for the 2003–04 season. During the season Ryan made ten appearances.

Fenech and Ħamrun Spartans heartache was short lived as the club gained an immediate return to the Maltese Premier League, as the club finished as champions in the Maltese First Division for the 2004–05 season.

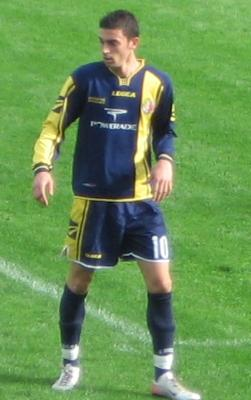
Ryan Fenech in action for Ħamrun Spartans.

The 2005–06 season saw Ryan and Ħamrun Spartans return to the Maltese Premier League, and the hope that they could retain their Premier League status, however it was to be another disappointing season for Ryan Fenech, as Ħamrun Spartans finished in 10th position and were again relegated to the First Division, during the season Fenech made 20 appearances and scored two goals.

Ryan and Ħamrun Spartans started and finished the 2006–07 season with a replica of what they did during the 2004–05 season, with another championship win, and an immediate return to the Premier League.

Fenech was hopeful that he could this time keep Ħamrun Spartans in the Premier League during the 2007–08 season, following a hard season, Ħamrun Spartans defied the odds and finished in sixth position. Ryan's performances were so impressive that he was called up to the Malta national football team, during the season Ryan made 24 appearances and scored two goals.

For the 2008–09 season, Fenech and Ħamrun Spartans hoped to improve on their previous season, but the club did anything but, and following an extremely poor season Ħamrun Spartans were yet again relegated to the First Division. with another 10th-place finish, during the season, Ryan made 22 appearances and scored one goal.

With the player in high demand, linked with Marsaxlokk, Valletta and Sliema Wanderers, and forcing his way into the Maltese national team, Fenech was seeking a short term move away from Ħamrun Spartans, with the player thinking if he stayed with Ħamrun Spartans and played in the First Division it may harm his international chances.

=== Sliema Wanderers ===
During the summer of 2009, Ryan Fenech completed a season long loan deal to move from Ħamrun Spartans to Sliema Wanderers.

Fenech made his Premier League debut for Sliema Wanderers on 30 August 2009 in a 1–0 defeat to Qormi.

Ryan scored his first Premier League goal for Sliema Wanderers on 7 February 2010, as he scored after 11 minutes to help Sliema Wanderers to a 3–0 victory over Floriana.

=== Valletta ===
Fenech joined Valletta for the 2010–11 season of the Premier League. At his first season with Valletta, Fenech won the Premier League, going unbeaten all season. Fenech played a vital part in Valletta's UEFA Champions League qualifiers, where Valletta reached the second round after beating Tre Fiori 5–1 on aggregate. They then faced FK Ekranas, where they lost 2–4 on aggregate.

== Honours ==
=== Club ===
Ħamrun Spartans

- Maltese First Division: 2004–05, 2006–07

Valletta

- Maltese Premier League: 2013–14

=== Individual ===
- Maltese Player of the Year: 2013–14

== Personal life ==
- Ryan is the older brother of Ħamrun Spartans midfielder Roderick Fenech.
- Married with 2 kids.
- Fenech says that his favourite overseas team is Juventus, and that his favourite footballer is Alessandro Del Piero.

== Career statistics ==
Statistics accurate as of match played 1 August 2009.

Appearances and goals by club, season and competition
Club	Season	League			Maltese Cup		League Cup		Europe		Total	
Club	Season	Division	Apps	Goals	Apps	Goals	Apps	Goals	Apps	Goals	Apps	Goals
Ħamrun Spartans	2002–03	Maltese Premier League	6	1	0	0	0	0	0	0	6	1
Ħamrun Spartans	2003–04	Maltese Premier League	10	0	0	0	0	0	0	0	10	0
Ħamrun Spartans	2004–05	Maltese First Division			0	0	0	0	0	0		
Ħamrun Spartans	2005–06	Maltese Premier League	20	2	0	0	0	0	0	0	20	2
Ħamrun Spartans	2006–07	Maltese First Division			0	0	0	0	0	0		
Ħamrun Spartans	2007–08	Maltese Premier League	24	2	0	0	0	0	0	0	24	2
Ħamrun Spartans	2008–09	Maltese Premier League	22	1	0	0	0	0	0	0	22	1
Sliema Wanderers (loan)	2009–10	Maltese Premier League	24	2	0	0	0	0	0	0	24	2
Career total			106	8	0	0	0	0	0	0	106	8
