= 2005–06 Maltese First Division =

Maltese First Division
- Season: 2005–06
- Champions: St. George's
- Promoted: St. George's; Marsa
- Relegated: Lija Athletic; St. Andrews
- Goals scored: 251
- Average goals/game: 2.78
- Top goalscorer: Chima Dozie (15)

The 2005–06 Maltese First Division (known as 2005–06 BOV First Division for sponsorship reasons) started on 10 September 2005 and finished on 14 May 2006. Lija Athletic and St. Patrick were the teams which were relegated from the 2004–05 Maltese Premier League. Tarxien Rainbows and St.Andrews were the promoted teams. St. Georges were the champions and Marsa were the runners-up. Both were promoted to the Premier League. Lija Athletic and St. Andrews were relegated. This was two straight relegations for Lija while St. Andrews were sent back down having just been promoted.

== Teams ==
The Maltese First Division 2005–06 was made up of these teams:

- Lija Athletic
- Marsa
- Mqabba
- Naxxar Lions
- San Ġwann
- Senglea Athletic
- St. Andrew's
- St. George's
- Żabbar St. Patrick
- Tarxien Rainbows

== Changes from previous season ==
- Ħamrun Spartans and Mosta were promoted from the First Division to the Premier League. They were replaced by Lija Athletic and St. Patrick, both relegated from the 2004–05 Maltese Premier League.
- Balzan Youths and Gozo were relegated to the 2005–06 Maltese Second Division. They were replaced by Tarxien Rainbows and St. Andrews.

== League table ==
Pos	Team	Pld	W	D	L	GF	GA	GD	Pts	Promotion or relegation
1	St. George's (C)	18	10	5	3	27	14	+13	35	Promotion to 2006–07 Maltese Premier League
2	Marsa	18	9	6	3	33	20	+13	33	Promotion to 2006–07 Maltese Premier League
3	Mqabba	18	9	4	5	28	18	+10	31	
4	Tarxien Rainbows	18	8	5	5	25	18	+7	29	
5	Senglea Athletic	18	8	3	7	21	23	−2	27	
6	St. Patrick	18	7	5	6	29	22	+7	26	
7	San Ġwann	18	7	2	9	23	25	−2	23	
8	Naxxar Lions	18	6	2	10	32	38	−6	20	
9	Lija Athletic (R)	18	5	3	10	20	33	−13	18	Relegation to 2006–07 Maltese Second Division
10	St. Andrews (R)	18	1	5	12	13	40	−27	8	Relegation to 2006–07 Maltese Second Division

(C) Champions; (R) Relegated

== Results ==
Home \ Away	LJA	MAR	MQA	NAX	SĠW	SEN	STA	STG	STP	TAR
Lija Athletic	—	0–3	1–1	0–4	0–2	2–1	4–2	1–3	2–2	1–2
Marsa	0–0	—	2–0	4–2	2–2	3–0	1–1	1–0	3–1	0–2
Mqabba	3–1	4–0	—	4–1	1–0	1–2	2–0	0–0	0–2	0–2
Naxxar Lions	0–1	0–4	2–5	—	4–0	3–2	3–0	1–1	1–2	1–2
San Ġwann	2–0	1–3	1–1	4–1	—	0–1	3–0	1–2	0–3	2–1
Senglea Athletic	0–2	0–0	2–1	2–3	2–1	—	3–1	0–2	1–0	1–0
St. Andrews	3–2	1–1	0–1	0–4	0–2	0–1	—	0–3	1–1	2–2
St. George's	1–2	2–2	1–1	3–1	1–0	2–2	1–0	—	2–0	1–0
St. Patrick	2–1	2–1	1–2	4–1	0–1	1–1	5–1	0–1	—	2–2
Tarxien Rainbows	2–0	2–3	0–1	0–0	3–1	1–0	1–1	2–1	1–1	—

Legend: Blue = home team win; Yellow = draw; Red = away team win.

== Top scorers ==
As of 14 May 2006

Rank	Player	Club	Goals
1	(Nigeria) Chima Dozie	Naxxar Lions	15
2	(Malta) Mark Tanti	St. Patrick	11
3	(Malta) Gilbert Martin	Marsa	10
4	(Nigeria) Uchenna Anywanna	Mqabba	9
5	(Malta) Karl Sciberras	San Ġwann	8
5	(Nigeria) Anthony Ewurum	St. George's	8
