= 2006–07 Maltese Second Division =

Maltese Second Division
- Season: 2006–07
- Champions: Dingli Swallows
- Promoted: Dingli Swallows; Mellieha
- Relegated: Zebbug Rangers; Gudja United; Gozo FC
- Goals: 358
- Average goals/game: 2.71
- Top goalscorer: Malcolm Tirchett (16)

The Maltese Second Division 2006-07 (known as BOV Second Division 2006-07 due to sponsorship reasons) started on 23 September 2006 and ended on 6 May 2007. Lija Athletic and St. Andrews were the relegated teams. The promoted teams were Birzebbuga St.Peters, Santa Venera Lightning and Rabat Ajax. Dingli Swallows finished the league as champions. Therefore, they were promoted to 2007–08 Maltese First Division. They were joined with Mellieha who finished as runner-up. Gudja United and Gozo FC were relegated to 2007–08 Maltese Third Division. Zebbug Rangers were also relegated as they lost the relegation-playoffs.

== Participating teams ==
- Balzan Youths
- Birzebbuga St.Peters
- Dingli Swallows
- Gozo FC
- Gudja United
- Lija Athletic
- Melita
- Mellieha
- Rabat Ajax
- St.Andrews
- Santa Venera Lightning
- Zebbug Rangers

== Changes from previous season ==
- Qormi and Vittoriosa Stars were promoted to 2006–07 Maltese First Division. They were replaced with Lija Athletic and St.Andrews, both relegated from 2005–06 Maltese First Division.
- Gzira United, Attard and Gharghur were relegated to 2006–07 Maltese Third Division. They were replaced with Birzebbuga St.Peters, Santa Venera Lightning and Rabat Ajax, all promoted from 2005–06 Maltese Third Division.

== Final standings ==
Pos	Team	Pld	W	D	L	GF	GA	GD	Pts	Promotion or relegation
1	Dingli Swallows (C)	22	14	5	3	47	15	+32	47	Champions and promotion to 2007–08 Maltese First Division
2	Mellieha	22	12	6	4	38	25	+13	42	Promotion to 2007–08 Maltese First Division
3	Rabat	22	11	6	5	36	24	+12	39	
4	Birzebbuga St.Peters	22	10	5	7	31	25	+6	35	
5	Balzan Youths	22	10	4	8	38	25	+13	34	
6	Melita	22	10	4	8	38	28	+10	34	
7	Lija Athletic	22	8	6	8	27	25	+2	30	
8	Santa Venera Lightning	22	9	3	10	27	32	−5	30	
9	St.Andrews	22	7	5	10	21	28	−7	26	
10	Zebbug Rangers (R)	22	5	8	9	18	29	−11	23	Relegation playoffs
11	Gudja United (R)	22	4	3	15	17	50	−33	15	Relegation to 2007–08 Maltese Third Division
12	Gozo FC (R)	22	2	5	15	20	52	−32	11	Relegation to 2007–08 Maltese Third Division

(C) Champions; (R) Relegated

== Relegation playoffs ==
Pos	Team	Pld	W	D	L	GF	GA	GD	Pts	Promotion, qualification or relegation	ŻRQ	FGR	ŻBĠ	QRD
1	Żurrieq (P)	3	3	0	0	5	0	+5	9	Promotion to the Second Division	—	2–0		
2	Fgura United	3	2	0	1	4	2	+2	6			—	1–0	3–0
3	Żebbuġ Rangers (R)	3	1	0	2	1	3	−2	3	Relegation to the Third Division	0–2		—	1–0
4	Qrendi	3	0	0	3	0	5	−5	0		0–1			—

Source: RSSSF
(P) Promoted; (R) Relegated

== Top scorers ==
Goals	Player	Team
16	(Malta) Malcolm Tirchett	Balzan
16	(Malta) Chris Ciappara	Dingli
14	(Malta) Matthew Borg I	Melita
14	(Malta) Aldrin Muscat	Birzebbuga
13	(Malta) Adam Smeir	Rabat

== Results ==
Home \ Away	BAL	BIR	DIN	GOZ	GUD	LIJ	MLT	MLL	RAB	STA	STV	ZEB
Balzan		1–2	0–4	6–0	3–0	2–0	1–2	3–1	1–3	0–0	3–0	1–1
Birzebbuga	0–2		2–3	4–3	2–0	0–1	0–2	1–0	2–2	1–2	3–0	1–0
Dingli	3–1	2–1		5–3	5–0	1–0	1–0	0–1	1–1	2–0	2–0	2–0
Gozo	0–4	1–2	1–1		0–4	1–1	0–4	1–2	0–0	0–1	1–2	0–2
Gudja	2–3	0–4	0–0	0–1		1–0	1–4	0–2	0–4	0–4	2–5	1–0
Lija	0–0	0–0	1–0	2–0	3–0		3–2	1–3	0–1	3–1	1–1	1–1
Melita	3–1	0–0	3–2	3–0	2–4	3–1		1–1	3–1	1–1	0–1	2–2
Mellieha	0–2	1–1	0–3	4–1	2–0	3–2	3–2		1–1	0–0	3–1	3–0
Rabat	2–1	1–2	1–1	2–1	4–1	2–3	1–0	1–1		0–1	2–1	2–0
St.Andrews	0–2	2–2	0–4	1–1	1–0	0–2	3–0	1–2	0–2		2–1	0–1
S.Venera	2–1	0–1	0–5	1–1	1–1	1–0	1–0	1–3	3–0	2–0		0–1
Zebbug	0–0	2–0	0–0	1–4	0–0	2–2	0–1	2–2	1–3	2–1	0–3	

Legend: Blue = home team win; Yellow = draw; Red = away team win.

== See also ==
- 2006–07 Maltese Second and Third Division Knock-Out
