= Siggiewi Ground =

Stadium in Siġġiewi, Malta

Siġġiewi Ground
- Interactive map of Siġġiewi Ground
- Full name: Siġġiewi Sports Complex
- Location: Siggiewi, Malta
- Coordinates: 35°51′30″N 14°26′03″E
- Owner: Government of Malta
- Operator: Siggiewi
- Capacity: 240
- Surface: Artificial turf

Construction
- Renovated: 2010

Tenant
- Maltese youth football league

The Siġġiewi Ground (Maltese: Il-Grawnd tas-Siġġiewi) is a stadium located in Siġġiewi, Malta. The stadium seats 240 people and generally hosts matches from the Maltese youth football leagues.

== Background and description ==
As part of the Malta Football Association programme of assisting member clubs and affiliated associations to improve their facilities, which was funded with a HatTrick contribution, the Association's President Mr Darmanin Demajo, inaugurated a synthetic pitch at Siggiewi which will serve the locality's footballers, including the youths and youngsters in the nursery, in their development. The synthetic pitch was inaugurated during the 2010/2011 season. Present for the ceremony were also Mr Pace, then president of Siggiewi F.C., Mr Musumeci, mayor of Siġġiewi, and Clyde Puli, Parliamentary Secretary of Youth and Sport.

The stadium's facilities include a stand situated behind one of the goals and which holds 240 people and dressing rooms. The stadium also makes part of the Siggiewi Sports Complex, which also includes an outdoor basketball court.

== See also ==
- List of football stadiums in Malta
