= 2012–13 Maltese Third Division =

Maltese Third Division
- Season: 2012–13

The 2012–13 Maltese Third Division (also known as 2012–13 BOV 3rd Division due to sponsorship reasons) began on 16 September 2012 and ended on 5 May 2013.

== Participating teams ==
- Attard F.C
- Ghaxaq F.C
- Kalkara F.C.
- Luqa St. Andrew's F.C.
- Marsa F.C.
- Marsaskala F.C.
- Mdina Knights F.C.
- Mtarfa F.C.
- Qrendi F.C.
- Senglea Athletic F.C.
- Sirens F.C.
- St. Lucia F.C.
- Swieqi United
- Ta' Xbiex F.C.
- Xghajra Tornadoes F.C.

== Changes from previous season ==
- Pembroke Athleta F.C., Fgura United F.C. and Mgarr United F.C were promoted to the 2012–13 Maltese Second Division. They were replaced with Attard F.C., Senglea Athletic F.C. and Luqa St. Andrew's F.C., relegated from 2011–12 Maltese Second Division .
- Ta' Xbiex F.C. returned to Maltese football after an absence of 5 years.

== Final league table ==
Pos	Team	Pld	W	D	L	GF	GA	GD	Pts	Promotion
1	Senglea Athletic F.C. (C)	27	21	5	1	87	21	+66	68	Champions and promotion to 2013–14 Maltese Second Division
2	Mdina Knights F.C. (P)	27	21	0	6	55	24	+31	63	Promotion to 2013–14 Maltese Second Division
3	Marsaskala F.C. (P)	27	18	6	3	63	16	+47	60	Promotion to 2013–14 Maltese Second Division
4	Marsa F.C. (P)	27	19	2	6	65	25	+40	59	Promotion to 2013–14 Maltese Second Division
5	Xghajra Tornadoes F.C.	27	15	6	6	54	20	+34	51	
6	Sirens F.C.	27	14	2	11	42	33	+9	44	
7	Mtarfa F.C.	27	10	6	11	35	47	−12	36	
8	Attard F.C.	27	9	6	12	35	48	−13	33	
9	St. Lucia F.C.	27	8	6	13	40	54	−14	30	
10	Kalkara F.C.	27	8	5	14	29	43	−14	29	
11	Swieqi United F.C.	27	8	4	15	18	46	−28	28	
12	Ghaxaq F.C	27	6	8	13	24	44	−20	26	
13	Qrendi F.C.	27	4	5	18	29	75	−46	17	
14	Luqa St. Andrew's F.C.	27	3	6	18	24	65	−41	15	
15	Ta' Xbiex F.C.	27	4	1	22	20	67	−47	13	

(C) Champions; (P) Promoted
