= 2006–07 Maltese First Division =

Maltese First Division
- Season: 2006–07
- Champions: Ħamrun Spartans
- Promoted: Ħamrun Spartans; Mqabba
- Relegated: San Gwann; Naxxar Lions
- Goals scored: 290
- Average goals/game: 3.22
- Top goalscorer: Kenneth Abela (17)

The 2006–07 Maltese First Division (known as 2006–07 BOV First Division due to sponsorship reasons) started on September 3 and finished on May 13. Mosta and Ħamrun Spartans were the teams which were relegated from the 2005–06 Maltese Premier League. Qormi and Vittoriosa Stars were the promoted teams from 2005–06 Maltese Second Division. Ħamrun Spartans finished as champions and returned to the Premier League, having just been relegated. Mqabba were also promoted as runners-up. San Ġwann and Naxxar Lions were relegated to the Second Division.

== Teams ==
The Maltese First Division 2006–07 was made up of these teams:

- Ħamrun Spartans
- Mosta
- Mqabba
- Naxxar Lions
- Qormi
- San Ġwann
- Senglea Athletic
- St. Patrick
- Tarxien Rainbows
- Vittoriosa Stars

== Changes from previous season ==
- St. George's and Marsa were promoted from First Division to the Premier League. They were replaced with Mosta and Ħamrun Spartans, both relegated from 2005–06 Maltese Premier League.
- Lija Athletic and St. Andrews were relegated to the 2006–07 Maltese Second Division. They were replaced with Qormi and Vittoriosa Stars.

== League table ==
Pos	Team	Pld	W	D	L	GF	GA	GD	Pts	Promotion or relegation
1	Ħamrun Spartans (C)	18	12	3	3	34	11	+23	39	Promotion to 2007–08 Maltese Premier League
2	Mqabba	18	10	4	4	33	25	+8	34	Promotion to 2007–08 Maltese Premier League
3	Tarxien Rainbows	18	7	7	4	30	25	+5	28	
4	St. Patrick	18	8	3	7	31	23	+8	27	
5	Senglea Athletic	18	6	9	3	37	22	+15	27	
6	Qormi	18	6	7	5	32	26	+6	25	
7	Vittoriosa Stars	18	5	7	6	27	27	0	22	
8	Mosta	18	6	4	8	26	32	−6	22	
9	San Ġwann (R)	18	2	5	11	20	39	−19	11	Relegation to 2007–08 Maltese Second Division
10	Naxxar Lions (R)	18	2	3	13	20	50	−30	9	Relegation to 2007–08 Maltese Second Division

(C) Champions; (R) Relegated

== Results ==
Home \ Away	ĦAM	MOS	MQA	NAX	QOR	SĠW	SEN	STP	TAR	VIT
Ħamrun Spartans	—	2–0	3–0	6–0	1–1	2–1	0–0	1–2	3–1	1–1
Mosta	0–1	—	3–0	0–4	0–4	2–1	2–2	2–0	3–2	1–2
Mqabba	1–2	3–2	—	4–2	3–2	1–0	1–3	2–1	2–2	2–2
Naxxar Lions	1–0	0–3	0–3	—	0–3	2–4	2–3	0–4	3–3	1–2
Qormi	1–4	3–3	1–1	3–0	—	4–4	1–1	0–1	2–1	1–1
San Ġwann	0–3	0–2	0–3	1–1	2–1	—	0–2	2–4	1–1	0–3
Senglea Athletic	1–2	1–1	0–2	2–1	4–2	1–1	—	0–0	1–1	0–0
St. Patrick	0–2	1–1	1–2	4–0	0–2	3–0	2–4	—	0–1	2–0
Tarxien Rainbows	1–0	3–0	0–0	3–1	0–0	2–1	2–0	3–3	—	3–1
Vittoriosa Stars	0–1	3–1	1–3	2–2	0–1	2–2	2–2	1–3	4–1	—

Legend: Blue = home team win; Yellow = draw; Red = away team win.

== Top scorers ==
As of 13 May 2007

Rank	Player	Club	Goals
1	(Malta) Kenneth Abela	St. Patrick	17
2	(Nigeria) Chima Dozie	Senglea Athletic	15
3	(Malta) Johann Zammit	Qormi	11
3	(Malta) John Paul Muscat	Mqabba	11
5	(Malta) Stefan Sultana	Ħamrun Spartans	10
