= David Johnson (footballer, born 1951) =

English footballer (1951–2022)

Personal information
- Full name: David Edward Johnson
- Date of birth: 23 October 1951
- Place of birth: Liverpool, England
- Date of death: 23 November 2022 (aged 71)
- Position: Forward

Youth career
- 1967–1969: Everton

Senior career*
Years	Team	Apps	(Gls)
1969–1972	Everton	49	(11)
1972–1976	Ipswich Town	136	(35)
1976–1982	Liverpool	148	(55)
1982–1984	Everton	40	(4)
1984	→ Barnsley (loan)	4	(1)
1984	Manchester City	6	(1)
1984	Tulsa Roughnecks	17	(4)
1984–1985	Preston North End	24	(3)
1985–1986	Barrow		
- Naxxar Lions
Total		424	(114)

International career
1973–1976	England U23	9	(3)
1975–1980	England	8	(5)

Managerial career
- 1985–1986: Barrow (player-manager)
- * Club domestic league appearances and goals

David Edward Johnson (23 October 1951 – 23 November 2022) was an English professional footballer and manager. He played as a "battling, play-linking forward". In six seasons with Liverpool, from 1976 to 1982, his wins included four Football League First Division titles, three European Cup titles, one UEFA Super Cup title and two Football League Cup titles. He was selected for the 1979–80 First Division PFA Team of the Year, when he scored 27 of 55 goals shared with strike partner, Kenny Dalglish. Johnson is one of only two players to score playing for both Everton and Liverpool in the Merseyside derby.

With Ipswich Town, he won the 1972–73 Texaco Cup and never finished lower than sixth in the top division in his four Ipswich seasons. He was inducted into the club's Hall of Fame in 2016. Johnson later had spells with Barnsley, Manchester City, Tulsa Roughnecks, Preston North End, Barrow (as player manager) and Naxxar Lions. He has a disputed tally of at least five goals in his eight England national team games, for whom he never played in a losing team. He played for England at UEFA Euro 1980.

== Club career ==
=== Everton ===
Johnson grew up in Halewood as a boyhood Kopite. He later said:

After winning the English schools trophy with the Liverpool schoolboys side, I was lucky to have scouts from both Liverpool and Everton trying to sign me. At the time the Everton scout sold Goodison better than the Liverpool scout did Anfield so I signed for them. I had watched Liverpool throughout the sixties and they fielded virtually the same side week in week out, whereas the Everton scout pointed out Everton had a good youth policy and did give the younger players a chance. So with Everton going through a transitional period, I felt I would have a better chance by going to Goodison.

In May 1967 aged 15, he signed as an apprentice for Harry Catterick's Everton. He scored the first of four separate competition debut goals for Everton when scoring for the reserves in the Central League.

Aged 19, Johnson scored debuting for Everton's first team, on 8 January 1971 in a 2–2 league draw at Burnley. The following month he scored on his FA Cup debut, winning 1–0 hosting Brian Clough's Derby County in the fifth round. He scored on his UEFA competition debut in the European Cup quarter-final 1–1 draw hosting Panathinaikos. Johnson subbed on for a right foot equaliser with the last kick of the game. He subbed on late in the Athens 0–0 second leg, but Everton went out on away goals. Four days later, Johnson was left out the FA Cup semi-final squad that lost 2–1 to a Liverpool comeback, to end a week later reported as marking the end of the great Everton side from the previous decade.

In November 1971 before 56,563 fans, Johnson scored on his Merseyside derby debut at Goodison Park's Gwladys Street end in Everton's 1–0 league win. He volleyed in a rebound after Ray Clemence had pushed his header on to the post. Johnson's 11 goal tally in all competitions for a now declining team in his first full season attracted a £100,000 offer from Crystal Palace. Catterick twice rejected Bill Shankly offers for Johnson to transfer direct to Everton's city rivals, Liverpool. Catterick instead transferred Johnson to Ipswich Town.

=== Ipswich Town ===
==== 1972–73 season ====
Aged 21, Johnson joined Bobby Robson's Ipswich Town in autumn 1972 in exchange for Ipswich's top scorer, Rod Belfitt, plus £40,000 going to Goodison. The transfer date is disputed, reported in some sources as 30 October and in some sources as early November. Robson heavily utilised the Ipswich youth system, making Johnson one of just 14 players Robson signed in his 13 years managing Ipswich. Johnson forged a powerful strike partnership with Trevor Whymark, supported by the industrious Bryan Hamilton and the clever Colin Viljoen both weighing in with goals from midfield. Johnson's move to Ipswich was later described as "a perfect fit at Portman Road where Bobby Robson was laying the foundations of the thirteen-year reign in charge which would ultimately land him the England manager's job."

Known at Ipswich as "Jonty", he debuted for them on 4 November 1972 in a 2–2 league draw hosting Don Revie's Leeds United. Johnson assisted Whymark putting Ipswich 2–1 ahead in what was reported as Johnson having "a fine debut". Johnson's first Ipswich goal was on 2 December the same year, drawing 1–1 in the league at Manchester City with a first time left foot equaliser from inside the box. That was the first of four Johnson goals in three games (all in the league), including a double against Crystal Palace in a 2–1 home win. On 17 February, Johnson's headers from set-pieces led to two Hamilton goals, winning 4–1 in the league against Manchester United before the then-record 31,857 Portman Road crowd. Johnson played on 10 March when that Portman Road record was surpassed when 34,632 saw Arsenal win in the league 2–1. Another of his goals that season was when losing 2–1 in the league at Liverpool on 24 February.

He played in every league game that season after signing with Ipswich. They lost only six of their final 27 league games as they finished fourth, qualifying for the UEFA Cup. Ipswich won the 1972–73 Texaco Cup final 4–2 on aggregate (both 2–1 victories), over East Anglian derby rivals Norwich City. Johnson did not play in the away second leg. Johnson ended his opening Ipswich season with eight goals from his 33 games, and a call-up to the England U23s.

==== 1973–74 season ====
In the UEFA Cup first round, Ipswich won 1–0 at home and drew 0–0 in front of 80,000 fans away, eliminating Real Madrid. In the second round, visitors Lazio were 4–0 down in the first leg. Giancarlo Oddi's waist high challenge caused Johnson's stretchering off, needing scrotal stitches. Johnson consequently missed Ipswich's next three games. Johnson returned to the bench for the second leg in Rome. Pre-kickoff, Trevor Whymark was handed a commemorative trophy by a group of Roma fans for his four first leg goals against their arch-rivals. That Roma provocation sparked Lazio ultras and players to an evening of violence. Johnson subbed on in the 83rd minute. Giorgio Chinaglia soon after scored his third of the game to put the tie back in the balance, 4–1 on the night (5–4 on aggregate to Ipswich). Johnson's low left foot finish from just outside the box then settled the tie 6–4. "Believe me, it was not football, it was war." Robson said afterwards.

Ipswich beat Frans Thijssen and FC Twente home (1–0) and away (2–1) in the third round. Ipswich then lost the quarter-final to Locomotiv Leipzig 4–3 on penalties. Both legs were 1–0 home wins. Mick Mills was sent off in the 40th minute of the away second leg with the score at 0–0. 57,000 fans attended. Johnson was the second of three Ipswich penalty takers in the shootout in East Germany who failed to convert. He scored 15 times in 54 games that season. His goals included league doubles at West Ham United) in a 3–3 draw and Chelsea in a 3–2 win. He also scored again at Liverpool, this time losing 4–2 on 17 November. He scored the equaliser in the 2–1 derby win at Norwich City on 26 December. Ipswich again finished fourth in the league, qualifying for the UEFA Cup.

==== 1974–75 season ====
In the UEFA Cup first round, Frans Thijssen and FC Twente eliminated Ipswich on away goals (2–2 in Ipswich, then 1–1 in Enschede). Ipswich domestically chased the league and FA Cup double. On 2 November, hosting top of the table Liverpool, Johnson evaded Emlyn Hughes and Chris Lawler to assist Brian Talbot, winning the match 1–0. Ipswich topped the table after a 2–0 home win over Middlesbrough on 11 January, with Johnson's right foot shot from the just outside the box the second goal. All Ipswich FA Cup opponents were fellow First Division clubs. Johnson scored in the third round round 2–1 win at Wolverhampton Wanderers. He played in the fourth round, eliminating holders, Liverpool, 1–0 at home. 34,709 watched to surpass the crowd of Arsenal's 1973 visit. His goal at 0–2 down in the fifth round hosting Aston Villa, sparked a comeback 3–2 win. He also played the key pass to Talbot leading to Bryan Hamilton's equaliser.

They needed three "stamina sapping" March FA Cup quarter-final replays to eliminate Leeds United. Johnson started all four games, including the 0–0 first of the four, setting a 38,010 Portman Road crowd record that still stands. Johnson headed Ipswich ahead in the away 1–1 first replay. The third game was another 0–0, this time at neutral Filbert Street. Johnson was subbed off injured in the 37th minute of the fourth game, a 3–2 win played at Filbert Street again. He consequently missed Ipswich's next five games. Johnson thus missed the April semi-final 0–0 draw with West Ham United, and the 2–1 replay loss.

He also missed the 31 March, 0–0 league game at soon-to-be relegated Chelsea. Results elsewhere that day meant Ipswich missed the chance to top the league for the first time since mid-January. That league season Ipswich, "made the early running, but fixture congestion and a relatively thin squad got the better of them." Title contenders Ipswich (2–1 at Leeds), Liverpool and Everton all lost on the league season's penultimate Saturday on 19 April. Ipswich drawing their game in hand 1–1 four days later at Manchester City won the title that day for Dave Mackay's Derby County. Ipswich finished third in that league season, two points behind, but consoled by their third consecutive UEFA Cup qualification. Johnson again scored 15 goals in a season, this time in 48 games. That included a hat-trick, beating Coventry City 4–0 at home on 16 November. He scored another derby goal against Norwich City, losing 2–1 in the League Cup fifth round home replay on 10 December 1974.

==== 1975–76 season ====
His four goals in five games near the beginning of the season included the opener in the 2–0 league win hosting Liverpool on 13 September. Four days later, Johnson scored the winner in a 2–1 victory over Feyenoord in the first leg first round of the UEFA Cup. That was followed up by a 2–0 second leg home win. Against Club Brugge in the second round, Ipswich won 3–0 at home but went out losing 4–0 in the away tie. Johnson and Ipswich ended the league season in sixth, the lowest of his four Ipswich seasons. He scored eight goals in 43 games. One of his goals included heading home Eric Gates' cross to pull back to 3–2 in the 3–3 league draw at Everton.

Johnson scored 46 goals in 178 Ipswich appearances. In Johnson's four Ipswich seasons, they finished in the top division fourth (twice), third and sixth respectively. In 1976, Tottenham Hotspur unsuccessfully bid around £200,000 for him. Johnson later said though, "I had four great years under Bobby Robson and there was only one club that would have prised me away from Portman Road and that was Liverpool."

Johnson was later inducted into the Ipswich Town Hall of Fame in 2016.

=== Liverpool ===
Aged 24, Johnson joined Bob Paisley's Liverpool on 12 August 1976, viewed as a long term John Toshack replacement. The fee was a then club record £200,000. In Johnson's first Liverpool season he was a frequent substitute, vying with the established Toshack and the young David Fairclough to partner Kevin Keegan. On 21 August, the opening day of the season, Johnson made his debut for Liverpool in a 1–0 home win over Norwich. He scored his first Liverpool goal a week later on 28 August, losing 2–1 at Birmingham City.

Liverpool chased an unprecedented treble of League championship, FA Cup and European Cup as that season ended. Johnson picked up his first major domestic honour with the 1976–77 Football League First Division title. He partnered Keegan in the 1977 FA Cup final, in a 2–1 loss to Manchester United at Wembley Stadium. Johnson made little impact before being substituted in the second half by Ian Callaghan. For the 1977 European Cup final four days later, Paisley started the team that had ended the FA Cup final, resulting in a 3–1 win over Borussia Mönchengladbach, Johnson was unused from the bench. He subbed on in both legs of the 1977 European Super Cup against Keegan's new club, Hamburger SV. Liverpool drew 0–0 away and won 6–0 at home.

Johnson was again largely a squad player for most of his second Liverpool season, due to a combination of injuries and the immediate success of Kenny Dalglish who had replaced Keegan. In April though, Johnson headed a European Cup semi-final first leg equaliser in losing 2–1 at Mönchengladbach. Liverpool progressed 4–2 on aggregate.

In April 1978, he became the first player to score for both clubs in the Merseyside derby, this time in his derby debut for Liverpool. As of February 2025, only Peter Beardsley has also scored playing for both teams in a Merseyside derby. Johnson like his Everton derby goal, scored his Liverpool derby goal in front of Goodison's Gwladys Street end for a 1–0 winner. Unlike Beardsley, both Johnson's goals for opposing Merseyside derby teams were both winners. Three days later against Leicester City, in only his seventh league start that season, Johnson injured his knee ligaments. He consequently missed the 1978 European Cup final, a 1–0 win over Club Brugge at Wembley.

In the 1978–79 and 1979–80 seasons, Johnson was a free-scoring centre forward partner to Dalglish (the best player Johnson said he played with or against). Liverpool regained (from Nottingham Forest) and then retained the league title. Johnson in 1980 was named (as was Dalglish), in the First Division PFA Team of the Year. Johnson scored his career highest 27 goals that season. "Linking telepathically", he and Dalglish scored 55 goals that season between them.

Johnson missed the first game and replay of the 1981 Football League Cup final win over West Ham United. Johnson assisted the decisive second leg away goal for Ray Kennedy drawing 1–1 at Bayern Munich in the European Cup semi-final. In the 1981 European Cup final in Paris, Johnson played the full game defeating Real Madrid 1–0, regaining another trophy from Forest.

In the 1981–82 season, Ian Rush was Dalglish's regular partner with Johnson demoted to deputy. In the 1982 Football League Cup final, Johnson was subbed on for Terry McDermott in a 3–1 win over Tottenham Hotspur. Johnson still played enough games that season to earn himself a fourth league championship medal.

In his six Liverpool seasons, he scored 78 goals in 213 games in all competitions.

=== Return to Everton ===
Aged 30, Johnson returned to Everton in August 1982 for £100,000, signed by ex-Everton early 70s team mate, Howard Kendall. He scored five goals in his second Everton spell.

==== Loan to Barnsley ====
He did not see out his second season back at Goodison after initially, being loaned on 2 February 1984 for a month to Norman Hunter's Barnsley. Johnson is listed on his obituary on the Barnsley website as, "famously scoring the winner against Leeds United at Elland Road." Barnsley won that Second Division game 2–1 on 25 February.

=== Later career ===
Aged 32, Johnson ended the 1983–84 season at Billy McNeill's Manchester City. Johnson then spent that summer under Wim Suurbier at Tulsa Roughnecks in the NASL.

On 10 October 1984 (13 days before his 33rd birthday), he signed for Alan Kelly at Preston North End, staying for the rest of that season. In August 1985, he joined non-league Barrow, player-managing them from October for six months.

In August 1986 aged 34, he joined Naxxar Lions, under the revolution since 1984 of club president, Michael Zammit Tabona. Naxxar earned three promotions in three years between 1986 and 1989, entering the Premier Division for the first time in the club's history. Johnson trained at Liverpool's Melwood training ground, flying to Malta once a fortnight to play.

== International career ==
Aged 23, Johnson was at Ipswich when England manager, Don Revie, called him up for his first full England cap. Johnson debuted in a British Home Championship match at Wembley Stadium on 21 May 1975. He scored both England goals in a 2–2 draw with Wales.

In February 1980, Ron Greenwood recalled Johnson to play for England's senior team for the first time since 1975. Johnson scored twice in a 3–1 victory over then-world champions Argentina at Wembley on 13 May 1980, marking Diego Maradona's first game in England. 28 year old Johnson's last game playing for England was their opening game, a 1–1 draw against Belgium at UEFA Euro 1980. England went out at the group stage.

Johnson scored at least five goals in his eight senior England appearances. His international goals tally is disputed. A Johnson effort in the 1980 home 1–1 draw with Northern Ireland is reported by some as a Noel Brotherston own goal. Johnson was unbeaten in all eight of his senior England games.

== Personality and style of play ==
Johnson scored with both feet and his head.

Roy Evans described him as such, "Led the line well up front. Scored his fair share of goals as well. A great personality, a big buoyant personality. It was always a great asset in the dressing room. Dave, kept everybody on their toes."

Kenny Dalglish expressed on Johnson's death, "David was hugely popular in the dressing room. A really good guy." Everton chairman Bill Kenwright remarked, "That David enjoyed the love and respect of both sides of Stanley Park underlined his qualities both as a footballer and a man. He was one of the few who crossed the divide and managed to retain his reputation with both sets of supporters. That is because he was always honest, hard-working and brave."

Johnson's Ipswich Town obituary commented on his, "ability to link the play up front, his inexhaustible work-rate and his eye for goal", "pace and willingness to go in where the boots were flying" and "ability in front of goal and his selfless running that benefited his teammates". The East Anglian Daily Times describe him as a "battling, play-linking forward".

Johnson reflected on his Liverpool career, "I was never a great player but I did play in a great side with some very good players. We had the workhorses, the good players and the great players and it was down to the great management of Bob Paisley that we had such a superb balance."

== After playing ==
Johnson remained in Merseyside, working in the life insurance division of Royal Insurance. He joined the after dinner speaking circuit and set up football camps with his great friend, Alan Kennedy.

Johnson remained involved with professional football working with BBC Radio Merseyside as a match summariser. He was also in their Red Alert programme broadcast on Fridays at 7:30 pm. He provided what was known during the show as "The Doc's Diagnosis". He also worked at Anfield as a match day lounge host.

Johnson died from throat cancer aged 71, on 23 November 2022 in Halewood. His funeral was on 13 December 2022 at St. Peter's Church in Woolton. His funeral cortege stopped at the stadiums of both Everton and Liverpool. Ex-Liverpool players John Aldridge, Howard Gayle, Sammy Lee and Phil Thompson helped carry the coffin into the church. Former teammates Kenny Dalglish and Kevin Ratcliffe were among many other ex-players in attendance.

On 6 February 2025, a mural of Johnson holding a European Cup was unveiled at Gurnell Street in Anfield.

== Honours ==
Ipswich Town

- Texaco Cup: 1973

Liverpool

- Football League First Division: 1976–77, 1978–79, 1979–80, 1981–82
- Football League Cup: 1981–82
- FA Charity Shield: 1976, 1977 (shared), 1979, 1980
- European Cup: 1976–77, 1977–78, 1980–81
- European Super Cup: 1977
- FA Cup runner-up: 1976–77

Individual

- PFA Team of the Year: 1979–80 First Division
- Ipswich Town Hall of Fame: Inducted 2016
