= 2007–08 Maltese Second Division =

Maltese Second Division
- Season: 2007–08
- Champions: San Gwann
- Promoted: San Gwann; Rabat Ajax
- Relegated: Zurrieq; Sirens
- Goals: 353
- Average goals/game: 2.67
- Top goalscorer: Kurt Coleiro (17)

The Maltese Second Division 2007–08 (known as BOV Second Division 2007–08 due to sponsorship reasons) started on 21 September 2007 and ended on 18 May 2008. San Gwann and Naxxar Lions were relegated from 2006–07 Maltese First Division.The promoted teams from 2006–07 Maltese Third Division were Mgarr United, Sirens and Zurrieq.The league was won by San Gwann.They finished on 47 points, level with Balzan Youths and Rabat Ajax.They were declared champions for their superior goal difference. Balzan Youths and Rabat Ajax had to play a promotion play-off for the team to get promoted. The play-off was won 3-0 by Rabat Ajax. At the other end Sirens and Zurrieq were relegated while Mgarr United had to play the relegation playoffs with four teams from the Third Division. Zurrieq were relegated because they had a 5-point deduction by the Malta Football Association. They had three points deducted after failing to present the signed balance sheet. Zurrieq had another two points deducted after being found guilty of casing the incidents which led the BOV Second Division match against Luxol on April 27 to be abandoned. Referee Chris Francalanza abandoned the match on 69 minutes after he was hit by a Zurrieq player. If they were deducted no points it would have been Mgarr United relegated. Mgarr managed to win the relegation playoffs and secure their second division status for the first time.

== Participating teams ==
- Balzan Youths
- Birzebbuga St.Peters
- Lija Athletic
- Melita
- Mgarr United
- Naxxar Lions
- Rabat Ajax
- San Gwann
- Sirens
- St.Andrews
- Santa Venera Lightning
- Zurrieq

== Changes from previous season ==
- Dingli Swallows and Mellieha were promoted to the First Division. They were replaced with San Gwann and Naxxar Lions, both relegated from 2006–07 Maltese First Division.
- Gozo FC, Gudja United and Zebbug Rangers were relegated to the Third Division. They were replaced with Mgarr United, Sirens and Zurrieq, all promoted from 2006–07 Maltese Third Division.

== Final standings ==
Pos	Team	Pld	W	D	L	GF	GA	GD	Pts	Promotion or relegation
1	San Gwann (C)	22	14	5	3	45	22	+23	47	Champions and promotion to 2008–09 Maltese First Division
2	Balzan Youths	22	15	2	5	55	25	+30	47	Promotion playoff
3	Rabat Ajax	22	14	5	3	36	11	+25	47	Promotion playoff
4	Melita	22	13	3	6	43	23	+20	42	
5	Birzebbuga St.Peters	22	11	2	9	36	36	0	35	
6	Lija Athletic	22	8	4	10	25	29	−4	28	
7	Santa Venera Lightning	22	8	4	10	28	39	−11	28	
8	St. Andrews	22	7	5	10	20	26	−6	26	
9	Naxxar Lions	22	7	2	13	17	31	−14	23	
10	Mgarr United (O)	22	5	6	11	23	37	−14	21	Relegation-promotion playoffs
11	Zurrieq (R)	22	5	7	10	26	31	−5	17 (Note: Zurrieq were docked 5 points. They had three points deducted after failing to present the signed balance sheet. Zurrieq had another two points deducted after being found guilty of casing the incidents which led the BOV Second Division match against Luxol on April 27th to be abandoned. Referee Chris Francalanza abandoned the match on 69 minutes after he was hit by a Zurrieq player.)	Relegation to 2008–09 Maltese Third Division
12	Sirens (R)	22	1	3	18	11	55	−44	6	Relegation to 2008–09 Maltese Third Division

(C) Champions; (O) Play-off winners; (R) Relegated

== Promotion play-off ==
Team 1	Score	Team 2
Rabat Ajax	3–0	Balzan Youths

== Relegation-promotion play-off ==
Participating

Club	Position
Attard	2nd in 3rd Division Section A
Gharghur	3rd in 3rd Division Section B
Gzira United	2nd in 3rd Division Section B
Mgarr United	10th in Maltese Second Division 2007–08
Xghajra Tornadoes	3rd in 3rd Division Section A

Quarter final

Team 1	Score	Team 2
Xghajra Tornadoes	1–0	Gharghur

- Gharghur remain in Maltese Third Division

Semi-finals

Team 1	Score	Team 2
Mgarr	1–0 (a.e.t.)	Xghajra Tornadoes
Attard	4–3 (a.e.t.) (3–4 p)	Gzira United

- Xghajra and Gzira remain in Maltese Third Division

Final

Team 1	Score	Team 2
Mgarr United	1–0	Attard

- Mgarr remain in Maltese Second Division
- Attard remain in Maltese Third Division

== Top scorers ==
Goals	Player	Team
17	(Malta) Kurt Coleiro	Balzan
12	(Malta) Ronnie Celeste	Birzebbuga
12	(Malta) Johann Zammit	Birzebbuga
11	(Malta) Godfrey Chetcuti	Zurrieq
10	(Malta) Matthew Borg II	Melita
10	(Malta) Chris Abela	Mgarr
10	(Malta) Adam Smeir	Rabat

== Results ==
Home \ Away	BAL	BIR	LIJ	MEL	MGA	NAX	RAB	SGW	SIR	STA	STV	ZUR
Balzan		2–1	4–2	3–2	4–1	7–0	0–0	1–3	4–0	0–1	5–0	0–3
Birzebbuga	0–4		4–2	2–3	2–0	3–1	0–2	2–2	2–1	4–1	0–1	4–2
Lija	0–2	0–1		3–2	1–2	0–0	0–1	0–1	4–0	1–0	0–2	3–1
Melita	3–1	1–2	2–0		5–0	1–0	0–0	2–1	5–0	1–0	4–1	0–1
Mgarr	1–2	3–1	1–2	0–0		0–1	0–4	2–2	3–0	0–0	1–2	1–0
Naxxar	2–2	1–0	0–1	0–1	2–1		0–2	1–3	1–0	1–3	0–1	1–0
Rabat	0–1	5–1	1–1	2–1	3–1	2–0		0–1	3–0	1–2	2–0	2–0
S.Gwann	1–0	3–4	4–0	2–0	1–0	2–0	1–1		1–1	4–1	1–1	2–1
Sirens	1–5	0–1	0–2	1–3	0–0	0–5	0–1	1–4		1–2	2–1	0–1
St.Andrews	1–0	1–2	0–0	0–1	0–0	0–1	0–1	1–0	1–1		1–2	3–1 (Note: Match abandoned after 69 minutes.)
S.Venera	1–3	0–1	1–3	2–4	3–4	1–0	1–1	2–4	2–1	3–1		1–1
Zurrieq	2–3	1–1	0–0	2–2	2–2	1–0	1–2	1–2	4–1	1–1	0–0	

Legend: Blue = home team win; Yellow = draw; Red = away team win.
