= Michael Zammit Tabona =

Maltese entrepreneur

Michael Zammit Tabona (May 1950) is a former Maltese non-resident ambassador to Finland from 2014 to 2020, a hotelier, former president of the Naxxar Lions F.C. (1984–2000) and deputy mayor of Naxxar (1992–2000).

== Early life ==
Described by Armstrong and Mitchell as "a wealthy individual from a patrician background with a love of football", "fast-talking, ebullient and indiscreet", "diminutive yet confident", Michael Zammit Tabona is the son of an entrepreneur who established Malta's second hotel in British colonial times, with a distant family connection to Lord Mountbatten. Michael attended St. Edward's College, where he was a difficult boarding pupil, then studied languages and hotel management in Switzerland. In 1973, at 21, he was back in Malta, managing a hotel from the family properties. He also started purchasing second-hand vessels and renting them for advertising to the Captain Morgan rum company; he later retained the brand for a new cruising company, today among the leading ones in Malta. Zammit Tabona led the development of package holidays for British tourists to Malta in the 1970s and 1980s, catering to up to 30,000 holidaymakers annually. In the 1990s he opened a sea-front hotel in Sliema, offering spa treatment and sport therapies. He also held shared of Manchester United and had good connections in the board of directors of the British football club.

== Presidency of Naxxar F.C. ==
In 1984 Zammit Tabona bought a palace in Naxxar; he went on to become President of the local Naxxar Lions football club, bringing it from third division to the Maltese premiere league, thanks to an influx of former British players, including Paul Mariner, David Johnson, Paul O'Berg, as well as coach Simon Lane. Naxxar F.C. also became a cradle for Maltese-Nigerian football players. In 1987 he invited Manchester United F.C. to play a friendly match with Naxxar F.C., which became a local feat, right the day before the 1987 Maltese general election; the sources of financing for the 3-days event have remained disputed since.

Zammit Tabona's Naxxar F.C. got embroiled in a dispute with the Malta Football Association around match-fixture, with Zammit Tabona claiming to denounce such fixture to the media. Naxxar F.C. was relegated two divisions and Zammit Tabona was suspended from the club presidency (which was offered to his wife), until he was reinstated two years later. Naxxar F.C. earned its budget of 35,000 Maltese lira per year from the income of the club bar in the village square, as well as control of parking lots at the annual trade fair, and supporters' club barbeques. Zammit Tabona is reported to have personally invested in the club 40 to 50,000 Lm per season, including for the wages and accommodation of foreign players. After having got at best second behind Valletta F.C., Zammit Tabona resigned in April 2000.

His football exploits landed Zammit Tabona a post as deputy mayor of Naxxar, as an independent, for eight year, from 1992 to 2000, during which he bult a park and a five-a-side football pitch. He then left the post in the local council to his 18-year-old daughter.

He is considered close to the Malta Labour Party since the time of the premiership of Alfred Sant.

== Business entreprises in the 2010s ==
In the 2010s, Zammit Tabona owned via his Fortel group the Fortina Hotel, The Terrace restaurant, the Captain Morgan Cruises, the sightseeing city buses, Malta’s biggest hotel cleaning service and a company that imports wines and spirits. His name is connected to 42 legal entities in Malta.

Fortel is considered to have strong connections to the ruling Labour Party - prime minister Joseph Muscat's also held birthday parties at Zammit Tabona's The Village Kitchen restaurant. Lands Authority CEO James Piscopo also held shares in businesses with the Zammit Tabona family.

A donor to the Labour Party, after the 2013 elections Zammit Taboona was rewarded with a diplomatic post as non-resident ambassador to Finland. He kept posting racist and xenophobic memes, as well as links to fear-mongering articles, on his Facebook profile. He resigned on 10 May 2020 after a public post comparing Angela Merkel to Adolf Hitler.

The Fortina Hotel also had its lease on a big tract of land on the Tigné Seafront controversially changed from solely tourism to a mixed-use development, with the approval of the government, and further plans to extend some 180 square meters into Malta’s waters for their shoreside Fortina Lido.

Zammit Tabona’s cooperative was also awarded by Transport Malta the exclusive rights to the jetties in Ċirkewwa, Blue Lagoon, and Santa Marija Bay. His company also won the tender for the proposed Gozo fast ferry, which was later shot down by the Public Contracts Review Board because of irregularities.

In late 2019, Zammit Tabona also unsuccessfully bid for the presidency of St Julian's water polo club, which stands next to the location where his Fortel group would like to build a jetty for hop-on-hop-off cruises.

In May 2020, Zammit Tabona's Captain Morgan boats were chartered by the Maltese government to lodge migrants on board outside Malta’s territorial waters for a cost of some €10,000 a day. The Maltese government insisted such costs be covered by the European Union.

Zammit Tabona resigned in May 2020 after comparing German chancellor Angela Merkel to Adolf Hitler.
