= Malta Youth Football Association =

Sports governing body in Malta

The Malta Youth Football Association (commonly referred to as the 'Youth FA') oversees youth football in the country of Malta. It started with the founding of the Educational Sports Centre in Marsa in 1972. That was the first nursery in Malta. Hundreds of children attended once or twice a week to train in football, basketball, athletics, and gymnastics. Slowly, the early eighties gave birth to the football nursery practically in every town in Malta. The Youth F.A. was officially established in 1982, comprising the first eight nurseries and clubs, progressing rapidly to the present day. Each nursery caters to children from 6 years to 17-year-old youths In the categories of Under 7, Under 9, Under 11, Under 13, Under 15 and Under 17. Nearly every nursery participates in Under 10 & 12 Festivals as well as in U/14 & U/16 Competitions (Under 19 teams do not form part of the Youth F.A. but of the Malta F.A.). The aim of the educational sports center, as the name denotes, was to educate children through sports. Although the Youth F.A. and all the nurseries do not refer directly to education in their names, the spirit of the aims remains those of forming the characters of children and youths through the game of football.

== Member clubs ==
Club	Locality
Attard Youth Nursery	Attard
Balzan Youths Youth Nursery	Balzan
Birzebbuga Windmills Youth Nursery	Birżebbuġa
Birkirkara Youth Nursery	Birkirkara
Dingli Swallows Youth Nursery	Dingli
Fgura United Youth Nursery	Fgura
Floriana Youth Nursery	Floriana
Ghaxaq Youth Nursery	Għaxaq
Gudja United Youth Nursery	Gudja
Gżira United Youth Nursery	Gżira
Ħamrun Spartans F.C. Youth Nursery	Ħamrun
Kalkara Youth Nursery	Kalkara
Kirkop United F.C. Youth Nursery	Kirkop
Lija-Iklin Youth Nursery	Lija
Luqa Youth Nursery	Luqa
Marsaxlokk Youth Nursery	Marsaxlokk
Melita Youth Nursery	St. Julian's
Marsa Youth Nursery	Marsa
Mellieħa S.C. Youth Nursery	Mellieħa
Mgarr United F.C. Youth Nursery	Mgarr
Mosta Youth Nursery	Mosta
Mqabba Youth Nursery	Mqabba
Msida Saint-Joseph F.C. Youth Nursery	Msida
Naxxar Lions F.C. Youth Nursery	Naxxar
Paola Hibernians Youth Nursery	Paola
Pembroke Athleta F.C. Youth Nursery	Pembroke, Malta
Pietà Hotspurs F.C. Youth Nursery	Pietà
Qormi F.C. Youth Nursery	Qormi
Rabat Depiro Youth Nursery	Rabat
San Gwann Youth Nursery	San Ġwann
Senglea Athletic F.C. Youth Nursery	L-Isla
Siggiewi Youth Nursery	Siġġiewi
Sirens F.C. Youth Nursery	St. Paul's Bay
Sliema Wanderers F.C. Youth Nursery	Sliema
Luxol St. Andrew's Youth Nursery	St. Andrew's
St. George's F.C. Youth Nursery	Bormla
St. Patrick F.C. Youth Nursery	Żabbar
Sta. Lucia Youth Nursery	Santa Lucia
Santa Venera Youth Nursery	Santa Venera
Sliema Wanderers F. C. Youth Nursery	Sliema
Tarxien Rainbows F.C. Youth Nursery	Tarxien
Valletta F.C. Youth Nursery	Valletta
Zebbug Rangers Youth Nursery	Żebbuġ, Malta
Zejtun Corinthians F.C. Youth Nursery	Żejtun
Żurrieq F.C. Youth Nursery	Żurrieq
