= Yeangel Montero =

Venezuelan footballer (born 1998)

Personal information
- Full name: Yeangel Emilio Montero Manzano
- Date of birth: 25 December 1998 (age 27)
- Place of birth: Higuerote, Venezuela
- Height: 1.79 m (5 ft 10 in)
- Position: Forward

Team information
- Current team: Naxxar Lions
- Number: 15

Youth career
- 40 Fútbol Club
- 2014–2018: Atlético Venezuela

Senior career*
Years	Team	Apps	(Gls)
2017–2020	Atlético Venezuela	21	(4)
2019	→ Estudiantes Caracas (loan)	7	(0)
2021	Carabobo	22	(4)
2022	Monagas	8	(1)
2022	UCV	13	(4)
2023	Mineros de Guayana	9	(2)
2023	Puerto Cabello	11	(0)
2024	Zamora	16	(2)
2025	Portuguesa	20	(1)
2026–	Naxxar Lions	9	(1)
- * Club domestic league appearances and goals as of 7 May 2026

Yeangel Emilio Montero Manzano (born 25 December 1998) is a Venezuelan footballer who plays as a forward for Maltese Premier League club Naxxar Lions.

== Club career ==
=== Atlético Venezuela ===
==== Early years ====
Montero is a product of Atlético Venezuela and joined the club at the age of 16 from 40 Fútbol Club. He was born and raised in Higuerote, approximately an hour and a half from Caracas, and in an interview Montero revealed, that he travelled more than three hours a day to be able to train with Atlético Venezuela.

In 2014, he debuted for the U-18s and in 2015 he scored 12 goals in 24 games for the team. In December 2016, Montero signed a two-year deal with the club, after a good season where he had been a protagonist for the U-18s and also had played for the U-20s, although his young age, where he scored 10 goals.

==== Promotion to the first team ====
After a stunning 2017 season with the clubs U-20 team, where he scored 20 goals and made 9 assists, becoming the topscorer of the team and helping them winning the U-20 championship in Venezuela, he signed his first professional deal with the club and was promoted into the first team squad for the 2018 season.

Montero got his official debut for Atlético Venezuela on 24 February 2018 against Aragua FC in the Venezuelan Primera División. He started on the bench, before coming on as a substitute for Cristian Alessandrini in the half time. He made a total of 12 league appearances in that season and scored four goals.

In 2019, Montero had a loan spell at Estudiantes Caracas, where he played seven league game for the team, before returning to Atlético Venezuela for the 2020 season. In 2020, Montero played six league games for Atlético Venezuela.

=== Later career ===
On 4 March 2021, Montero joined Carabobo. On 19 January 2022, Montero moved to Monagas. In June 2022, he joined fellow league club UCV. In February 2023, Montero moved to Mineros de Guayana.

In January 2024, Montero joined Zamora.

In January 2026, he moved to Maltese Premier League club Naxxar Lions.
