= 2015–16 Maltese Second Division =

The 2015–16 Maltese Second Division started in September 2015 and ended in May 2016. Msida Saint-Joseph F.C., Kirkop United F.C. and Żurrieq F.C. were relegated to the Maltese Third Division. Marsa F.C., Sirens F.C. and Gharghur F.C. were promoted to the Maltese First Division.

Marsa were crowned champions in the last game against Gharghur as they won 2–1. Additionally, Sirens lost the Derby against Mgarr United and handed the cup to the champions Marsa.

== Participating teams ==
- Birzebbuga St.Peters
- Sirens F.C.
- Mellieha
- Mgarr United
- Marsa F.C.
- Gharghur F.C.
- Msida St. Joseph's F.C.
- Swieqi United F.C.
- St. Patrick
- Kirkop United F.C.
- Zejtun Corinthians
- Zurrieq
- Qrendi F.C.
- Siggiewi F.C.

== Final league table ==
Pos	Team	Pld	W	D	L	GF	GA	GD	Pts	Promotion or relegation
1	Marsa (C)	26	18	3	5	47	14	+33	57	Promotion to 2016–17 Maltese First Division
2	Sirens (P)	26	16	6	4	48	21	+27	54	Promotion to 2016–17 Maltese First Division
3	Gharghur F.C. (P)	26	16	5	5	54	17	+37	53	Promotion to 2016–17 Maltese First Division
4	Zabbar St. Patricks	26	14	9	3	50	23	+27	51	
5	Mgarr United	26	13	4	9	47	37	+10	43	
6	Birzebbuga St. Peter's	26	11	6	9	46	32	+14	39	
7	Siggiewi	26	10	9	7	33	25	+8	39	
8	Qrendi	26	9	8	9	46	34	+12	35	
9	Zejtun Chorinthians	26	10	5	11	36	33	+3	35	
10	Mellieha	26	8	8	10	38	50	−12	32	
11	Swieqi United	26	7	5	14	26	37	−11	26	
12	Kirkop United (R)	26	5	5	16	25	43	−18	20	Relegation to 2016–17 Maltese Third Division
13	Żurrieq (R)	26	3	7	16	12	54	−42	13	Relegation to 2016–17 Maltese Third Division
14	Msida St. Joseph's (R)	26	1	2	23	13	91	−78	5	Relegation to 2016–17 Maltese Third Division

(C) Champions; (P) Promoted; (R) Relegated
