= Djibril Sylla =

Maltese footballer

Personal information
- Date of birth: 1 January 1980 (age 46)
- Place of birth: Guinea
- Position: Midfielder

Senior career*
Years	Team	Apps	(Gls)
1998–1999	Hamrun Spartans		
2000	Gozo		
2000–	Sliema Wanderers		
- Msida Saint-Joseph
2003–2004	Sliema Wanderers		
2004–	Hibernians		
2006	Rhyl		
- CA Bastia

International career
2000	Malta	4	(0)
- * Club domestic league appearances and goals

Djibril Sylla (born 1 January 1980) is a retired professional footballer. Born in Guinea, he was capped at international level by Malta and during his career played for teams in Malta, Wales and France.

== Career ==
=== Malta ===
He joined Sliema Wanderers in July 2003 Sylla made his unofficial debut for the Wanderers in a friendly 5-1 drubbing of the Nigerian Stars. After playing for the club infrequently over the next season he was released by club and joined Hibernians on transfer deadline day in August 2004.

=== Wales ===
He then moved to Wales, signing for Rhyl in March 2006.

=== France ===
He finished his career in France, playing for Corsican side CA Bastia.

== International ==
Sylla made four appearances for the Malta national football team during 2000, his debut was a second-half substitute's appearance in a friendly against South Africa. He started in Malta's 2002 World Cup qualifier at Northern Ireland in September 2000.
