= 2006–07 Maltese Second and Third Division Knock-Out =

2006–07 Second and Third Division Knock-Out
Tournament details
- Country: Malta
- Dates: 3 September 2006 – 25 May 2007
- Teams: 30

Final positions
- Champions: Balzan Youths
- Runners-up: Birżebbuġa St. Peter's

Tournament statistics
- Matches played: 49
- Goals scored: 163 (3.33 per match)

The 2006–07 Second and Third Division Knock-Out (known as quick Keno Second and Third Division Knock-Out for sponsorship reasons) was a knockout tournament for Maltese football clubs playing in the Second and Third Division.

The 30 participating teams were divided into eight groups, six having four teams each and the remaining two having three. The winning team from each group progressed to a direct elimination round.

== Group stage ==
=== Group 1 ===
Pos	Team	Pld	W	D	L	GF	GA	GD	Pts	Qualification	BZN	STA	LQA	XBX
1	Balzan Youths	3	2	0	1	12	1	+11	6	Advance to knockout phase	—	0–1	6–0	6–0
2	St. Andrews	3	2	0	1	5	1	+4	6			—	0–1	4–0
3	Luqa St. Andrew's	3	2	0	1	2	6	−4	6				—	1–0
4	Ta' Xbiex	3	0	0	3	0	11	−11	0					—

Source: MaltaFootball.com

=== Group 2 ===
Pos	Team	Pld	W	D	L	GF	GA	GD	Pts	Qualification	BBĠ	ŻBĠ	MDN	SĠW
1	Birżebbuġa St. Peter's	3	2	1	0	5	2	+3	7	Advance to knockout phase	—	0–0	2–1	3–1
2	Żebbuġ Rangers	3	1	2	0	3	1	+2	5			—	1–1	2–0
3	Mdina Knights	3	0	2	1	2	3	−1	2				—	0–0
4	Siġġiewi	3	0	1	2	1	5	−4	1					—

Source: MaltaFootball.com

=== Group 3 ===
Pos	Team	Pld	W	D	L	GF	GA	GD	Pts	Qualification	MLĦ	SVR	GŻR	GXQ
1	Mellieħa	3	3	0	0	11	3	+8	9	Advance to knockout phase	—	3–1	3–2	5–0
2	St. Venera Lightnings	3	2	0	1	7	3	+4	6			—	5–0	1–0
3	Gżira United	3	1	0	2	4	9	−5	3				—	2–1
4	Għaxaq	3	0	0	3	1	8	−7	0					—

Source: MaltaFootball.com

=== Group 4 ===
Pos	Team	Pld	W	D	L	GF	GA	GD	Pts	Qualification	LJA	ŻRQ	GĦR	PBK
1	Lija Athletic	3	3	0	0	11	0	+11	9	Advance to knockout phase	—	2–0	4–0	5–0
2	Żurrieq	3	2	0	1	6	4	+2	6			—	3–1	3–1
3	Għargħur	3	1	0	2	6	11	−5	3				—	5–4
4	Pembroke Athleta	3	0	0	3	5	13	−8	0					—

Source: MaltaFootball.com

=== Group 5 ===
Pos	Team	Pld	W	D	L	GF	GA	GD	Pts	Qualification	MLT	SLC	SIR	ŻTN
1	Melita	3	3	0	0	11	3	+8	9	Advance to knockout phase	—	5–2	1–0	5–1
2	St. Lucia	3	1	1	1	4	6	−2	4			—	1–0	1–1
3	Sirens	3	1	0	2	2	3	−1	3				—	2–1
4	Żejtun Corinthians	3	0	1	2	3	8	−5	1					—

Source: MaltaFootball.com

=== Group 6 ===
Pos	Team	Pld	W	D	L	GF	GA	GD	Pts	Qualification	DGL	MĠR	FGR	XJR
1	Dingli Swallows	3	3	0	0	16	1	+15	9	Advance to knockout phase	—	3–0	6–1	7–0
2	Mġarr United	3	1	0	2	7	0	+7	3			—	6–1	1–2
3	Fgura United	3	1	0	2	6	12	−6	3				—	4–0
4	Xgħajra Tornadoes	3	1	0	2	2	12	−10	3					—

Source: MaltaFootball.com

=== Group 7 ===
Pos	Team	Pld	W	D	L	GF	GA	GD	Pts	Qualification	RBT	QRD	KKR
1	Rabat Ajax	2	2	0	0	6	0	+6	6	Advance to knockout phase	—	1–0	5–0
2	Qrendi	2	1	0	1	3	1	+2	3			—	3–0
3	Kalkara	2	0	0	2	0	8	−8	0				—

Source: MaltaFootball.com

=== Group 8 ===
Pos	Team	Pld	W	D	L	GF	GA	GD	Pts	Qualification	GDJ	KKP	ATD
1	Gudja United	2	1	1	0	3	2	+1	4	Advance to knockout phase	—	2–1	1–1
2	Kirkop United	2	1	0	1	4	2	+2	3			—	3–0
3	Attard	2	0	1	1	1	4	−3	1				—

Source: MaltaFootball.com

== Knockout phase ==
Quarter-finals
23 December
Dingli Swallows	1
Gudja United	0
30 December
Balzan Youths	2
Mellieħa	1
23 December
Lija Athletic	0
Birżebbuġa St. Peter's	1
30 December
Rabat Ajax	3
Melita	1

Semi-finals
7 April
Dingli Swallows	0
Balzan Youths	1
7 April
Birżebbuġa St. Peter's (pen.)	1 (4)
Rabat Ajax	1 (3)

Final
25 May
Balzan Youths	2
Birżebbuġa St. Peter's	0

== See also ==
- 2006–07 Maltese Second Division
- 2006–07 Maltese Third Division
