= 2013–14 Maltese Second Division =

Maltese Second Division
- Season: 2013–14

The 2013–14 Maltese Second Division (also known as 2013–14 BOV 2nd Division due to sponsorship reasons) began on 13 September 2013 and ended on 26 April 2014.

== Participating teams ==
- Dingli Swallows
- Fgura United
- Gharghur
- Kirkop United
- Marsa F.C.
- Marsaskala F.C.
- Mdina Knights F.C.
- Mellieha
- Mqabba F.C.
- Pembroke Athleta
- San Gwann
- Senglea Athletics
- Siggiewi
- Żabbar St. Patrick F.C.

== Changes from previous season ==
- Zebbug Rangers, Msida SJ F.C, Zurrieq F.C. and St. George's F.C. were promoted to the 2013–14 Maltese First Division. They were replaced with Dingli Swallows and Mqabba F.C., relegated from 2012–13 Maltese First Division.
- Mgarr United F.C. and St. Venera Lightning F.C. were relegated to the 2013–14 Maltese Third Division. They were replaced with Senglea Athletics, Mdina Knights F.C., Marsa F.C. and Marsaskala F.C. all promoted from 2012–13 Maltese Third Division.

== Final league table ==
Pos	Team	Pld	W	D	L	GF	GA	GD	Pts	Promotion or relegation
1	Mqabba F.C. (C)	26	15	7	4	48	26	+22	52	Champions and promotion to 2014–15 Maltese First Division
2	Pembroke Athleta (P)	26	15	4	7	46	32	+14	49	Promotion to 2014–15 Maltese First Division
3	Fgura United (P)	26	13	10	3	36	15	+21	49	Promotion to 2014–15 Maltese First Division
4	San Gwann	26	13	7	6	52	37	+15	46	
5	Żabbar St. Patrick F.C.	26	12	10	4	45	20	+25	46	
6	Gharghur	26	11	6	9	46	38	+8	39	
7	Mellieha	26	9	10	7	32	26	+6	37	
8	Senglea Athletics	26	8	9	9	45	35	+10	33	
9	Marsa F.C.	26	8	7	11	37	49	−12	31	
10	Dingli Swallows	26	8	5	13	35	34	+1	29	
11	Siggiewi	26	8	4	14	36	56	−20	28	
12	Marsaskala F.C. (R)	26	6	9	11	28	46	−18	27	Relegation to 2014–15 Maltese Third Division
13	Kirkop United (R)	26	4	8	14	24	57	−33	20	Relegation to 2014–15 Maltese Third Division
14	Mdina Knights F.C. (R)	26	2	4	20	27	66	−39	10	Relegation to 2014–15 Maltese Third Division

Rules for classification: 1) points; 2) goal difference; 3) number of goals scored.
(C) Champions; (P) Promoted; (R) Relegated

== Results ==
Home \ Away	DIN	FGU	GHA	KIR	MAR	MSK	MDI	MEL	MQA	PEM	SGA	SEN	SIG	ZSP
Dingli Swallows		0–2	2–1	0–2	0–2	2–0	4–0	0–1	3–3	4–0	0–1	2–0	0–1	0–1
Fgura United	1–1		1–1	2–0	2–0	0–1	3–0	0–0	0–0	1–1	1–0	2–1	1–0	0–0
Gharghur F.C.	2–1	1–2		1–1	2–3	4–1	4–2	1–1	3–2	1–2	1–0	0–0	2–3	1–1
Kirkop United F.C.	2–1	1–1	1–3		1–2	0–0	0–2	2–4	0–2	0–4	1–2	2–2	1–1	2–5
Marsa F.C.	2–2	0–0	2–5	1–2		2–3	4–1	0–0	0–4	0–1	4–3	4–3	2–2	0–3
Marsaskala F.C.	1–3	0–3	2–1	1–2	2–2		3–2	2–1	0–1	1–3	3–3	0–4	2–3	0–0
Mdina Knights F.C.	3–2	0–2	0–1	2–2	1–3	1–1		2–2	0–2	2–4	1–2	2–5	1–2	0–5
Mellieha S.C.	1–3	0–2	2–0	0–0	1–0	1–1	3–1		0–3	0–0	1–2	0–0	4–0	1–1
Mqabba F.C.	2–2	2–0	2–0	5–0	1–0	0–0	2–1	1–0		2–2	2–3	2–4	3–0	1–0
Pembroke Athleta F.C.	2–1	1–0	3–1	5–1	5–0	0–1	1–0	0–1	0–0		1–0	2–1	1–2	1–3
San Gwann F.C.	1–0	2–4	2–4	4–0	1–1	1–1	1–1	1–1	5–0	4–1		2–1	2–0	3–2
Senglea Athletics	1–2	0–0	0–2	0–0	1–1	4–0	3–0	0–2	1–2	3–1	3–3		5–2	0–0
Siggiewi F.C.	0–0	2–5	1–3	4–1	2–0	1–1	3–2	1–4	1–3	3–4	2–3	0–1		0–2
Żabbar St. Patrick F.C.	2–0	1–1	1–1	3–0	1–2	2–1	2–0	3–1	1–1	0–1	1–1	2–2	3–0	

Legend: Blue = home team win; Yellow = draw; Red = away team win.

== Top 10 scorers ==
Goals	Player	Team
23	(Malta) Timothy Thomas	Senglea Athletic F.C.
16	(Albania) Leontiev Konda	Dingli Swallows
15	(Brazil) Guillerme Soares de Freitas	Gharghur F.C.
15	(Cameroon) Didier Tayou	Mqabba F.C.
13	(Nigeria) Joseph Okonkwo	Fgura United F.C.
13	(Malta) Nicholas Zammit	Pembroke Athleta F.C.
13	(Malta) Thomas Caruana	Żabbar St. Patrick F.C.
11	(Malta) Ayrton Buhagiar	Mdina Knights F.C.
11	(Malta) Alistair Camilleri	Mqabba F.C.
10	(Nigeria) Basil Chibueze	Marsa F.C.
