= 2007–08 Maltese Third Division =

Maltese Third Division
- Season: 2007–08

The Maltese Third Division 2007–08 (known as BOV 3rd Division due to sponsorship reasons) was the 8th season and started on 21 September 2007 and finished on 18 May.For the first time the Division was divided into two sections:A and B.Section A consisted of 10 teams and Section B of 9.The winners of Section A were Zebbug Rangers and those of Section B were Gozo FC.Both were promoted to the 2nd Division.The overall champions were Gozo FC who beat Zebbug 3-1.The match was abandoned on 57 minutes. The teams who finished 2nd and 3rd in each Section were to play in a promotion/relegation playoff with the 10th finishing place team of Second Division.These were Attard, Xghajra from Section A and Gzira and Gharghur from Section B.The 10th finishing team from Second Division were Mgarr.Mgarr won the play-off Final and therefore each team stayed in its respective Division.

== Participating teams ==
=== Section A ===
- Attard
- Fgura
- Ghaxaq
- Mdina
- Mtarfa
- Qrendi
- Siggiewi
- Xghajra
- Zebbug
- Zejtun

=== Section B ===
- Gharghur
- Gozo FC
- Gudja
- Gzira
- Kalkara
- Kirkop
- Luqa
- Pembroke
- Santa Lucia

== Changes from previous season ==
- Mgarr United, Sirens and Zurrieq were promoted to the Second Division. They were replaced with Gozo FC, Gudja United and Zebbug Rangers, all relegated from 2006–07 Maltese Second Division.

== Standings ==
=== Section A ===
Pos	Team	Pld	W	D	L	GF	GA	GD	Pts	Promotion or qualification
1	Zebbug Rangers (C, P)	18	13	3	2	37	13	+24	42	Promoted to 2008–09 Maltese Second Division
2	Attard	18	9	6	3	39	12	+27	33	Qualified for promotion-relegation playoffs
3	Xghajra Tornadoes	18	8	8	2	30	16	+14	32	Qualified for promotion-relegation playoffs
4	Mdina Knights	18	9	4	5	32	16	+16	31	
5	Qrendi	18	7	4	7	20	17	+3	25	
6	Fgura United	18	7	4	7	20	21	−1	25	
7	Siggiewi	18	7	2	9	37	38	−1	23	
8	Zejtun Corinthians	18	5	5	8	29	31	−2	20	
9	Ghaxaq	18	3	4	11	18	40	−22	13	
10	Mtarfa	18	2	0	16	16	74	−58	6	

(C) Champions; (P) Promoted

=== Section B ===
Pos	Team	Pld	W	D	L	GF	GA	GD	Pts	Promotion or qualification
1	Gozo FC (C, P)	16	15	1	0	40	14	+26	46	Promoted to 2008–09 Maltese Second Division
2	Gzira United	16	10	2	4	32	14	+18	32	Qualified for promotion-relegation playoffs
3	Għargħur	16	8	5	3	30	15	+15	29	Qualified for promotion-relegation playoffs
4	Pembroke Athleta	16	8	4	4	36	14	+22	28	
5	Gudja United	16	5	5	6	22	24	−2	20	
6	Luqa St.Andrews	16	5	4	7	18	28	−10	19	
7	Santa Lucia	16	4	1	11	22	39	−17	13	
8	Kalkara	16	3	4	9	15	37	−22	13	
9	Kirkop United	16	0	2	14	11	41	−30	2	

(C) Champions; (P) Promoted

== Champions playoff ==
Champions Play off

Team 1	Score	Team 2
Zebbug Rangers	1–3	Gozo FC

- Match abandoned on 57 minutes. Zebbug Rangers started a fight and the referee had to abandon the match. Gozo FC were winning 3-1 and that was taken as the final score. As a punishment, Zebbug started the 2008–09 Maltese Second Division with a five point deduction.

== Promotion-relegation playoffs ==
Quarter final

Team 1	Score	Team 2
Xghajra Tornadoes	1–0	Gharghur

- Gharghur remain in Maltese Third Division

Semi-finals

Team 1	Score	Team 2
Mgarr	1–0 (a.e.t.)	Xghajra Tornadoes
Attard	4–3 (a.e.t.) (3–4 p)	Gzira United

- Xghajra Tornadoes and Gzira United remain in Maltese Third Division

Final

Team 1	Score	Team 2
Mgarr United	1–0	Attard

- Mgarr United remain in Maltese Second Division
- Attard remain in Maltese Third Division

== Results ==
=== Section A ===
Home \ Away	ATD	FGR	GXQ	MDN	MTF	QRD	SGW	XJR	ZBG	ZTN
Attard		1–1	4–0	0–3	10–1	0–0	4–1	0–2	0–2	0–0
Fgura	0–3		1–0	1–0	1–0	2–0	0–1	1–1	1–3	2–1
Ghaxaq	0–3	1–0		1–2	3–1	0–2	0–7	0–3	1–1	2–5
Mdina	0–0	0–2	1–1		6–0	0–2	4–0	0–0	2–1	4–0
Mtarfa	0–1	1–5	0–4	1–2		0–6	1–6	0–4	2–3	0–2
Qrendi	0–0	2–0	2–1	0–1	1–2		1–1	0–1	0–1	1–0
Siggiewi	1–6	2–1	2–1	0–4	10–0	1–3		1–0	0–3	1–4
Xghajra	1–1	3–0	1–1	2–1	4–3	0–0	3–3		1–1	2–1
Zebbug	0–2	0–0	4–1	3–0	3–0	3–0	2–0	2–1		1–0
Zejtun	0–4	2–2	1–1	2–2	3–4	4–0	1–0	1–1	2–4	

Legend: Blue = home team win; Yellow = draw; Red = away team win.

=== Section B ===
Home \ Away	GHR	GZO	GDJ	GZR	KKR	KKP	LQA	PBK	SLC
Gharghur		1–3	1–1	1–2	3–0	4–2	0–0	1–1	1–0
Gozo FC	3–1		4–0	3–2	5–0	1–0	2–0	2–0	2–1
Gudja	0–3	1–2		0–2	2–2	5–1	4–1	0–2	4–1
Gzira	0–0	1–2	2–0		6–0	2–0	3–3	1–2	2–1
Kalkara	0–5	2–2	0–1	1–2		0–0	1–2	0–3	5–2
Kirkop	0–2	2–3	0–1	0–3	1–2		0–1	2–2	1–6
Luqa	1–2	1–2	1–1	0–3	1–1	3–1		1–3	1–5
Pembroke	2–2	1–2	1–1	1–0	0–1	4–0	0–1		11–0
St.Lucia	0–3	1–2	1–1	0–1	2–0	2–1	0–1	0–3	

Legend: Blue = home team win; Yellow = draw; Red = away team win.

== Top scorers ==
Section A
Goals	Player	Team
13	(Malta) Eman Ciappara	Siggiewi
11	(Malta) Matthew Francalanza	Mdina
10	(Malta) Firas Aboulezz	Attard

Section B
Goals	Player	Team
14	(Malta) Liam Camilleri	Pembroke
9	(Malta) Chris Camilleri	Gozo
8	(Malta) Anthony Portelli	Gozo
