= 2012–13 Maltese Second Division =

Football tournament

Maltese Second Division
- Season: 2012–13

The 2012–13 Maltese Second Division (also known as 2012–13 BOV 2nd Division due to sponsorship reasons) began on 14 September 2012 and ended on 28 April 2013.

== Participating teams ==
- Fgura United
- Gharghur United
- Kirkop United
- Mellieha S.C.
- Mgarr United
- Msida Saint-Joseph F.C.
- Pembroke Athleta
- San Gwann F.C
- Siggiewi F.C.
- St Georges F.C
- St. Patrick F.C
- St. Venera Lightning F.C.
- Zebbug Rangers
- Zurrieq

== Changes from previous season ==
- Gżira United and Gudja United were promoted to the 2012–13 Maltese First Division. They were replaced by St. Patrick F.C and St Georges F.C, relegated from the 2011-12.
- Attard F.C., Senglea Athletic F.C. and Luqa St. Andrew's F.C. were relegated to the 2012–13 Third Division. They were replaced by Pembroke Athleta, Fgura United and Mgarr United, all promoted from the 2011–12 Maltese Third Division.

== Final league table ==
Pos	Team	Pld	W	D	L	GF	GA	GD	Pts	Promotion or relegation
1	Zebbug Rangers (C)	26	19	5	2	66	25	+41	62	Champions and promotion to 2013–14 Maltese First Division
2	Msida SJ F.C (P)	26	15	7	4	51	29	+22	52	Promotion to 2013–14 Maltese First Division
3	Zurrieq F.C. (P)	26	14	8	4	43	26	+17	50	Promotion to 2013–14 Maltese First Division
4	St. George's F.C. (P)	26	13	10	3	51	25	+26	49	Promotion to 2013–14 Maltese First Division
5	San Gwann F.C	26	12	8	6	49	34	+15	44	
6	Fgura United F.C.	26	12	5	9	49	39	+10	41	
7	Pembroke Athleta F.C.	26	10	7	9	42	30	+12	37	
8	Siggiewi F.C.	26	8	5	13	40	48	−8	29	
9	Mellieha S.C.	26	7	7	12	28	44	−16	28	
10	Kirkop United	26	7	6	13	26	44	−18	27	
11	St. Patrick F.C	26	8	2	16	26	43	−17	26	
12	Gharghur United F.C.	26	5	7	14	32	42	−10	22	
13	Mgarr United F.C (R)	26	3	8	15	25	55	−30	17	Relegation to 2013–14 Maltese Third Division
14	St. Venera Lightning F.C. (R)	26	4	5	17	34	73	−39	17	Relegation to 2013–14 Maltese Third Division

(C) Champions; (P) Promoted; (R) Relegated

== Results ==
Home \ Away	FGU	GHA	KIR	MEL	MGA	MSJ	PEM	SGW	SIG	STG	STP	STV	ZEB	ZUR
Fgura United		2–0	2–0	1–2	4–0	3–2	2–4	4–1	6–2	1–1	1–3	5–3	3–0	1–0
Gharghur United	1–0		0–3	2–2	0–0	0–3	0–4	2–2	2–2	0–1	2–3	7–1	0–0	1–1
Kirkop United	1–2	3–2		0–0	3–1	0–2	0–3	0–1	0–4	1–1	0–0	2–2	1–5	0–1
Mellieha	2–3	1–2	2–0		1–0	1–6	1–0	1–1	3–2	2–0	2–0	1–2	1–7	0–0
Mgarr United	2–2	0–4	1–4	1–1		0–5	2–2	1–1	1–4	0–1	2–0	3–1	2–2	0–2
Msida SJ F.C	1–0	3–2	2–1	0–0	2–1		0–0	0–4	1–0	1–1	3–0	3–1	2–2	1–1
Pembroke Athleta	1–1	2–1	0–1	1–0	1–1	1–2		2–3	3–0	2–2	2–0	2–2	0–2	1–2
San Gwann	3–1	3–1	2–0	2–1	1–0	0–2	0–3		1–2	1–3	2–2	6–1	1–1	0–0
Siggiewi	0–0	1–0	4–1	1–1	1–1	2–2	3–0	1–5		0–1	1–2	2–1	0–2	1–4
St. George's	5–1	7–1	1–1	3–1	4–0	1–1	1–0	1–1	3–2		3–0	2–2	4–2	1–1
St. Patrick	2–1	0–1	1–2	2–0	3–0	0–1	1–2	0–0	1–3	1–0		4–2	1–3	0–1
St. Venera	1–2	0–0	1–1	2–0	0–3	1–5	0–4	0–2	3–1	1–3	2–0		0–5	1–3
Zebbug Rangers	1–1	3–1	3–0	4–1	2–0	4–0	2–1	2–0	2–1	1–0	2–0	4–2		2–1
Zurrieq	1–0	2–1	0–1	2–1	4–3	3–1	1–1	3–3	2–0	1–1	2–0	3–2	2–3	

Legend: Blue = home team win; Yellow = draw; Red = away team win.

== Top 10 scorers ==
Goals	Player	Team
22	(Nigeria) Osi Lucky Agboebina	St Georges F.C
22	(Brazil) Mauricio Rodrigues Britto	Zebbug Rangers
18	(Malta) Shaun Vella	San Gwann F.C
17	(Malta) Josef Dalli	Fgura United
16	(England) Eddie Wileman	St. Venera Lightning F.C.
14	(Nigeria) John Roland Emeka	Pembroke Athleta
13	(Brazil) Fernando Donizete de Andrade	Msida Saint-Joseph F.C.
13	(Malta) Giovanni Galea	Mellieha S.C.
13	(Malta) Roderick Farrugia	Siggiewi F.C.
12	(Malta) Ronnie Celeste	Msida Saint-Joseph F.C.
12	(Malta) Gilbert Martin	Fgura United
