= Anthony Eviparker =

Nigerian footballer

Personal information
- Full name: Anthony Omoefe Eviparker
- Date of birth: 7 December 1985 (age 40)
- Place of birth: Nigeria

Senior career*
Years	Team	Apps	(Gls)
2001/2002	Nadur Youngsters F.C.		
2002–2003	Marsa F.C.		
2003–2004	Balzan F.C.		
2004	Marsa F.C.		
2004	Yeovil Town F.C. (trial)		
2005–2006	Floriana F.C.		
2006–2007	Xagħra United F.C.		
2007–2009	Vittoriosa Stars F.C.		
2009	Sektzia Ness Ziona F.C.		(4)
2010	Maccabi Herzliya F.C.		(4)
2010–2011	Maccabi Be'er Sheva F.C.	11	(3)
2011	FC Gütersloh 2000	0	(0)
2012	Balzan F.C.	6	(0)
2012–2013	TuS Viktoria Rietberg		
- SW Marienfeld
2014	VfB Fichte Bielefeld		
2014	Vittoriosa Stars F.C.	7	(6)
2015	SW Marienfeld		
2015/2016	Aramäer Gütersloh		
2016/2017	Assyrer Gütersloh		
2017/2018	ASC Suryoye Gütersloh		
2018/2019	FC Türk Sport Bielefeld		

Managerial career
- ASC Suryoye Gütersloh
- * Club domestic league appearances and goals

Anthony Eviparker (born 7 December 1985) is a Nigerian footballer and coach who has played competitively in Israel, Malta and Germany. He aided the Vittoriosa Stars' 2009 promotion to the Premier League. Eviparker has stated that Nigeria should not be circumspect in promoting the Nigeria Professional Football League and that they should "upgrade the footballers' profile".

== Career ==
=== Israel ===
Anthony Eviparker received a contract with Ness Ziona's 2009 squad. He shared the same Hebrew name as retired basketball player Anthony Parker, and hoped to have similar success in Israel as his namesake. He left Ness Ziona at the conclusion of 2009, having scored four goals with the club. He finished the season with Mazzabi Herzliya, partnering with Odinaka Ezeocha upfront, and registered four goals. A few months later, he joined Maccabi Be'er Sheva, making 3 goals in 11 appearances.

=== Malta ===
Transferring to Balzan on 12 November 2003, Eviparker scored two goals to hold Floriana 2–2 on his debut with the club, but was investigated by the Malta Football Association regarding his apparent status as an amateur rather than a professional. Reaching an agreement with Floriana the final day of the January 2005 transfer window, he then changed clubs, spending 2007/08 with Vittoriosa Stars where he was penalized with a three-month ban due to insulting the referee that October. Later scoring three goals to defeat St Patrick 3–1 and four to down St George's 7–3, the Reds extended his contract to summer 2009, when he secured their promotion to the Premier League with two goals over Mosta. However, over the course of his years in Malta, the Nigerian experienced racism from his teammates and the public.

=== Germany ===
On the roster of TuS Viktoria Rietberg from 2012 to 2013, Eviparker buried two hat-tricks with the club. However, he was not allowed to compete with SW Marienfeld in late April 2015, because the German Football Association restricts footballers to two teams per season, and he had been on the books of two sides – VfB Fichte Bielefeld and Vittoriosa Stars – before Marienfeld.
