= 2006–07 Maltese Third Division =

Maltese Third Division
- Season: 2006–07
- Dates: 24 September 2006 – 7 May 2007
- Champions: Mġarr United
- Promoted: Mġarr United; Sirens; Żurrieq
- Top goalscorer: Lawrence Vella (16 goals)
- Highest scoring: Ta' Xbiex 1–11 Qrendi (12 March 2007)

The 2006–07 Maltese Third Division (referred to as the BOV Third Division for sponsorship reasons) was the league season of the Maltese Third Division which spanned from 24 September 2006 until 7 May 2007.

== Teams ==
A total of 19 teams participated in the 2006–07 Third Division. Mdina Knights made their league debut after they were founded in 2006, while Qrendi rejoined the Maltese football league system after a nine-year absence following their last appearance in the 1996–97 Second Division season. At the end of the season, a series of promotion-relegation play-off matches are contested by the teams finishing between third and fifth place in the Third Division and the tenth-placed team in the Second Division; the winner, acquires promotion to the Second Division.

== League table ==
Pos	Team	Pld	W	D	L	GF	GA	GD	Pts	Promotion, qualification or relegation
1	Mġarr United (C, P)	18	12	6	0	34	6	+28	42	Promotion to the Second Division
2	Sirens (P)	18	12	5	1	32	7	+25	41	Promotion to the Second Division
3	Żurrieq (O, P)	18	12	4	2	33	8	+25	40	Qualification for promotion-relegation play-offs
4	Fgura United	18	12	3	3	34	14	+20	39	Qualification for promotion-relegation play-offs
5	Qrendi	18	9	7	2	32	11	+21	34	Qualification for promotion-relegation play-offs
6	Għargħur	18	9	5	4	34	14	+20	32	
7	Luqa St. Andrew's	18	9	2	7	29	20	+9	29	
8	Pembroke Athleta	18	6	8	4	23	14	+9	26	
9	Għaxaq	18	7	3	8	33	32	+1	24	
10	Siġġiewi	18	7	1	10	30	33	−3	22	
11	Kalkara	18	6	3	9	26	33	−7	21	
12	Mdina Knights	18	5	5	8	25	25	0	20	
13	Gżira United	18	5	5	8	21	26	−5	20	
14	Attard	18	5	2	11	27	28	−1	17	
15	Xgħajra Tornadoes	18	4	5	9	20	26	−6	17	
16	Żejtun Corinthians	18	5	2	11	31	45	−14	17	
17	Kirkop United	18	4	5	9	21	36	−15	17	
18	St. Lucia	18	3	3	12	13	31	−18	12	
19	Ta' Xbiex	18	2	0	16	9	98	−89	6	

Source: RSSSF
(C) Champions; (O) Play-off winners; (P) Promoted

== Results ==
Home \ Away	ATD	FGR	GĦR	GXQ	GŻR	KKR	KKP	LQA	MDN	MĠR	PBK	QRD	SĠW	SIR	SLC	XBX	XJR	ŻTN	ŻRQ
Attard	—			0–2			0–2 (Note: Kirkop United were awarded a 2–0 win after a protest. Originally, Attard won the encounter 2–0.)	0–0	0–2	0–2	0–2					8–0		5–1	1–5
Fgura United	1–1	—		3–2	1–0		2–0		3–1	0–1	1–1			0–0	3–1				
Għargħur	3–0	1–0	—			1–2			2–1			1–1	2–0	1–1	2–0		0–1		
Għaxaq			0–3	—		6–1	1–1	1–3		0–3	1–1					7–0		6–4	0–4
Gżira United	2–0		1–1	1–1	—					0–1		0–3	4–2	0–0		2–3			1–2
Kalkara	1–0	0–1			2–0	—			1–1			0–0	2–5	1–3	1–3		0–3		
Kirkop United			1–1		2–3	2–5	—	3–2					2–1			1–0	1–1	2–3	0–2
Luqa St. Andrew's		0–2	1–0		3–2	3–0		—				2–4	2–0				1–2	4–2	0–1
Mdina Knights				0–1	3–1		4–1	1–4	—	1–4	0–0					6–0		2–4	0–0
Mġarr United			3–1			0–0	1–1	0–0		—			4–2			7–0	2–0	2–0	0–0
Pembroke Athleta			0–1		1–1	1–0	3–0	1–0		1–3	—					6–0		0–0	0–1
Qrendi	1–0	0–1		4–0			1–1		2–1	0–0	1–1	—		1–2	1–0				
Siġġiewi	1–3	1–2		1–0					0–1		1–1	1–2	—	0–2	2–1		2–1		
Sirens	2–0			2–1			4–0	2–1	1–0	0–0	1–0			—	1–0	9–0			
St. Lucia	1–6			1–2	0–0		2–1	0–1	0–0	0–1	1–2				—	1–0			
Ta' Xbiex		1–9	1–7			0–7		0–2				1–11	1–6			—	2–0	0–3	0–6
Xgħajra Tornadoes	0–3	1–2		0–2	0–1				1–1		2–2	0–0		1–1	5–0		—		
Żejtun Corinthians		2–3	0–6		1–2	3–1						0–1	2–3	0–1	2–2		3–2	—	
Żurrieq		1–0	1–1			1–2						0–0	1–2	1–0	1–0		3–0	3–1	—

Source: RSSSF

== Play-offs ==
Pos	Team	Pld	W	D	L	GF	GA	GD	Pts	Promotion, qualification or relegation	ŻRQ	FGR	ŻBĠ	QRD
1	Żurrieq (P)	3	3	0	0	5	0	+5	9	Promotion to the Second Division	—	2–0		
2	Fgura United	3	2	0	1	4	2	+2	6			—	1–0	3–0
3	Żebbuġ Rangers (R)	3	1	0	2	1	3	−2	3	Relegation to the Third Division	0–2		—	1–0
4	Qrendi	3	0	0	3	0	5	−5	0		0–1			—

Source: RSSSF
(P) Promoted; (R) Relegated

== Season statistics ==
=== Top scorers ===
Rank	Player	Club	Goals
1	(Malta) Lawrence Vella	Għargħur	16
2	(Malta) Clint Ellul	Fgura United	15
3	(Malta) Godwin Mifsud	Żejtun Corinthians	13
4	(Malta) Bjorn Dalli	Għaxaq	12
5	(Malta) Carlo Leonardi	Pembroke Athleta	11
6	(Malta) Adrian Galea	Sirens	10
6	(Malta) Pierre Spiteri	Siġġiewi	10
8	(Malta) Alessandro Pirrone	Luqa St. Andrews	9

=== Hat-tricks ===
Player	For	Against	Result	Date
(Malta) Daniel Zammit	Żurrieq	Żejtun Corinthians	3–1	29 September 2006
(Malta) Kevin Tonna	Kalkara	Ta' Xbiex	7–0	17 November 2006
(Malta) Alex Azzopardi	Xgħajra Tornadoes	St. Lucia	5–0	19 November 2006
(Malta) Andre Cachia	Pembroke Athleta	Ta' Xbiex	6–0	27 November 2006
(Malta) Pierre Spiteri	Siġġiewi	Ta' Xbiex	6–1	10 December 2006
(Malta) Lawrence Vella^{6}	Għargħur	Ta' Xbiex	7–1	14 January 2007
(Malta) Clint Ellul	Fgura United	Mdina Knights	3–1	19 January 2007
(Malta) Josef Axisa^{4}	Attard	Ta' Xbiex	8–0	22 January 2007
(Malta) Alessandro Pirrone	Luqa St. Andrews	Mdina Knights	4–1	2 February 2007
(Malta) Adrian Galea^{4}	Sirens	Ta' Xbiex	9–0	19 February 2007
(Malta) Ryan Theuma	Sirens	Ta' Xbiex	9–0	19 February 2007
(Malta) Bjorn Dalli	Għaxaq	Żejtun Corinthians	6–4	15 April 2007
(Malta) Godwin Mifsud	Żejtun Corinthians	Għaxaq	4–6	15 April 2007
(Malta) Lawrence Vella	Għargħur	Żejtun Corinthians	6–0	23 April 2007
(Malta) Pierre Spiteri	Siġġiewi	Kalkara	5–2	27 April 2007
(Malta) Clint Ellul^{4}	Fgura United	Ta' Xbiex	9–1	30 April 2007
(Malta) Matthew Spiteri	Fgura United	Ta' Xbiex	9–1	30 April 2007

== See also ==
- 2006–07 Second & Third Division knock-out
