= Siġġiewi F.C. =

Maltese football club

- Full name: Siġġiewi Football Club
- Nickname: Stripes - Yellows
- Founded: 1945; 81 years ago, as Siġġiewi United F.C.
- Ground: Siġġiewi Sports Complex, Siġġiewi
- President: Roderick Farrugia.
- Manager: Simon Agius
- League: National Amateur League
- 2021–22: National Amateur League, Group A, 7th
Home colours	Away colours

Siġġiewi F.C. is a football club from the village of Siġġiewi in Malta. Founded in 1945, it currently plays in the Maltese National Amateur League. Their home kit colours are red and yellow.

== History ==
The first football team in Siggiewi was formed in 1945 by a group of amateurs, who used to play casual football in a field at Ta' Kandja. Reggie Pace, Ninu Mallia and Freddie Curmi were the main promoters of the game. Mr Emilio Camilleri, who had settled in the village during the war period and was an influential person within the circles of the Malta Football Association, helped the team to be admitted in the third division of the Maltese Football League for the 1946–47 season.

Siġġiewi's first ever match was a friendly match against Pioneer Corps in 1944. Siġġiewi won the match two-nil. Siġġiewi made their competitive debut on 11 November 1945 in a match valid for the Anglo Maltese Minors Cup. Siġġiewi, who back then used to play in red shirts and white shorts, faced Vittoriosa Rovers and lost heavily by the score of five-nil. Almost a year later, specifically on 13 October 1946, Siġġiewi debuted in the Maltese third division under the name Siġġiewi United. Siġġiewi faced Sliema Amateurs and the latter scored three goals without reply from Siġġiewi. Siġġiewi United participated in the 1947–48 season, which ultimately was the last time the team played under that name. Indeed, after sitting out the 1948–49 season, Siġġiewi participated in the 1949–50 season, however this time under the current name of Siġġiewi F.C.

The team continued to play in the Third Division for many years until, in 1970–71, they won one of the sections of the Third Division for the first time and were promoted to the Second Division. They won the Third Division again in 1973–74 and 1989–90. In the 1996–97 season, Siggiewi FC were promoted for the first time to the First Division, the second tier of the Maltese football league system. Siġġiewi plied their trade in the First Division for just two seasons, as they reverted to the lower divisions after 1998–99, where they have remained ever since.

Mr Karmenu Vassallo was the first president of the club, and he retained the post for the next eight consecutive years. Mr Nicholas Pace was chosen as the first secretary. Thereafter, these postes were held by several other persons. For instance, Gozitan-born Mr Anthony Buttigieg, served as president for 23 years and in 1987 he was nominated honorary president for life. Mr Reggie Pace and the well-known sports personality Mr John Debattista, both occupied the post of secretary for many years.

In 1972, Siġġiewi FC managed to obtain on lease the land at Hesri, where the present Siggiewi Ground now stands.

== Siġġiewi Sports Complex ==
As part of the MFA programme of assisting member clubs and affiliated associations to improve their facilities, the association's President Norman Darmanin Demajo inaugurated a synthetic pitch at Siġġiewi which will serve the locality's footballers, including the youths and youngsters in the nursery, in their development. The synthetic pitch was inaugurated during the 2010/2011 season.

Present for the ceremony were Siġġiewi F.C President and Committee, Robert Musumeci (former mayor of Siġġiewi) and Clyde Puli (former parliamentary secretary for youth and sport).

== Youth sector ==
Siġġiewi is also the mother club of its nursery, the Siġġiewi Football Club Youth Nursery. The youth nursery, caters for children aged between 5 and 16 years, was established in 1992 and is affiliated with the Malta Youth Football Association. The youth nursery participates in the under-15 league organised by the Malta Youth FA.

== Futsal ==
Siġġiewi F.C. Futsal competed in the Maltese Futsal League until 2022. In their last season, they finished 9th out of 11 teams in the league, winning in the second stage the Challenger League with a 3–2 win over St George's in the final.

== Players ==
As of 31 January 2024

=== Senior squad 2022–2024 ===
Note: The same squad number may be used by more than one player. If that is the case, the last player who have used the number is assigned with it.
Note: Flags indicate national team as defined under FIFA eligibility rules; some limited exceptions apply. Players may hold more than one non-FIFA nationality.

No.	Pos.	Nation	Player
1	GK	MLT	Leon Seisun
19	MF	MLT	Ryan Farrugia
4	MF	MLT	Andre Farrugia
28	GK	MLT	Daylon Hili
2	MF	MLT	Jake Davies (V/CPT)
—	GK	MLT	Ryan Micallef
10	MF	MLT	Shylon Vella
12	GK	MLT	Gianluca Genovese
15	MF	MLT	Lincoln Micallef (CPT)
26	MF	MLT	Kieron Haber
23	DF	MLT	Kane Cruz Camilleri
21	DF	MLT	Tommy Debono
6	DF	MLT	Clyde Borg (V/CPT)

No.	Pos.	Nation	Player
18	MF	MLT	Tyrone Grech
11	FW	COL	Deison Cuero
16	DF	MLT	Johann Zarb
25	FW	MLT	Kyle Chircop
22	FW	GHA	Isaac Dankwah Ansanyi
5	DF	MLT	Ian Darmanin
24	MF	MLT	Dylan Attard
17	MF	MLT	Matthew Farrugia
9	MF	MLT	Miguel Busuttil
7	FW	MLT	Kurt Borg
20	FW	MLT	John Paul Delia
13	MF	MLT	Kyle Spiteri
14	MF	MLT	Diandre Grima

== Club officials and coaching staff ==
=== Club officials ===
President	Roderick Farrugia
Vice President - Sporting Director	Kim Buhagiar
Vice President	Joenick Farrugia
General Secretary	Robert J Camilleri
Assistant Secretary	Julian Grech
Treasurer	Josef Saliba
Assistant Treasurer	Christopher Farrugia
Spiritual Director	Rev Fr.Josef Mifsud
Facilities Manager	Wayne Zerafa
Media officer	Andrea Costa
Academy Director	Owen Camenzuli
Nursery Manager	Isabelle Spiteri
Nursery Secretary	Mirana Agius Silvio
Nursery Treasurer	James Spiteri
Projects Coordinator	Christian Farrugia
Events Coordinator	Andrew Debattista

=== Coaching staff ===
Senior Team Coach	David Mifsud
Senior Team Assistant Coach	Ryan Micallef
Team Manager	Robert Camilleri
Under 21 Coach	Simon Agius

== Achievements ==
- Maltese Third Division: 1970–71, 1973–74, 1989–90

== Club statistics and records ==
=== League and cup history ===
Season	League									Top Scorer		Knockout/Cup	Youths		
Season	Div.	Pos.	Pl.	W	D	L	GS	GA	P	Name	Goals	Knockout/Cup	Div.	Pos.	Cup
1946–47	IIIB	6th	5	1	0	4	1	19	2			Did not participate			
1947–48	IIIB	6th	5	0	0	5	1	18	0			Did not participate			
1948–49	Did not participate														
1949–50	IIIA	7th	7	1	0	6	5	24	2			First Round			
1950–51	IIIA	7th	7	1	1	5	7	14	3			First Round			
1951–52	IIIA	8th	7	0	0	7	4	25	0			First Round			
1952–53	IIIB	8th	7	0	1	6	2	12	1			First Round			
1953–54	IIIB	4th	7	3	1	3	7	9	7			First Round			
1954–55	IIIB	7th	7	0	2	5	6	19	2			First Round			
1955–56	IIIA	6th	7	2	1`	4	7	16	5						
1956–57	IIIA	6th	7	1	1	5	3	12	3			First Round			
1957–58	IIIB	7th	7	1	1	5	4	13	3						
1958–59	IIIA	4th	7	3	1	3	2	6	7			First Round			
1959–60	IIIA	6th	7	1	2	4	5	13	4			Semi-Final			
1960–61	IIIB	5th	14	6	2	6	16	17	14			First Round			
1961–62	IIIB	3rd	14	6	5	3	17	10	17			First Round			
1962–63	IIIA	6th	14	4	1	9	10	19	9			Quarter-Final			
1963–64	IIIA	4th	14	6	1	7	19	14	13			First Round			
1964–65	IIIA	3rd	16	8	3	5	22	17	19			Quarter-Final			
1965–66	IIIC	1st	10	9	1	0	20	4	19			Semi-Final			
1966–67	IIIC	2nd	10	7	2	1	18	2	16			Semi-Final			
1967–68	IIIB	3rd	10	5	4	1	15	3	13			First Round			
1968–69	IIIC	5th	10	1	5	4	9	13	7			Quarter-Final			
1969–70	IIIA	2nd	10	6	2	2	15	5	14			Semi-Final			
1970–71	IIIA	1st	10	8	1	1	26	3	17			Quarter-Final			
1971–72	II	8th	18	4	5	9	10	20	13			Quarter-Final			
1972–73	II	10th	18	1	4	13	2	32	6			Preliminary Round			
1973–74	IIIA	1st	16	10	5	1	20	5	25			Semi-Final			
1974–75	II	9th	18	2	7	9	14	29	11			Quarter-Final			
1975–76	IIIA	3rd	12	5	2	5	16	14	12			First Round			
1976–77	IIIB	5th	12	3	4	5	5	9	10			First Round			
1977–78	IIIA	6th	12	4	1	7	6	12	9			First Round			
1978–79	IIIA	3rd	12	3	6	3	6	8	12			Preliminary Round			
1979–80	IIIA	4th	8	3	2	3	6	4	8			Quarter-Final			
1980–81	IIIB	4th	10	5	3	2	14	6	13			Quarter-Final			
1981–82	IIIA	4th	10	5	2	3	15	9	12			First Round			
1982–83	IIIA	4th	10	5	2	3	12	9	12			Quarter-Final			
1983–84	IIIB	4th	14	5	3	6	12	10	13			Second Round			
1984–85	IIIB	5th	12	3	5	4	12	14	11			First Round			
1985–86	IIIA	2nd	12	6	3	3	22	8	15			Quarter-Final			
1986–87	IIIA	3rd	12	5	2	5	18	21	12			Third Round			
1987–88	IIIA	5th	12	4	0	8	18	18	8			First Round			
1988–89	IIIB	2nd	14	12	1	1	43	5	25			Second Round			
2000–01	3rd	12th	22	0	7	15	15	47	7	(Malta) Donald Buhagiar	6	Quarter-final	Section C	2nd	Quarter-final
2001–02	4th	11th	15	4	3	8	25	35	15	(Malta) Roderick Farrugia	10	First round	Section B	4th	Preliminary
2002–03	4th	14th	15	3	6	6	17	24	15	(Malta) Roderick Farrugia	4	First round	Section B	8th	First round
2003–04	4th	11th	15	3	4	18	15	24	13	(Malta) Pierre Spiteri	4	First round	Section B	10th	Preliminary
2004–05	4th	8th	16	6	5	5	26	21	23	(Malta) Pierre Spiteri	6	First round	Section C	6th	Quarter-final
2005–06	4th	7th	16	9	1	6	30	23	28	(Malta) Josef Micallef	12	First round	Section C	4th	Second round
2006–07	4th	10th	18	7	1	10	30	33	22	(Malta) Pierre Spiteri	10	First round	Section C	1st	Second round
2007–08	4th	7th	18	7	2	9	37	38	23	(Malta) Eman Ciappara	13	First round	Section B	7th	First round
2008–09	4th	4th	16	7	4	5	26	20	25	(Malta) Pierre Spiteri	9	First round	Section B	9th	First round
2009–10	4th	5th	18	8	2	8	33	37	26	(Malta) Jason Camilleri	17	First round	Section C	9th	Second round
2010–11	4th	1st^	20	16	1	3	49	22	49	(Malta) Jason Camilleri	23	First round	Section D	2nd	Second round
2011–12	3rd	11th	26	7	6	13	31	51	27	(Malta) Roderick Farrugia	10	Third round	Section C	9th	First round
2012–13	3rd	8th	26	8	5	13	40	48	29	(Malta) Roderick Farrugia	13	Second round	Section D	12th	First round
2013–14	3rd	11th	26	8	4	14	36	56	28	(Ivory Coast) Mougnini Tape	8	Third round	Section E	1st	Second round
2014–15	3rd	7th	26	11	6	9	45	45	39	(Ivory Coast) Mougnini Tape	9	Fourth round	Section D	9th	Preliminary round
2015–16	3rd	6th	26	10	9	7	33	25	39	(Malta) Jason Camilleri	7	Second sound	Section E	1st	Second round
2016–17	3rd	6th	26	8	11	7	40	34	35	(Malta) Samuel Vella (Malta) Jason Camilleri (Cameroon) Didier Sohna	8	Third round	Section D	5th	First round
2017–18	3rd	5th	24	11	8	5	43	24	41	(Malta) Ian Montanaro	9	Third round	Section D	6th	First round
2018–19	3rd	13th	24	3	4	17	14	41	13	(Serbia) Marko Nikolic	6	Third round	Section D	5th	Second round
2019–220	4th	2nd	9	7	1	1	16	8	20	(Malta) Ronnie Celeste	6	Third round	Section D	5th	Second round

^ Siġġiewi, as winners of Section A, faced the winners of section B, Għargħur, in a play-off to determine the overall winners of the Third Division. Siġġiewi lost the match by three goals to two and therefore ended as runners-up.

=== Player statistics – most appearances ===
#	Name	Position	Years	Total
1	(Malta) Eman Ciappara	MF	1997–2022	300
2	(Malta) Jason Camilleri	MF	–2022	269
3	(Malta) Kim Buhagiar	MF	–2020	224
4	(Malta) Mark Camilleri	FW	–2018	215
5	(Malta) Pierre Spiteri	FW	−2013	201

Updated as at 1 April 2018.

== Literature ==
- Carmel Vella, SIGGIEWI (Città Ferdinand)- A Profile of History, Social Life and Traditions.
