= 2004–05 Maltese First Division =

Maltese First Division
- Season: 2004–05
- Champions: Ħamrun Spartans
- Promoted: Ħamrun Spartans; Mosta
- Relegated: Balzan Youths; Gozo
- Goals scored: 279
- Average goals/game: 3.1
- Top goalscorer: Jeremiah Ani (18)

The 2004–05 Maltese First Division (known as the MIA First Division for sponsorship reasons) started on 5 September 2004 and finished on 15 May 2005.

Ħamrun Spartans were promoted back to the Premier League after just one season away, following their relegation alongside Balzan Youths in the 2003–04 Premier League season. Mosta joined Ħamrun in securing place in the Premier League. Balzan suffered a consecutive relegation, and alongside Gozo were relegated to the 2005–06 Second Division.

== Changes from previous season ==
=== Team changes ===
==== From Second Division ====
Promoted to Premier League

- St. Patrick
- Lija Athletic

Relegated to Second Division

- Tarxien Rainbows
- Rabat Ajax

==== To First Division ====
Relegated from Premier League

- Balzan Youths
- Ħamrun Spartans

Promoted from Second Division

- St. George's
- Gozo

== Teams ==
Team	City
Balzan Youths	Balzan
Gozo	Gozo
Ħamrun Spartans	Ħamrun
Marsa	Marsa
Mosta	Mosta
Mqabba	Mqabba
Naxxar Lions	Naxxar
San Ġwann	San Ġwann
Senglea Athletic	Senglea
St. George's	Cospicua

== League table ==
Pos	Team	Pld	W	D	L	GF	GA	GD	Pts	Promotion or relegation
1	Ħamrun Spartans (C)	18	10	5	3	30	19	+11	35	Promotion to 2005–06 Maltese Premier League
2	Mosta	18	9	5	4	37	24	+13	32	Promotion to 2005–06 Maltese Premier League
3	Mqabba	18	9	4	5	33	19	+14	31	
4	Senglea Athletic	18	7	7	4	31	27	+4	28	
5	Marsa	18	7	5	6	38	33	+5	26	
6	San Ġwann	18	6	5	7	21	27	−6	23	
7	Naxxar Lions	18	7	2	9	29	35	−6	23	
8	St. George's (Note: St. George's were deducted 2 points due to the incidents in the match against Senglea Athletic.)	18	6	6	6	23	25	−2	22	
9	Balzan (R)	18	5	3	10	23	31	−8	18	Relegation to 2005–06 Maltese Second Division
10	Gozo (R)	18	1	4	13	14	39	−25	7	Relegation to 2005–06 Maltese Second Division

(C) Champions; (R) Relegated

== Results ==
Home \ Away	BAL	GOZ	ĦAM	MAR	MOS	MQA	NAX	SĠW	SEN	STG
Balzan Youths	—	5–0	1–1	3–2	1–2	1–3	1–3	0–0	2–0	1–3
Gozo	1–2	—	1–0	1–2	1–2	1–1	0–3	1–2	0–1	0–3
Ħamrun Spartans	1–0	0–0	—	2–1	3–2	3–2	4–2	2–1	3–4	2–0
Marsa	2–2	5–1	1–1	—	3–1	1–3	1–2	5–4	2–2	2–2
Mosta	3–1	3–2	1–0	3–1	—	2–1	2–3	3–3	6–0	0–0
Mqabba	2–0	5–2	0–0	0–1	0–3	—	2–1	3–0	2–0	3–0
Naxxar Lions	3–0	2–1	1–3	1–3	2–2	1–0	—	1–1	0–1	1–3
San Ġwann	0–1	0–0	0–2	3–1	1–1	1–1	4–1	—	1–2	0–0
Senglea Athletic	2–1	1–0	1–1	1–1	2–1	2–2	5–2	1–2	—	1–1
St. George's	3–1	2–2	1–2	1–4	0–0	0–3	2–0	2–1	0–2 (Note: The match between St. George's and Senglea Athletic was abandoned at the 77th minute with the result 1–2 in favour of Senglea Athletic after a fan attacked a linesman. The match was awarded to Senglea Athletic with a 2–0 score.)	—

Legend: Blue = home team win; Yellow = draw; Red = away team win.

== Top scorers ==
As of 15 May 2005

Rank	Player	Club	Goals
1	(Nigeria) Jeremiah Ani	Naxxar Lions	18
2	(Nigeria) Uchenna Anywanna	Mqabba	16
3	(Nigeria) Ikechukwu Chibueze	Mosta	13
4	(Malta) Stefan Sultana	Ħamrun Spartans	12
4	(Malta) Gilbert Martin	Marsa	12
