= Naxxar Lions F.C. =

Maltese football club

Naxxar Lions
- Full name: Naxxar Lions
- Nicknames: The Lions, Pride of the North
- Founded: 1920; 106 years ago
- Chairman: Omar Borg
- Manager: Winston Muscat
- League: Maltese Premier League
- 2023–24: Maltese Premier League, 6th
Home colours	Away colours	Third colours

Naxxar Lions Football Club is a professional football club from the town of Naxxar in northern Malta.

Their historical and arch-rivals are Mosta FC. A match between Naxxar Lions and Mosta FC, is known as the derby of the north, but because there are other derbies in northern Malta it is also known as the Northern Classic.

== History ==
Naxxar Lions Football Club is a football club from the town of Naxxar in the northern part of Malta. Founded in 1920, it was the first football club in the north of Malta.

The club enjoyed a very positive period in the 1940s. After spending several years languishing in the lower divisions, the team experienced a resurgence of success. In 1946, they secured promotion to the top-flight division after winning a decider against Ħamrun Liberty.

Michael Zammit Tabona was appointed club president from 1984. Tabona transformed the club and squad, resulting in three successive promotions between 1986 and 1989, entering the Premier Division for the first time in the club’s history. He established Naxxar Lions as one of the top teams on the island, competing for several years in the Maltese Premier Division. However, after being relegated from the top tier at the beginning of the new century, the club faced a difficult period and was eventually demoted to the Third Division.

Following a series of successful seasons, Naxxar Lions achieved back-to-back promotions: from the Third Division to the Second Division in 2009–10, and from the Second Division to the First Division in 2010–11. They maintained their First Division status in 2011–12, finishing in 6th place. In the 2012–13 season, under the presidency of Dione Drago, Naxxar Lions were promoted to the Maltese Premier League. After three consecutive seasons in the top flight, the club was relegated to the First Division, only to bounce back the following year with another promotion under the presidency of Pierre Sciberras.

In September 2017, Mr. Yahya Kirdi took over as president of Naxxar Lions Football Club. The club was relegated to the First Division on the final day of the Premier League season. During the 2018–19 campaign, Naxxar Lions defied expectations and secured a 4th-place finish in the First Division.

Pierre Sciberras was re-appointed as club president for the 2019–20 season, which was cut short in March 2020 due to the COVID-19 pandemic. The team finished in 4th place. Naxxar Lions participated in the BOV Challenge League during the 2020–21 season, which also ended prematurely due to the pandemic, finishing in 6th place with two matches not played.

In 2020, the club celebrated its 100th anniversary (1920–2020). Angelo Pullicino was appointed as club president in December of that year. During the 2021–22 season, Naxxar Lions again competed in the Challenge League, finishing 4th.

Naxxar Lions FC played in the BOV Challenge League (Season 2022–23). In January 2023, Naxxar Lions reached the Championship Pool target, finishing 2nd place. On March 12, Naxxar Lions FC were promoted to Premier League.

In the 2022–23 season, Naxxar Lions FC competed in the BOV Challenge League. In January 2023, they reached the Championship Pool and went on to secure 2nd place. On March 12, 2023, they earned promotion to the Maltese Premier League.

In the 2023–24 season, Naxxar Lions FC competed in the BOV Premier League and achieved a 6th-place finish — the club's highest-ever league ranking.

In the 2024–25 season, Naxxar Lions FC maintained their status in the Maltese Premier League. It was a challenging campaign, with the club securing survival thanks to crucial performances in the latter stages of the season. A key victory against Balzan and a decisive win over Melita proved vital in ensuring top-flight football for another year.

=== Club Committee ===
- President: Adrian Fenech
- Vice President: Simon Camilleri
- Vice President: Krista Chetcuti
- Vice President: Pierre Sciberras
- Secretary: Shaun Camilleri
- Treasurer: Jonathan Carachi
- Members: Clivert Burke / Francesco Mercieca / Martin Attard / Nicholas Micallef / Sandro Galea / Silvio Attard / Victor Micallef
- Club Manager: Omar Borg

=== Technical Staff ===
- Head coach - Winston Muscat
- Assistant Coach - Leslie Noel Burke
- Team Managers - Christopher Mangion / David Vella
- Kit Manager - Adrian Ciappara
- Physical Trainer - Trevor Fenech
- Physiotherapist - Bernard Von Bronkdorff
- Assistant Kit Managers - Clivert Burke / Dwayne Cauchi / Nicholas Micallef
- Youths Coach - Etienne Vella
- Club Doctor - Dr. Christopher Deguara
- Nursery Head Coach - Etienne Vella / Quelin Spiteri
- Club Administrator - Adrian Ciappara
- Website & Social Media Administrator - Shaun Camilleri

== Current squad ==
As of 7 February, 2026

Note: Flags indicate national team as defined under FIFA eligibility rules; some limited exceptions apply. Players may hold more than one non-FIFA nationality.

No.	Pos.	Nation	Player
1	GK	MLT	Matthias Debono
3	MF	BRA	JP Iseppe
4	DF	BRA	Theo Kruger
5	DF	BRA	Gustavo Felipe
7	MF	MLT	Mark Fenech
8	MF	MLT	Neil Pace Cocks
9	FW	FRA	Louis Pahama
10	FW	BRA	Edson Farias
11	FW	BRA	Vitinho
12	GK	MLT	Andre Fenech
14	DF	MLT	Christian Gauci
15	FW	VEN	Yeangel Montero
17	FW	MLT	Felippe Bugeja
18	MF	MLT	Daniel Letherby

No.	Pos.	Nation	Player
19	MF	BRA	Rosiel
20	FW	BRA	Gabriel Costa
21	MF	MLT	Mattias Micallef (on loan from Birkirkara)
22	DF	CMR	Cedric Kontchou
23	MF	MLT	Deisler Agius
24	FW	BRA	Vinícius Baiano
26	MF	MLT	Tristan Vella
29	MF	MLT	Jake Borg
30	MF	FRA	Sekala Guehi
31	MF	MLT	Mike Hudson
33	DF	BRA	Joao Moura
99	GK	MLT	Andriy Vella
--	DF	BRA	Neto

== Honours ==
- 1st Division Champions: 1987–88, 1993–94, 2012–13
- 2nd Division Champions (2nd level): 1945–46
- 2nd Division Champions (3rd level): 1986–87
- 3rd Division Champions: 1985–86
- 2nd & 3rd Division Knock Out Cup Winners: 1985–86
- 3rd Division Knock Out Cup Winners: 1971–72
