= Jovica Milijić =

Serbian-born Maltese futsal player

Jovica Milijić Јовица Милијић
Personal information
- Full name: Jovica Milijić
- Date of birth: 20 January 1986 (age 40)
- Place of birth: Knjaževac, then SFR Yugoslavia, now Serbia
- Height: 1.84 m (6 ft 1/2 in)
- Position: Fixo

Team information
- Current team: Valletta
- Number: 5

Youth career
- ? – 1999: Timočanin
- 2000–2004: Pietà

Senior career*
Years	Team	Apps	(Gls)
2006–2007	European Pilot Academy		
2007–2009	Aluserv		
2008	Scandals (loan)		
2009	White Eagles		
2009–2011	Paola Downtown		
2011–2012	Naxxar Motors		
2012–2013	Lija Athletic		
2013–2014	Balzan		
2014–15	Ħamrun Spartans		
2015–22	Valletta		
2022–23	St George's		
2023–24	ZRQ Bormla		
2024-	Marsaskala Legends		

International career^{‡}
2013–	Malta	19	(4)

Managerial career
- 2023-24: St George's (assistant)
- 2025-: Marsaskala Legends
- * Club domestic league appearances and goals as of 30 March 2018 ‡ National team caps and goals as of 30 March 2018

Jovica Milijić (Serbian Cyrillic: Јовица Милијић, pronounced [jɔ̂ʋitsa miliːjit͡ɕ]; born 20 January 1986) is a Serbian-born Maltese futsal player and manager who plays as fixo, currently playing and managing Marsaskala Legends, the member of Maltese Futsal League. He was named the Malta Football Association's Futsal Player of the Year for three consecutive seasons in 2016, 2017, and 2018.

Prior to joining the team from Marsaskala, Milijić had played for as many as twelve different local futsal clubs, including Aluserv, White Eagles, Balzan, and Ħamrun Spartans, but he established his reputation during a seven-year spell with one of the island's most prominent teams, Valletta with whom he won the national championship in 2016, and 2019, and the Super Cup twice. During the 2010–11 season, while playing for Paola Downtown, Milijić was the league’s top scorer with 42 goals.

Milijić holds a dual Serbian and Maltese citizenship, having been naturalized in 2012 while playing for Lija. He made his debut for the falcons in early 2013 and went on to represent his adopted homeland for the next decade.

== Early life ==
Milijić was born in Knjaževac, a town and municipality located in the Zaječar District of the eastern Serbia, which at the time was a part of SFR Yugoslavia.

In Malta, he is known by the nickname Jozza, a stylised form of his Serbian nickname Joca (Serbian Cyrillic: Јоца, pronounced [jôtsa]) which is commonly used among Serbs named Jovan or Jovica.

== Club football career ==
Milijić made his first football steps with Timočanin in the mid-1990s, becoming a member of the promising generation together with the brothers Marinković, Nebojša and Nenad.

Soon after family relocation to Malta in 1999, he joined Pietà Hotspurs, a Maltese club famous for producing talented footballers in its youth school.

== Club futsal career ==
=== European Pilot Academy ===
Milijić began playing futsal in 2006, during a period when the sport was at its peak in Malta, following several years of steady growth since the establishment of the first organized futsal league in 1999. That season, the Maltese futsal league system featured 64 teams, an increase of one from the previous year. The first touch with futsal Milijić had in the jersey of European Pilot Academy's futsal club (formerly known as Serbia) where he won his first trophy - Maltese Futsal Knockout Cup for the season 2006-07. After several convincing victories against lower-tier clubs in the opening rounds of the cup, Milijić's team, European Pilot Academy, maintained their form in the semi-finals with a 12–3 win over Jeepers Handyman Centre, before defeating Swing Kids 10–5 in the final. Previously, European Pilot Academy had topped Section B of the First Division with 28 points, finishing seven points ahead of runners-up Jeepers Handyman Centre. The playoffs were played in a one-round robin league format, and Milijić was close to win his first championship as that season European Pilot Academy was a point behind the title winner Jeepers.

=== Aluserv Futsal Club ===
After a successful debutant season, Milijić joined newly promoted futsal top-tier Aluserv from Naxxar. The team that were made for an instant success won the league stage and cup, emerging as the revelation of that year's First Division campaign, but were defeated in the play-off semi-final, just like in the season 2008–09. At the time, three Aluserv players were already representing the National Team. Despite a heavy 3–6 defeat in the final round against Jeepers, Aluserv finished the league stage at the top of the standings with 30 points from 12 matches, level with second-placed European Pilot Academy. They secured first place due to a superior goal difference of +49, the best in the league, although this advantage did not translate into success during the play-offs. Particularly disappointing was the early elimination from the cup competition, where Aluserv suffered a 2–1 defeat to Los Street Boyz in the first round. It was Milijić's last match in the red-white jersey as soon after it he left the club.

=== Scandals ===
In August 2008, Milijić was loaned to Scandals Futsal Club, the reigning Maltese champions. The team included several Maltese internationals such as Benny Gialanze, Nebojša Mijailović, and Jeanbert Gatt, as well as Serbian player Željko Aničić. The club aimed to strengthen its squad ahead of its debut participation in European competition. His international competition debut was at 2008–09 UEFA Futsal Cup preliminary round against the Slovenian 2008 champion KMN Gorica on 23 August 2008. The match was played in Helsinki and Scandals were heavily defeated (0–11). Milijić was also on the pitch in the other two games but Scandals couldn't avoid another two losses against the Finnish champion Golden (2–6) and Irish side St Patrick's (3–4). In the match against the Irish League's representative, with Milijić in the starting lineup, Scandals missed a huge opportunity after leading (2–1 and 3–2) to win the first point for any Maltese club in a UEFA futsal competition.

=== White Eagles ===
During the summer break, Milijić decided to sign a short-term contract for White Eagles, then the reigning Maltese champions. The club represented a large Serbian diaspora in the island and was composed of ethnic Serbs players representing or coming from various countries, among them the most notable ones: Željko Aničić, Aleksandar Ribić, Nebojša Mijailović, and Ilija Milivojša. The contract was valid only for the Preliminary round of the 2009–10 UEFA Futsal Cup held in August 2009 in Kaunas, the capital of Lithuania.

In the opening match held at the S. Darius and S. Girenas Sport Center, the Maltese side equalized three times before finally going down 4–3 to KF Tirana, with hat-trick hero Rigers Sina grabbing the winner with five minutes remaining. With his debut goal in the 23rd minute, Milijić managed to equalize the result to 2–2, giving hope to the White Eagles. However, even Ribić’s second goal later in the match was not enough for the Eagles to avoid a narrow defeat against KF Tirana.

In a high-scoring match against Lithuanian side Nautara, Milijić scored the opening goal for the White Eagles in the eighth minute to reduce the score to 1–2. Despite two hat-tricks from Ribić and Mijailović, the Maltese side suffered a 7–9 defeat to the team from Kaunas.

In the final match of Group E in the 2009–10 UEFA Futsal Cup preliminary round, White Eagles earned the first-ever point for a Maltese club in European futsal competitions, following a 1–1 draw with FC Madriu from Andorra. As in the previous two games, Milijić was included in the starting lineup.

White Eagles therefore finished third in the group, having a better goal difference than the Andorran side. With two goals in three matches, Milijić was the team's third-highest scorer, behind Ribić with five goals and Mijailović with three.

=== Paola Downtown ===
After another European stint, Milijić signed for a newly promoted club from the Second Division. Paola Downtown had demonstrated its ambition by finishing second in the league stage, just two points behind champions Naxxar Motors. However, with an impressive goal-scoring tally and consistent results, ZC Excess overcame Naxxar Motors and Paola Downtown - who had finished first and second in the preliminary league - to win the 2009–10 title.

During his stay in Paola Downtown, Milijić was named for the top scorer of 2010–11 Maltese Futsal First Division with 42 goals, nine goals ahead the second-placed Clint Cope from ZC Excess. The same season he was nominated for the best futsal player but the award went into the hands of the Romanian Anton Florin. The club from Paola finished both seasons as the league vice-champion but the 2010 play-off and both cup competitions ended in the semi-finals. At the end of Milijić's last season in the club, in a thrilling final, ZC Excess Futsal Club edged out Paola Downtown on penalties after 2–2 in the regular time.

The team from Raħal Ġdid had limited success in the cup, suffering heavy defeats to ZC Excess in consecutive seasons. They were eliminated in the second round in 2010 following a 7–0 loss, and in the semi-finals in 2011 after an 11–2 defeat.

=== Naxxar Motors ===
After a disappointing season, in 2011 Milijić decided to accept an offer from Naxxar Motors. The ambitious club representing Naxxar, a small town in the Northern Region, had acquired a host of leading players. The 2011–12 campaign also marked the first season of the Maltese Futsal League under the management of the Futsal Malta Association. After the round-robin series of matches in the ten-team MFA 1st Division Futsal League, Naxxar Motors finished second, just a single point behind ZC Excess.

In the semi-finals, Paola Downtown, Milijić's previous club, was swept by Naxxar Motors (6–5 and 3–2). However, in the finals, ZC Excess won the trophy edging the Naxxarin in the second game (2-2, 4–2 after penalties) after the previous win in the first leg (5–3).

The cup run was also unsuccessful, as Naxxar Motors, after a swift progression through the earlier rounds with wins over Fugazi 5 (9–3), Luxol (6–5), and Paola Stars (16–2), were eliminated in the semi-finals following a heavy 1–6 defeat to Paola Downtown.

=== Lija Athletics ===
Before the start of the 2012–13 season, Lija Athletic replaced Naxxar Motors and Milijić became the captain of the newly formed club. He even scored a hat-trick on his debut against Valletta (7–1). The following week, Milijić delivered another influential performance as the Lijani continued their strong start to the season with a commanding 8–0 victory over Sliema.

However, the very start of the season wasn't that successful under Milijić's captaincy, as Lija missed their first chance to secure a trophy, falling 4–5 to Balzan in an entertaining Super Cup final after initially leading by two goals.

During mid-season, the team from Ħal Lija suffered a disappointing 1–5 defeat to Tarxien Rainbows, a direct rival for the final play-off spot. In the following round, they bounced back in a high-scoring encounter against Valletta, winning 10–7. Lija Athletic trailed 4–2 at half-time, but captain Jovica Milijić turned the game around with an outstanding performance, scoring five goals in the second half. Lija held firm in the upper section of the league standings following a 6–3 win against tax-Xelin's futsal section, who came into the match on a positive run, with captain Jovica Milijić once again leading the charge by scoring a brace.

After defeating second-tier Marsa 10–0 and Valletta 5–0 in the first two rounds of the cup, Lija Athletic faced Balzan in an entertaining derby match, where they missed a huge chance to progress further. They enjoyed a bright patch in the second half, scoring three goals with captain Jovica Milijić distinguishing himself. However, with four minutes remaining and the score 4–1 in Lija’s favour, Balzan mounted a dramatic comeback to erase the three-goal deficit and ultimately win the match 8–7 on penalties.

Although Lija Athletic had the highest ambitions, the cup journey was ended yet in the quarter-final and play-off was missed, for the first time in Milijić's career.

=== Balzan ===
The following season, Milijić left Lija Athletic and joined Balzan, a club that had signed several high-profile Romanian and Catalonian internationals during the summer. The most notable among them was Gabriel Dobre, who was appointed player-coach. His impact was immediate, scoring in a commanding 5–1 victory over Hibernians in the Super Cup final. The match marked the beginning of a highly successful campaign in which Balzan won all available trophies.

The Balzani began the season in dominant fashion, with Milijić playing a key role in their series of high-scoring victories. He scored against Żurrieq (8–1), Pembroke Athleta (8–2), netted a brace against Luqa St. Andrews (10–1), recorded a haul against Swieqi United (17–1), scored against Birżebbuġa St. Peter's (12–4), added another goal against Hamrun Spartans (14–3), and scored twice against Vittoriosa Stars (10–2). Overall, the club from It-Tliet Irħula registered eight consecutive wins, scoring a total of 86 goals before suffering their first defeat at the end of January, a 1–2 loss to Hibernians.

Until the end of the league campaign, Milijić added goals in victories over Mosta (14–0), Qormi (6–0), and Pembroke Athleta (7–3). However, the club from Balzan dropped points in more challenging encounters, including a 5–5 draw against Luxol - in a match that was heading into Balzan’s favour after going 5–1 ahead but the team from Pembroke fought back and got the draw - and Hibs (1–1), ultimately finishing behind both teams in the first stage. Nevertheless, after another derby against Luxol, which Balzan won 5–3, the team went on to finish second in the Championship Pool.

Before the start of the 2014 play-off, Balzan successfully defended the cup they had won the previous season. Milijić contributed to the campaign by scoring in the quarter-final against Swieqi (10–0). In the final, the team from Three Villages secured another dominant win, defeating Vittoriosa Stars 9–2.

After overcoming Luxol in the Play-off semi-finals with back-to-back victories (3–2 and 5–3), Balzan advanced to the final against former champions Hibernians. The final, held at the Corradino Pavilion, was a tightly contested affair. Having secured a win in the first leg (8–7), the team from Balzan entered the return leg with a psychological advantage and sought to manage the tempo of the game. Both sides created several chances during the 40 minutes of regulation time, but the match ended in a draw (4-4), leading to a dramatic penalty shoot-out. The Balzanin triumphed 9–8 on penalties, completing a perfect season and claiming the championship title. Milijić was among the successful scorers in the shoot-out, contributing to the club's historic achievement. Under the guidance of player-coach Gabriel Dobre, Balzan celebrated a remarkable treble of domestic honours.

In August 2014, shortly before Balzan’s third participation in the UEFA Futsal Cup against Croatian side MNK Alumnus in Zagreb, Jovica Milijić departed from the club. He was part of a mass exodus of key players from Balzan. Others included player-coach Gabriel Dobre, Emil Răducu, Andrea Dan, Željko Aničić, Reuben Grech, and Christian Wismayer.

=== Hamrun Spartans ===
During the summer 2014, Milijić joined Ħamrun Spartans, one of the most prominent futsal teams in Malta. After a disappointing seventh-place finish in the previous season, the Ħamruniżi entered the new campaign with high ambitions. He made the official debut for his new club on 9 October in a dramatic match against newly promoted Valletta. He even managed to score 50 seconds before the end of the match, securing a powerful start for the Ta' Werwer side.

Milijić's was again among the scorers during Ħamrun’s second consecutive win, a 9–0 victory over Żebbuġ Rangers. Two weeks later, he was among the scorers in a 7–4 victory over local rivals Valletta. Despite a strong performance from the Citizens, Ħamrun emerged as the stronger side on the day. At the beginning of February 2015, Milijić scored twice in another convincing 10–2 victory over the Żebbuġin. The team from Ħamrun finish the league phase at the second place, just a point shy of first placed Luxol. After a 3–5 defeat in a derby match against Balzan, with Frane Despotović and Mark Zammit playing key roles, Ħamrun were awarded a walkover in the final round against Swieqi United's futsal team and secured second place before the start of the playoffs.

In the playoffs semi-final, after a 7–6 victory in the first leg, Milijić's team, despite leading 3–2 at half-time, lost the return match 4–7 after extra time. Goals were scored at both ends, but in the final moments Balzan's forward Zammit converted a pass from Marev to make it 5–4, sending the match into extra time and allowing the defending champions to advance to the final against Luxol.

After a 7–5 win over second-tier Mellieħa, the Spartans faced Qormi in a much-anticipated quarter-final clash of the cup. The Qormin advanced to the semi-finals after defeating Ħamrun 8–5 in a hard-fought contest at the Corradino Pavilion. The Spartans came up against Qormi goalkeeper Gaetan Mallia, who was in fine form, blocking numerous shots, including attempts by Milijić. Nevertheless, he scored twice during the game and later took on the role of flying goalkeeper, as the team from Tas-Sikkina reduced the deficit to 5–6 and pressed for an equaliser. It wasn't a successful decision as Qormi advanced to the semi-finals, where they were defeated 6–0 by Luxol.

=== Valletta ===
Milijić joined Valletta FC Futsal in June 2015 as an experienced player who had already won every possible honor. He joined the club as part of an ambitious project, after it had reached the semi-finals of both the national league and the cup in the previous season. He remained at Città Umilissima for seven years, during which he claimed two league titles, two cups, two super cups, and three consecutive Maltese Best Futsal Player awards. Milijić was a key figure in Valletta's march to their first national title.

==== 2015–16 season ====
His debut came on 1 October 2015 in the Gatorade Knock-Out First Round, when City defeated Sliema Wanderers 9–5 after a stunning first-half display, during which Milijić scored one of Valletta's seven goals. However, Valletta's cup run was unsuccessful, ending in the quarter-finals when, in a closely contested derby, Luxol St. Andrews overturned their early lead to claim a 2–1 victory.

On 2 November 2015, Milijić scored twice as the Lilywhites defeated Ħamrun Spartans 11–4 in the Gatorade Super Cup semi-final. In the final, four days later, Milijić put Valletta ahead, and the team went on to establish a two-goal advantage by half-time. However, Luxol managed to level the score in the second half and forced extra time, eventually winning 9–5 with decisive goals from Frane Despotović and William Barbosa.

Valletta began the league stage with five consecutive victories, with Milijić scoring against Mqabba (7–2), Mdina (9–3), and twice against Msida (9–3). A draw against Ħamrun Spartans (4–4), despite holding a two-goal lead early in the second half, was followed by another convincing 8–0 victory over Sliema, with Milijić on the scoresheet. On 14 January, the Citizens recorded their first defeat in a derby against Lija Athletic. It was another match in a short period of time in which Valletta dropped points despite holding a two-goal lead, a margin established by Milijić's goal in the 26th minute. By the end of the first stage, the Lilywhites had recorded five consecutive victories with wide margins, including a 7–1 win in the final round over reigning champions and regular-stage leaders, Luxol. Prior to that match, Milijić had scored in a 13–0 win against Marsaskala Legends and in a 9–0 victory over Żebbuġ Rangers, then registered a hat-trick in an 18–0 win against the team representing Gozo, and added a brace in a 22–2 win against debutants from Qrendi.

The Citizens opened the Gatorade Elite Round with a 9–4 victory over Swieqi United, then Milijić's best game of the season came in March in a derby against his former club Lija Athletic, when he scored four goals in a 7–4 win. By the end of the league stage, Valletta had lost to both main title contenders, Ħamrun Spartans (2–7) and Luxol (1–4), so in the play-offs, they relied on the form of Slovenian international Dejan Bizjak and several experienced players, including Milijić. During his first season with Valletta, he scored 18 league goals.

After a narrow 5–6 defeat in the first leg of the semi-finals, the Citizens stunned Luxol with a 4–1 victory in the return match. In the 32nd minute, Milijić delivered a precise cross that resulted in a 2–0 lead, and later scored to seal the final result. The final was played as a best-of-three series. In the opening match, after a 6–6 draw in regular time, Ħamrun defeated the Lilywhites 7–6 on penalties, with Milijić successfully converting his attempt, but Ħamrun’s goalkeeper repelled Valletta's final shot. After one more brace coming from Bizjak, Valletta edged past the Spartans (7–6), to force the a decisive third match, in which Milijić delivered a vintage performance by scoring a hat-trick for a 10–4 win.

==== 2016–17 ====
In mid-August 2016, Valletta made their debut in European competition, suffering a defeat against Finnish side Sievi Futsal in the UEFA Futsal Cup Preliminary round, despite Milijić's opening goal early in the match. Milijić took part in a heavy 0–6 defeat against Georgian champions Tbilisi State University's futsal selection, before scoring a goal in a convincing 9–3 win over Scottish runners-up Wattcell Futsal Club.

The Citizens retained the core of the team that won the previous season's championship and added several new signings, including Brazilian striker Raphinha and other experienced Maltese players. Despite these reinforcements, Valletta finished as runners-up in the first stage of the league and placed third in the second stage, while also losing three finals to Luxol St. Andrews. Their run of defeats began on 11 November in the Super Cup, where they lost 7–4 to the Saints. Although Milijić went on a goal spree in the cup, scoring in each match - twice in a convincing 16–2 win over Tarxien Rainbows and in the first round against Swieqi United (5–3), then once in a derby match with Luxol St. Andrews that ended in a 7–2 victory. In the 6–8 defeat to Ħamrun Tre Angeli in the final, when the Lilywhites let slip a 4–1 lead, Milijić added another brace, totaling 7 goals in 4 cup games. During the season, he scored another 21 league goals, 4 in the play-offs, and 2 in the UEFA Futsal Cup, for a total of 34 goals.

Milijić began the league stage by scoring two consecutive hat-tricks, in a 20–1 win over Tarxien JMI and an 11–2 victory against Msida, followed by a brace in a 25–2 win over Qrendi and a goal versus the University of Malta in an 11–1 victory. Midway through the season, he scored in a 14–2 victory over Qormi before going on a scoring run in the final three rounds, after City had already secured a place in the Top 5, netting a hat-trick against Żurrieq Wolves (16–1) and braces against Swieqi Under-21 (18–1) and Luxol St Andrews in a 6–4 derby win.

In the Gatorade Elite Round, Valletta suffered defeats against both title rivals, Ħamrun Tre Angeli (5–6), where Milijić scored his only goal of the second stage, and Luxol (0–2). However, the Citizens advanced to the final after defeating Ħamrunizi 6–2 and 8–4 in the play-off semi-finals, completing a 14–6 aggregate victory with Milijić being on the scoresheet in both legs.

In the first match of the play-off final, contested in a best-of-three series, Luxol took an early lead within the opening minutes. Valletta equalized shortly after when Milijić advanced past a Luxol player and passed to Raphinha, whose intended strike was diverted into the net by Frane Despotović for an own goal. In the second half, goals from Despotović, Bizjak and Zammit secured a 5–2 victory for the St Andrew's side. In the second game, Bizjak and Răducu gave Luxol a 2–1 lead, which was overturned by Milijić, who scored twice—once at the end of the first half and again shortly after the restart following a successful counter-attack. Zammit's goal forced the match into extra time, which ended in a 4–4 draw, with the winner decided by a penalty shoot-out. Milijić scored in the shoot-out, while Valletta's goalkeeper saved Emil Răducu’s penalty. In the decisive third match, played in front of the season's largest crowd, Luxol captain Mark Zammit lifted the trophy following a 7–5 victory.

==== 2017–18 ====
During the regular stage, Valletta won all eleven matches, including derbies against Ħamrun Tre Angeli (5–3) and Luxol St. Andrews (4–2). In the latter match, played before a large crowd at the Corradino Pavilion, Milijić, connecting with an inviting cross by Gia Nikvashvili, tapped the ball home from close range in the closing minutes of the first half and added another early in the second half, giving his team a decisive lead. In the tactically disciplined encounter, despite two goals from Mark Zammit later in the match, the Saints were unable to draw level. Meanwhile, Valletta suffered a major disappointment after being eliminated in the quarter-finals of the cup by the eventual winners, the University of Malta.

In the Elite Group derby against Luxol, Valletta suffered their only defeat during both league phases, losing 0–5 and finishing level on points with the St. Andrew's side. In another derby at the same stage, the Citizens secured a convincing 8–2 victory over Ħamrun, and Milijić was on target in the second half. However, with Milijić in the starting line-up, City lost 2–1 to Luxol in the Pre-Play Offs Decider, allowing the Saints to finish on top of the Elite's table. It was a balanced and highly tactical encounter, with both teams employing the flying goalkeeper.

After a 5–1 and 4–2 double win in the play-off semi-finals against Ħamrun, Valletta convincingly won the first leg of the final against Luxol, 5–1. In the second leg, following a goalless first half, Milijić scored to put the Citizens ahead. The match ended 2–2 in regular time after Emil Răducu equalised, sending the tie to a penalty shoot-out, where the City ultimately prevailed 3–2, which qualified the team from the capital for the 2018–19 Champions League tournament held in North Macedonia.

=== St. George's Bormla ===
The following summer, Milijić signed for St. George's, the finalists of the previous season's edition of the FMA Futsal Challenger Cup with an ambition of going a step further that season. He scored his debut goal in the blue-and-white kit during a defeat to Swieqi United, reducing the score to 1–4. In the final two rounds of the first stage, Milijić scored two additional goals—one in a 5–5 draw against Ta' Xbiex and another in a 5–3 victory over Marsaskala. It was only enough to secure a place in the Challenger Futsal League, as the Bormla side narrowly missed out on qualifying for the Premier League in the second phase of the championship. Before the start of the cup phase, St. George's recorded four wins in the league stage, with Milijić scoring once in an 8–1 victory over Fgura United.

In March 2023, Milijić played a key role in helping the Cospicua side win the Enemed Futsal Challenger Cup. After scoring a goal in a convincing 10–3 semi-final win over Marsascala Legends in Pembroke, Milijić netted a brace in a 6–2 victory against Żurrieq in the final, held at the NSS Pavilion in Pembroke. After a balanced first half, St. George's dominated the second half to secure the title.

=== ZRQ Bormla ===
In July 2023, ZRQ Bormla Futsal announced Jovica Milijić as their first signing ahead of the new season, with the player also set to assist the head coach in his duties. This marked Milijić's first official coaching role. Soon after, the Cospicua side announced the signing of Serbian international Darko Ristić, marking their first foreign acquisition.

With Milijić on the team, the side from Cospicua had a strong start in the first four rounds. Aside from a 4–4 draw against the powerhouse from St. Andrew's, ZRQ Bormla recorded three convincing wins with a combined goal difference of 29–3. In the most recent of those victories, Milijić scored twice in an 11–0 win over the debutants from Gżira United Santa Margerita Futsal. He struck again with a brace in late November, as Ta' Xbiex FC Futsal Izola Bank were comfortably beaten 10–3. A few weeks later, the Bormliżi, featuring the youngest roster in the league, unexpectedly struggled against the Malta FA U18, but a goal from Milijić ultimately secured the win (5–3). Meanwhile, Milijić was unfortunate to score an own goal, during a convincing 8–2 victory over Marsaskala, a game in which his compatriot Darko Ristić impressed with a brace.

After Milijić's four goals in a 6–0 victory over Sliema Wanderers, ZRQ Bormla moved closer to the league leaders, and the final match of the first phase of the championship against Swieqi United proved to be decisive. The Swiqin started the match well, establishing a three-goal lead, but the Cospicua side remained calm and responded with four goals - the second one scored by Milijić - to turn the score in their favour and win 4–3.

ZRQ Bormla began the second phase of the championship with a match against Luxol, with both teams level on points. Despite trailing 1–5 against the eventual champions from St. Andrew's, the Bormliżi mounted a strong comeback, reducing the deficit to 4–5, with Milijić again among the scorers. Milijić returned ZRQ Bormla to winning ways by scoring the decisive goal in a 3–2 victory over Birżebbuġa St. Peter's. Shortly after the play-offs began, ZRQ Bormla were eliminated by Luxol in the semi-finals, suffering defeats in both legs with scores of 6–9 and 2–9.

Meanwhile, ZRQ Bormla had a successful run in the domestic cup, defeating Ta' Xbiex (4–2) in the quarter-finals and Swieqi United (6–1) in the semi-finals. In the latter match, Milijić scored a brace, bringing his season tally to 14 goals, including 12 in the league. In the final, Luxol was relentless, winning 8–0.

=== Marsaskala Legends ===
In June 2024, Milijić transferred to Marsaskala Legends, a club active in the league since the 2019–20 season with a record of consistent progress.

Although being a defender, Milijić made notable contributions on both ends of the pitch from his very first matches for the new club. He scored on his debut in October 2024, finding the net in a commanding 14–5 victory over the Malta FA Under-17 Futsal Team. In the next round, he struck again in one more dominant win over the Under‑19 team, another national selection competing in league. Later that year, he opened his scoring account for Skalin with a goal in a dramatic 4–4 draw against Swieqi United. In a balanced game, Swieqi United Futsal LEC 07 maintained the lead throughout, but Marsaskala Legends staged a strong comeback to secure a draw. At the beginning of December 2024, Marsaskala Legends moved up to third place in the standings with a commanding 10–3 victory over GZR Birżebbuġa. Milijić contributed to the win with a goal, as the team from M'Skala took control early and went into halftime leading 5–2. In the second half, they managed the game effectively to secure all three points.

In April 2025, in the final round of the Premier League, Milijić scored a hat-trick in a narrow 6–5 loss to University of Malta, showcasing his offensive ability despite the team's defeat. After finishing last in the Top 5 stage, the team from Marsaskala missed out on the playoffs but qualified for the Enemed Challenger Cup.

In the previous round, Marsaskala Legends suffered a heavy 1–8 defeat to Swieqi, with their only goal scored by Milijić.

Milijić's impact was most decisive during the 2024-25 edition of the minor cup competition, where, in the April 2025 semifinal, he scored a brace, helping the team from M'Skala prevail 5-4 and reach the final where Marsaskala were narrowly defeated 2–1 by Ħamrun SC NCMB. Milijić missed the final due to injury, and the Wied il-Għajn's side couldn't overturn a two-goal deficit, with their only goal coming late in the match.

Milijić concluded 2024-25 season with 10 goals and 10 assists in all competitions, highlighting his impact as both a defensive anchor and a creative presence.

In June 2025, he was appointed player–coach of Marsaskala for the 2025–26 season, taking on coaching duties while continuing to play.

== Malta national futsal team ==
In 2012 Milijić became a naturalized Maltese citizen and soon after started playing for the national futsal team. He had a debut in a heavy defeat against Georgia (0–9) in UEFA Futsal Euro 2014 qualifying at home ground in Paola, Malta on January 23, 2013. He was also in the starting line up against Moldova recording one more loss (1–4). Milijić is not the first Serbian player to represent the Malta national futsal team — several years earlier, Serbian-born Nebojša Mijailović and Branko Pantelić had also featured for Ħomor.

In 2014 Malta played only friendly games, three of them against Gibraltar (3–4, 4-2 and 1-0) and Serbia (1-4), Milijić participated in all of them scoring two goals and a few more times he was close to score hitting only the post, most notably against his homeland Serbia.

Next year Malta participated in the qualification for Euro 2016 and then the qualification for World Cup. The team lost all six games, three in each tournament, by the order: England (0-3), Andorra (0-4), Latvia (0-8), then France (2-8), Lithuania (1-2) and Albania (3-6). Milijić took a part in all matches and scored in the last two.

Between two tournaments, Malta went to San Marino and recorded two wins (5-1 and 5–3) with Milijić in the squad. He earned two more caps next year against the same national team, this time in Paola (4-0 and 2-2).

At the beginning of the last year, with Milijić in the starting five, Malta lost all three games in UEFA Futsal Euro 2018 qualifying tournament held in Bulgaria, against England (1-6), Bulgaria (1-6) and Albania (2-3).

Since his debut five years ago, Milijić has not missed any national team match, recording 19 caps and 4 goals in total.

=== FMA Futsal League Selection ===
In December 2017, Milijić was selected to join an FMA Futsal League selection composed of the best players, both local and foreign, who participated in the 2021–22 edition of the Maltese Futsal League. Besides Milijić, former Malta national futsal team coach Kevin Misfud and his assistant Željko Aničić selected a squad composed of the top players from the local league, led by national team and Luxol captain Mark Zammit, along with several foreign professionals.

The team faced Maritime Augusta, the reigning Serie B champions, who went on to win the Serie A2 title later that season and earned promotion to the Serie A the following year. The emerging Italian side, led by internationally experienced Spanish coach Eduardo García Belda, known as Miki, included guest players such as Brazilian futsal legend Falcão, then his compatriot Leandro Lino dos Santos and Spanish international José Miguel Ruiz Cortés. It was part of the Sicilian club's Falcão promotional tour. The exhibition match ended in a 5–5 draw, with Brazilian star scoring for both teams, once in each half.

== Style of play ==
Relatively tall for a futsal player, standing at 1.84 m (6 ft 0 in), Milijić combined his height with notable quickness and was occasionally deployed as a flying goalkeeper during his prime when his team required a goal. He operates as a fixo, having grown up playing association football in his native Knjaževac and later in Malta, where he mostly played as a midfielder. Although primarily a defender, Milijić's offensive abilities allowed him to contribute effectively in attack, and he finished as the top scorer in the Maltese Futsal First Division in 2011 while playing for Paola Downtown. On the pitch, he usually wears the number 5, the same as his boyhood idol Zinedine Zidane.

Milijić developed part of his technique and playing style through street football, having regularly participated in local amateur summer leagues since childhood. Among other achievements, he won the Super Cup organized by the Maltese Small Sided Football Association during the COVID-19 pandemic, when the Serbian-backed White Eagles defeated United Stars 10–7 at the Marsa Stadium.

== Coaching career ==
On June 9, Marsaskala announced Milijić's new role within the club - he had become a player/coach for the 2025–26 season. In his debut on the bench, the team from M'Skala recorded a 10–4 victory against a newly formed club from Santa Venera, with Milijić also providing an effective assist for one of the goals. His first signing as coach was former Georgian international player Gia Nikvashvili, who made his name in Malta playing for some of the country's most notable clubs, including Valletta, where he was Milijić's teammate for a few seasons, as well as Luxol, UOM, and the most recently Ħamrun.

Milijić's official debut as a player-coach came on 10 October 2025 in a 7–0 win over Futsal Selection U17, during which he also scored the opening goal. He scored a lob in the following match, contributing to another confident 9–2 victory over debutants St Venera Lightnings. Milijić suffered his first defeat in his dual role as player-coach on 16 November 2025, when the South Siders were convincingly beaten 0–7 by title challengers University of Malta.

== Career statistics ==
=== International caps ===
National team	Year	Competitive		Friendly		Total	
National team	Year	Apps	Goals	Apps	Goals	Apps	Goals
Malta	2013	2	0	0	0	2	0
Malta	2014	0	0	4	2	4	2
Malta	2015	6	2	2	0	8	2
Malta	2016	0	0	2	0	2	0
Malta	2017	3	0	0	0	3	0
Total		11	2	8	2	19	4

=== International goals ===
Scores and results list Malta's goal tally first

#	Date	Venue	Opponent	Score	Result	Competition
1	9 January 2014	Tercentenary Sports Hall, Gibraltar	Gibraltar	1–1	3–4	Friendly
2	11 January 2014	Tercentenary Sports Hall, Gibraltar	Gibraltar	3–1	4-2	Friendly
3	23 October 2015	Kaunas Sports Hall, Kaunas, Lithuania	Lithuania	1–0	1–2	2016 FIFA Futsal World Cup qualification (UEFA)
4	25 October 2015	Kaunas Sports Hall, Kaunas, Lithuania	Albania	3–6	3–6	2016 FIFA Futsal World Cup qualification (UEFA)

== Personal life ==
Besides his mother tongue, Serbian, Milijić speaks four other languages: English, Maltese, Italian and Russian.

== Honours ==
=== Club ===
European Pilot Academy

- Maltese Futsal Knockout Cup: 2006-07

Aluserv

- Maltese Futsal Knockout Cup: 2007-08

Naxxar Motors

- Maltese Futsal League championship runner-up: 2011–12
- Maltese Futsal League play-off runner-up: 2011–12

Paola Downtown

- Maltese Futsal League play-off runner-up: 2010–11

Balzan

- Maltese Futsal League: 2013–14
- Maltese Futsal Knockout Cup: 2013-14

Valletta

- Maltese Futsal League: 2015–16, 2017–18; runner-up: 2016–17
- Maltese Futsal Knockout Cup runner-up: 2016–17
- Maltese Futsal Super Cup: 2015, 2018, 2019; runner-up: 2016

St. George's Bormla

- FMA Futsal Challenger Cup: 2022-23

ŻRQ Bormla

- Maltese Futsal Knockout Cup runner up: 2023-24

=== Individual ===
Paola Downtown

- Maltese Futsal League top scorer: 2010–11

Valletta

- Malta Football Association's Futsal Player of the Year: 2016, 2017, 2018
