= 2013–14 Maltese Futsal Knockout Cup =

2013–14 Maltese futsal competition

Tournament details
- Host country: Malta
- Dates: 7 September 2013 - 9 May 2014
- Teams: 20

Final positions
- Champions: Balzan
- Runners-up: Vittoriosa Stars

2013–14 Maltese Futsal Knockout Cup, for sponsorship reasons also known as 2013-14 FXDD Futsal Knock-Out Cup, was a futsal competition in Malta, organized in a single-elimination format. Twenty teams entered the tournament, which began on 7 September 2013 and concluded with the final on 9 May 2014. Balzan claimed the title after a 9–2 victory over Vittoriosa Stars' futsal selection in the final.

== First Round ==
The major surprise of the first round was the elimination of Luxol St. Andrews by Hibernians, who secured qualification to the second round with a narrow 1–0 victory. Despite being strengthened by the arrivals of Anton Florin from Balzan and William Barbosa from Valletta, Luxol were denied on several occasions, while Hibernians found it difficult to break the deadlock. A late goal eventually gave the Paolites the win and confirmed their place in the next stage of the competition.

Team 1	Score	Team 2
Hibernians	1–0	Luxol
Msida St. Joseph	2–2 (7–6 pens)	GZR Birżebbuġa
Pembroke Athleta	5–4	Ħamrun Spartans
Zabbar St. Patrick	6–5	Kalkara
Zurrieq	9–4	Marsaskala
Fgura United	3–2	Santa Lucia

== Second Round ==
Team 1	Score	Team 2
Żabbar St. Patrick	5–4	Hibernians
Vittoriosa Stars	7–4	Melita
Balzan	6–1	Qormi
Gżira United	4–0	Msida St. Joseph
Żurrieq	8–4	Żebbuġ Rangers
Swieqi United	6–1	Naxxar Lions

== Quarter-Finals ==
Team 1	Score	Team 2
Balzan	10–0	Swieqi
Pembroke Athleta	2–1	San Ġwann
Żabbar St. Patrick	4–4 (5–4 pens)	Gżira United
Vittoriosa Stars	5–1	Żurrieq

== FXDD Knock-Out – Semi-Finals ==
Team 1	Score	Team 2
Vittoriosa Stars	?	Żabbar St. Patrick
Balzan	?	Pembroke Athleta

== Final ==
Balzan retained the 2013-14 FXDD Futsal Knock-Out Cup after defeating Vittoriosa Stars 9–2 in the final.

Team 1	Score	Team 2
Balzan	6–3	Vittoriosa

Winner: Balzan

== External sources ==
- FutsalPlanet – Competitions overview
- FutsalPlanet – Competitions and statistics
