= 2012–13 Maltese Futsal Knockout Cup =

2012–13 Maltese futsal competition

Tournament details
- Host country: Malta
- Dates: 7 September 2012 - 26 June 2013
- Teams: 20

Final positions
- Champions: Balzan
- Runners-up: Hibernians

2012–13 Maltese Futsal Knockout Cup was a futsal competition in Malta, organized in a single-elimination format. Twenty teams entered the tournament, which began on 7 September 2012 and concluded with the final on 26 June 2013. Balzan claimed the title after a 6–3 victory over Hibernians in the final. This edition of the cup was organized for the first time by the Futsal Malta Association.

== Preliminary Round ==
Team 1	Score	Team 2
Żejtun Corinthians	5–0	Vittoriosa Stars

== First Round ==
Team 1	Score	Team 2
Żejtun Corinthians	2–3	Balzan
Lija Athletic	10–0	Marsa
Pembroke Athleta	3–1	B'Bugia St Peters
Hamrun Spartans	2–0	Sirens
Mqabba	1–5	San Gwann
Mosta	3–0	Qrendi
Hibernians	8–0	Żurrieq
Swieqi United	3–2	St Andrews
Tarxien Rainbows	10–1	Ta' Xbiex
Mdina Knights	1–2	Msida St Joseph

== Second Round ==
Team 1	Score	Team 2
Melita	6–9	Balzan
Valletta	0–5	Lija Athletic
Sliema Wanderers	4–6	Pembroke Athleta
Gharghur	5–8	Hamrun Spartans
Floriana	7–4	San Gwann
Qormi	5–4	Mosta
Hibernians	11–1	Swieqi United
Tarxien Rainbows	11–1	Msida St Joseph

== Quarter-Finals ==
Team 1	Score	Team 2
Balzan	8–7	Lija Athletic
Pembroke Athleta	6–7	Hamrun Spartans
Floriana	11–5	Qormi
Hibernians	6–4	Tarxien Rainbows

== Semi-Finals ==
Team 1	Score	Team 2
Balzan	8–0	Hamrun Spartans
Floriana	0–6	Hibernians

== Final ==
Team 1	Score	Team 2
Balzan	6–3	Hibernians

Winner: Balzan

== External sources ==
- FutsalPlanet – Competitions overview
- FutsalPlanet – Competitions and statistics
