= 2025–26 Maltese Futsal League =

Maltese Futsal League
- Season: 2025–26
- Country: Malta
- Champions: to be determined
- Relegated: none
- 2025–26 UEFA Futsal Champions League: to be determined

The 2025–26 Maltese Futsal League, also known as Enemed Futsal League is the 28th season of the futsal championship in Malta, since the beginning of organized futsal in the country in 1999.

== 2025-26 UEFA Futsal Cup ==
In July 2025, Luxol St. Andrew’s were drawn into Group 3 of the 2025-26 UEFA Futsal Champions League Main Round Path A, where they were grouped with S.L. Benfica (Portugal), Riga Futsal Club (Latvia), and KMF Loznica-Grad 2018 (Serbia). The club was selected to host the mini-tournament, scheduled between 28 October and 2 November.

== Problems ahead the start of the season ==
The Maltese Futsal League faced a setback ahead of the 2025–26 season, as three clubs, Swieqi, Ta’ Xbiex, and Ħamrun, the current winner of the FMA Futsal Challenger Cup, decided not to register for the league. Among the reasons cited for their withdrawal were the lack of adequate training facilities and the financial unsustainability of competing at this level.

Six teams from the previous season, Luxol St Andrew's,University of Malta, Marsaskala Legends, Gżr Birżebbuġa St Peter's and under-19 and under-17 sides of the national futsal team remained in the league, while the MFA introduced three new clubs: Sliema Futsal Fort Fitness, Santa Venera Lightnings Futsal, and Żejtun Corinthians Futsal WA.

== Format ==
The 2025–26 season is being contested in a single round-robin format. After the regular stage, teams will split into the Premier and Challenger Leagues, with the top four clubs advancing to the play-offs. The semi-finals will be played over two legs, with extra time applied in the event of a tie, while the final will be decided in a best-of-three series. For the first time, all finals—including the Cup, Super Cup, and play-offs—will make use of Football Video Support (FVS) technology. Matches will continue to be broadcast live on the Futsal Malta YouTube channel.

The official draws for the 2025–26 Enemed Futsal League were held on 25 September 2025. The season premiered on 8 October 2025 with an opening match between Futsal Selection U17 and Marsaskala Futsal Legends. The team from Wied il-Għajn kicked off their campaign with a commanding 7–0 victory while Jovica Milijić scored the first goal of the season. Luxol recorded the biggest win of the round (22–1) in a match against Santa Venera Lightnings Futsal.
