= 2014–15 Maltese Futsal Knockout Cup =

2014–15 Maltese futsal competition

Tournament details
- Host country: Malta
- Dates: 11 October 2013 - 22 May 2014
- Teams: 21

Final positions
- Champions: Balzan
- Runners-up: Luxol

2014–15 Maltese Futsal Knockout Cup was a futsal competition in Malta, organized in a single-elimination format. Twenty-one teams entered the tournament, which began on 11 October 2014 and concluded with the final on 22 May 2015. Balzan claimed the title after a 5–4 victory over Luxol in the final.

== Maltese Futsal Cup 2014–15 ==
=== Preliminary Round ===
Team 1	Score	Team 2
Mellieħa	7–1	Msida
B'Bugia	5–8	Qrendi
Mqabba	1–8	Qormi
Luqa	0–13	Balzan
Valletta	6–0	Sirens

=== First Round ===
Team 1	Score	Team 2
Naxxar Lions	4–7	Gżira United
Balzan	5–1	Lija Athletic
Qormi	9–1	Mdina Knights
Valletta	5–1	Attard
Mosta	1–8	Luxol St. Andrews
Qrendi	3–11	Swieqi United
Żebbuġ Rangers	4–2	Siġġiewi
Mellieħa	5–7	Ħamrun Spartans

=== Quarter-finals ===
Team 1	Score	Team 2
Balzan	12–1	Gżira United
Valletta	8–2	Swieqi United
Ħamrun Spartans	5–8	Qormi
Luxol St. Andrews	9–4	Żebbuġ Rangers

=== Semi-finals ===
Team 1	Score	Team 2
Balzan	10–2	Valletta
Luxol St. Andrews	6–0	Qormi

=== Final ===
Balzan won the Gatorade Knock-Out after defeating Luxol St. Andrews's 5–4 in the final at the Corradino Pavilion, with Frane Despotović scoring a late decisive goal.

Team 1	Score	Team 2
Balzan	5–4	Luxol St. Andrews

Maltese Futsal Cup 2014–15 Winner: Balzan

== External sources ==
- FutsalPlanet – Competitions overview
- FutsalPlanet – Competitions and statistics
