= 2020–21 Maltese Challenge League =

Maltese Challenge League
- Season: 2020–21
- Dates: 27 September 2020 – 7 March 2021
- Relegated: Qormi
- Matches: 159
- Goals: 465 (2.92 per match)
- All statistics correct as of 11 April 2021.

The 2020–2021 Maltese Challenge League (referred to as the BOV Challenge League for sponsorship reasons), is the second-level league of football in Malta. This was the first season to take place under the new Challenge League brand.

Following an announcement by Prime Minister Robert Abela, both the Premier League and Challenge League were suspended from 10 March to 11 April 2021 due to the amount of COVID-19 cases increasing in Malta. This was followed by a government decision to extend the suspension, leading to the MFA ending the season prematurely. Due to the season ending without 75% of matches having taken place, both promotion to the Premier League and relegation to the Amateur League (apart from Qormi, who had already been relegated during the season) was suspended until the following season. The following season will have 22 teams split into two groups with the top two clubs earning promotion.

== Teams ==
Fifteen teams competed in the league which included the two teams promoted from the Second Division.

Team	Finishing position last season	Location	Stadium	Capacity
Fgura United	9th	Fgura	Gudja Ground	1,000
Marsa	1st in Second Division (promoted)	Marsa	Luxol Sports Ground	800
Marsaxlokk	3rd in Second Division (promoted)	Marsaxlokk	Marsaxlokk Ground	1,000
Mqabba	14th	Mqabba	Victor Tedesco Stadium	6,000
Naxxar Lions	4th	Naxxar	Centenary Stadium	2,000
Pembroke Athleta	5th	Pembroke	Luxol Sports Ground	800
Pietà Hotspurs	8th	Pietà		
Qormi	11th	Qormi	Thomaso Ground	500
Qrendi	3rd	Qrendi	Luxol Sports Ground	800
San Ġwann	2nd in Second Division (promoted)	San Ġwann	Centenary Stadium	2,000
St. Andrews	6th	St. Andrew's, Malta	Luxol Sports Ground	800
St. George's	13th	Cospicua	Centenary Stadium	2,000
Swieqi United	10th	Swieqi	Luxol Sports Ground	800
Vittoriosa Stars	12th	Birgu	Tony Cassar Sports Ground	1,000
Żebbuġ Rangers	7th	Żebbuġ	Żebbuġ Ground	1,000

== League table ==
Pos	Team	Pld	W	D	L	GF	GA	GD	Pts	Qualification or relegation
1	Marsa	22	15	5	2	54	21	+33	50	~~Promotion to the 2021–22 Maltese Premier League~~
2	Pembroke Athleta	22	13	8	1	41	18	+23	47	~~Promotion to the 2021–22 Maltese Premier League~~
3	San Ġwann	22	9	9	4	43	32	+11	36	
4	Żebbuġ Rangers	22	10	4	8	45	30	+15	34	
5	Swieqi United	22	10	4	8	41	30	+11	34	
6	Naxxar Lions	20	9	3	8	28	25	+3	30	
7	Qrendi	21	8	5	8	28	39	−11	29	
8	Pietà Hotspurs	21	8	3	10	35	35	0	27	
9	St. Andrews	22	8	3	11	29	33	−4	27	
10	Vittoriosa Stars	21	6	9	6	20	25	−5	27	
11	Marsaxlokk	19	6	8	5	25	13	+12	26	~~Relegation to the 2021-22 Maltese National Amateur League~~
12	Fgura United	21	7	5	9	26	35	−9	26	~~Relegation to the 2021-22 Maltese National Amateur League~~
13	Mqabba	21	6	6	9	19	29	−10	24	~~Relegation to the 2021-22 Maltese National Amateur League~~
14	St. George's	20	3	4	13	16	40	−24	13	~~Relegation to the 2021-22 Maltese National Amateur League~~
15	Qormi (R)	22	1	4	17	15	60	−45	2 (Note: Qormi received a 5 point deduction for breaching the League's Payment Regulations.)	Relegation to the 2021-22 Maltese National Amateur League

Updated to match(es) played on 7 March 2021. Source:
Rules for classification: 1) Points;
(R) Relegated

== Results ==
Home \ Away	FGU	MSA	MXK	MQA	NXL	PEM	PHS	QOR	QND	SGW	STA	STG	SWU	VST	ZEB
Fgura United	—	0–3	0–0	2–2	2–0	1–1		3–1	1–2		4–3			1–3	1–0
Marsa		—		1–0	4–1	1–1	2–0	5–0	4–1	3–0		2–2	2–0	0–1	1–0
Marsaxlokk	3–1	1–2	—	6–0	0–1	1–1		3–0	1–1					1–1	
Mqabba	1–2		0–1	—		0–2	2–1		1–1	1–3		1–0	1–1	0–0	0–0
Naxxar Lions		0–3		2–0	—	0–3		2–0	2–0	1–2	4–0	5–1	1–4		0–3
Pembroke Athleta	0–1	1–1	1–0	1–0		—	1–0	3–1	1–1	3–1			2–1		4–1
Pietà Hotspurs	2–2	4–1	1–0		2–1	3–3	—	2–3		4–3	2–3		0–3	2–1	0–1
Qormi		1–5		0–3	0–2	0–4	0–2	—	0–1	1–1	0–3	1–1	2–2		1–1
Qrendi	4–1		0–3	0–2		2–2	2–1		—	1–3	2–1	2–1	0–5		2–6
San Ġwann	3–0	4–4	0–0		0–0		0–0	5–2	3–2	—	1–1	3–0	1–0	4–1	
St. Andrews	0–3	1–4	1–1	4–0	0–0	1–2	0–1	1–0	0–1		—	3–1	2–0	2–0	1–4
St. George's	0–0	1–3	0–0	0–2		0–1	0–4			3–1	2–1	—	1–0	0–1	2–5
Swieqi United	3–1	0–1	1–0		0–2	1–3	5–4	4–0		3–3	1–0	2–1	—	2–2	
Vittoriosa Stars	1–0	2–2	0–2	1–1	0–0	1–1		1–0	1–1	1–1	0–1			—	2–1
Żebbuġ Rangers	3–0		2–2	1–2	1–4		2–0	6–2	0–2	1–1		3–0	1–3	3–0	—

Updated to match(es) played on 7 March 2021. Source: Malta Football Association
Legend: Blue = home team win; Yellow = draw; Red = away team win.
