= 2016–17 Maltese Futsal League =

Maltese Futsal League
- Season: 2016–17
- Country: Malta
- Champions: Luxol
- UEFA Futsal Cup: Luxol St. Andrews
- Biggest win: Valletta vs Qrendi 25–2 and Luxol St. Andrews vs Zurrieq 23–0
- Highest scoring: Valletta vs Qrendi 25–2
- Longest winning run: Luxol St. Andrews 13 games
- Longest unbeaten run: Valletta FC Futsal Club 14 games
- Longest winless run: Zurrieq 11 games
- Longest losing run: Zurrieq 11 games

The 2016–17 Maltese Futsal League, also known as the 2016–17 FMA Gatorade Futsal League for sponsorship reasons, is the 6th season of the Maltese Gatorade League, the top Maltese league for futsal clubs, since its establishment in 2011. It is also the 17th season of the futsal championship in Malta, since the beginning of organized futsal in the country in 1999. The competition was contested by 15 teams in two stages, followed by a play-off to decide the national champion. Luxol St. Andrews claimed the title after a 2–1 victory in the best-of-three series over Valletta in the final., earning a spot in the 2017–18 edition of UEFA Futsal Cup.

== Format ==
The 2016–17 Maltese Futsal Premier League was contested in three stages. In the first phase, the league consisted of fifteen participants, including five new teams, each playing against the others once in a single-round-robin format, totaling 14 games each. The top five teams qualified for the second stage, the Elite Round followed by a play-off to decide the national champion. The other ten teams took part in the First Division Round.

== Regular season ==
The first stage began in late November 2016, with Ħamrun Tre Angeli, Luxol St. Adrews, and Valletta identified by the media as the favourites for the title.

Standings
#	Team	PT	MP	W	D	L	GF	GA	+/-
1	Luxol St Andrews	39	14	13	0	1	176	14	+162
2	Valletta (−3)	37	14	13	1	0	173	36	+137
3	Ħamrun Tre Angeli	36	14	12	0	2	125	38	+87
4	Swieqi United Futsal	33	14	11	0	3	107	37	+70
5	University of Malta	25	14	8	1	5	60	62	−2
6	Sliema Wanderers	24	14	7	3	4	83	74	+9
7	Mriehel ESS	23	14	7	2	5	92	65	+27
8	Msida	22	14	7	1	6	89	59	+30
9	Safi San Lorenzo	18	14	6	0	8	53	81	−28
10	Qormi	16	14	5	1	8	56	101	−45
11	Qrendi	10	14	3	1	10	65	148	−83
12	Marsaskala	9	14	3	0	11	38	101	−63
13	Tarxien JMI	6	14	2	0	12	41	125	−84
14	Swieqi United U21	6	14	2	0	12	34	125	−91
15	Żurrieq	3	14	1	0	13	28	154	−126

=== Legend ===
- — Qualified for Elite Round
- — Qualified for First Division

== Elite round ==
Standings – Round
#	Team	PT	MP	W	D	L	GF	GA	+/-
1	Luxol St Andrews	49	18	16	1	1	197	20	+177
2	Ħamrun Tre Angeli	46	18	15	1	2	146	50	+96
3	Valletta (−3)	43	18	15	1	2	188	49	+139
4	Swieqi United Futsal	36	18	12	0	6	126	53	+73
5	University of Malta	25	18	8	1	9	65	96	−31

=== Legend ===
- — Qualified for Playoffs

== Championship Play-off ==
Luxol claimed the title after a 2–1 victory in the best-of-three series over Valletta in the final.

=== Semi-finals ===
Team 1	Agg.	Team 2	1st leg	2nd leg
Luxol	21–3	Swieqi United Futsal	10–1	11–2
Ħamrun Tre Angeli	6–14	Valletta	2–6	4–8

=== Final ===
Team 1	Score	Team 2
Valletta	2–5	Luxol
Valletta	7–6	Luxol
Valletta	5–7	Luxol
