= Maltese Futsal Super Cup =

- Founded: 2012; 13 years ago
- Region: Malta
- Teams: 2
- Current champions: Luxol
- Most championships: Luxol

The Maltese Futsal Super Cup (Maltese: Tazza tas-Nokawt tal-Futsal ta' Malta) is an annual cup competition for Maltese futsal teams. It is organised by the Futsal Malta Association, it is disputed by the winners of the League and the Cup. It is the fourth-highest national honour in futsal in Malta, after the Maltese Futsal League, the Maltese Futsal Knockout Cup, and FMA Futsal Challenger Cup.

The first Futsal Super Cup in Maltese was held in 2012 with Balzan emerging as the inaugural winners. In the first edition, on September 6, 2012, Lija Athletic was narrowly defeated - 5–4. They repeated the success the following season, this time under the name of FXDD Futsal Super Cup, against Hibernians.

The current holders are Luxol, following an 8–2 victory over the University of Malta Futsal in December 2024.

== Winners ==
Year	Winner	Score	Runner-up
2012	Balzan	5-4	Lija Athletic
2013	Balzan	5-1	Hibernians
2014	Balzan	3-1	Luxol
2015	Luxol	9-5 ET	Valletta
2016	Luxol	7–4	Valletta
2017	Luxol	9–3	Ħamrun Tre Angeli
2018	Valletta	13–1	University of Malta
2019	Valletta	7–3	Luxol
2020	not played due to COVID-19		
2021	not played due to COVID-19		
2022	Luxol	11–1	University of Malta
2023	Luxol	4–3	University of Malta
2024	Luxol	8–2	University of Malta
