= 2016–17 Maltese Futsal Knockout Cup =

2016–17 Maltese futsal competition

Tournament details
- Host country: Malta
- Dates: 7 September 2013 - 26 June 2014
- Teams: 14

Final positions
- Champions: Ħamrun Tre Angeli
- Runners-up: Valletta

2016–17 Maltese Futsal Knockout Cup was a futsal competition in Malta, organized in a single-elimination format. Fourteen teams entered the tournament, which began on 7 September 2016 and concluded with the final on 26 June 2017. Ħamrun Tre Angeli claimed the title after an 8–6 victory over Valletta in the final.

== Preliminary Round ==
Team 1	Score	Team 2
Luxol St. Andrews	9–4	Sliema Wanderers
Valletta	16–2	Tarxien Rainbows
Swieqi United	9–3	Żurrieq Wolves
Ħamrun Tre Angeli	9–1	Qormi
University of Malta	9–3	Mriehel ESS
Marsascala Construct Furniture	5–1	Swieqi United U21
Msida	6–2	Qrendi

== Quarter-Finals ==
Team 1	Score	Team 2
Luxol St. Andrews	10–0	University of Malta
Valletta	5–3	Swieqi United
Ħamrun Tre Angeli	6–5	Msida
Marsascala Construct Furniture	5–3	Safi San Lorenzo

== Semi-Finals ==
Team 1	Score	Team 2
Valletta	7–2	Luxol St. Andrews
Ħamrun Tre Angeli	10–3	Marsascala Construct Furniture

== Final ==
Team 1	Score	Team 2
Ħamrun Tre Angeli	8–6	Valletta

== External sources ==
- FutsalPlanet – Competitions overview
