= 2015–16 Maltese Futsal Knockout Cup =

2015–16 Maltese futsal competition

Tournament details
- Host country: Malta
- Dates: 10 October 2015 - 26 June 2016
- Teams: 14

Final positions
- Champions: Luxol
- Runners-up: Ħamrun Tre Angeli

2015–16 Maltese Futsal Knockout Cup was a futsal competition in Malta, organized in a single-elimination format. Fourteen teams entered the tournament, which began on 7 September 2015 and concluded with the final on 26 June 2016. Luxol claimed the title after a 7–3 victory over Ħamrun Tre Angeli in the final.

== First Round ==
Total twelve teams competed in the first round.

Team 1	Score	Team 2
Sliema Wanderers	5–9	Valletta
Mqabba	9–2	Gozo
Swieqi United Futsal	5–3	Marsaskala
Ħamrun Tre Angeli	13–3	Żebbuġ
Mdina	7–6	Qrendi
Lija	5–1	Msida

== Quarter-Finals ==
Team 1	Score	Team 2
Luxol	2–1	Valletta
Mqabba	8–2	Swieqi United Futsal
Lija	9–3	Mdina
Ħamrun Tre Angeli	7–2	Sirens

== Semi-Finals ==
Team 1	Score	Team 2
Luxol	3–0 w/o	Mqabba
Ħamrun Tre Angeli	4–2	Lija

== Final ==
Team 1	Score	Team 2
Ħamrun Tre Angeli	3–7	Luxol

== External sources ==
- FutsalPlanet – Competitions overview
- FutsalPlanet – Competitions and statistics
