= 2023–24 Maltese Futsal Knockout Cup =

Maltese Futsal Knockout Cup
- Season: 2023–24
- Country: Malta
- Champions: Luxol
- Runner up: ŻRQ Bormla
- Matches played: 7
- Biggest win: Luxol vs Maltese Under-18 selection 11–1
- Highest scoring: Luxol vs Maltese Under-18 selection 11–1
- Longest winning run: Luxol, 3 wins
- Longest unbeaten run: Luxol, 3 games

Luxol completed a domestic treble in the 2023–24 futsal season with a dominant 8–0 victory over ŻRQ Bormla in the final of the E&L Futsal Trophy. Having already secured the Super Cup and the Enemed Futsal League earlier in the season, Luxol capped off their campaign in emphatic fashion. They took control early, leading 4–0 at halftime, and added another four goals in the second half.

== Quarter-finals ==
Team 1	Score	Team 2
University of Malta	4–0	Birżebbuġa St. Peter's
Luxol	11–1	Maltese Under-18 selection
ŻRQ Bormla	4–2	Ta' Xbiex FC Futsal Izola Bank
Swieqi United}	8–1	Maltese Under-19 selection

== Semi-finals ==
Team 1	Score	Team 2
Luxol	3–1	Swieqi United
ŻRQ Bormla	6–1	University of Malta

== Final ==
Team 1	Score	Team 2
Luxol	8–0	ŻRQ Bormla

== External sources ==
- FutsalPlanet – Competitions overview
