= St George's Bormla Futsal =

Serbia Futsal Club

St George's Futsal
- Full name: St George's Bormla Futsal
- Nicknames: Saints, Bormliżi, Pioneers
- Founded: 2020; 6 years ago
- Dissolved: 2023; 3 years ago (merger with Żurrieq to form ZRQ Bormla)
- Ground: Corradino Pavilion, Paola, Malta
- Capacity: 1,000
- Chairman: none
- Manager: none
- League: none
- 2022-23: Maltese Futsal League, 6th

St George's Bormla Futsal Club was a Maltese futsal club founded in 2020 and dissolved three years later. The team was originating from the town of Bormla,a double-fortified harbour city in the Port Region of Malta. The futsal section of St. George's F.C., the oldest still-functioning football club in Malta, was known as one of the island's pioneer teams. Just before its dissolution in 2023, the Pioneers claimed the Enemed Challenger Cup title.

== History ==
The Saints won the Enemed Futsal Challenger League after defeating Żurrieq Futsal 6–2 in the final held at the NSS Pavilion in Pembroke, Malta on 31 March 2023. It was their last official match before the fusion with their rival in the final when they together established a new club - ŻRQ Bormla Futsal. The newly formed club lasted just one season before ceasing operation after the 2023-24.

== St. George's Women Futsal Team ==
In July 2025, St. George's Futsal announced the formation and official registration of a women's team for the 2025–26 Maltese Women's Futsal League season. This marks the club's return to competitive futsal after the men's team ceased operations after the 2022-23.

== Honours ==
- Enemed Challenger Cup: 1

Winner: 2022-23 Runners-up: 2021-22

== Notable players ==
- (Malta) (Serbia) Jovica Milijić
- (Malta) (Italy) Claudio Venuto
