= 2014–15 Maltese Futsal Premier League =

Maltese Futsal League
- Season: 2014–15
- Country: Malta
- Champions: Luxol (1st title)
- 2015–16 UEFA Futsal Cup: Luxol

The 2014–15 Maltese Futsal Premier League, for sponsorship reasons also known as Gatorade Futsal Premier League is the 4th season of the Maltese Futsal League, the top Maltese league for futsal clubs, since its establishment in 2011. It is also the 16th season of the futsal championship in Malta, since the beginning of organized futsal in the country in 1999.

== Sponsorship Deal ==
Just before the end of the season, in April, the Futsal Malta Association announced a three-year sponsorship agreement with Gatorade. The deal covered the Premier League, First Division League, as well as the Top Scorer and Best Player awards.

== Premier Division ==
The 2014–15 Maltese Futsal Premier Division was contested in two stages. In the first phase, the league consisted of nine participants, each playing against the others twice in a double-round-robin format, totaling 16 games each. The top four teams qualified for the playoff to determine the national champion. The final standing of the Premier League were as follows: Luxol 41, Ħamrun 40, Balzan 39, Valletta 27, Qormi 24, Swieqi United Futsal 20, Mosta 12, Gżira United 5, and Żebbuġ Rangers 2 points.

=== Awards ===
The Brazilian William da Silva Barbosa of Luxol was awarded as the top scorer of regular stage.

== Championship Play-Off ==
Champions Balzan and league leaders Luxol St. Andrews advanced to the final of the Gatorade Futsal Premier Division play-offs after defeating their respective opponents in the semi-finals. Balzan produced a notable comeback to overcome Ħamrun Spartans 7–4 after extra time, securing qualification with a 13–11 aggregate score. Luxol St Andrews achieved a more straightforward passage, defeating Valletta 9–1 to progress with a 15–5 aggregate score.

Tie	First Leg	Second Leg	Aggregate
Luxol vs Valletta	6–4	9–1	15–5
Ħamrun vs Balzan	7–6	4–7	11–13

Luxol were crowned as the Gatorade Futsal Premier Division champions after winning the play-off final against outgoing champions Balzan with an aggregate score of 8–6. The Saints won the first leg 4–3 and secured the title by repeating the same score in the second leg. After winning the title, Luxol will represent Malta in the 2015-16 UEFA Futsal Cup.

Tie	First Leg	Second Leg	Aggregate
Luxol vs Balzan	4–3	4–3	8–6
