= FMA Futsal Challenger Cup =

Minor futsal tournament

- Organiser(s): Malta Football Association
- Founded: 2020; 6 years ago
- Region: Malta
- Teams: 6
- Qualifier for: none
- Domestic cup: Maltese Futsal Knockout Cup
- Current champions: Ħamrun NCMB (1st title)
- Most championships: various
- Broadcaster(s): YouTube, Facebook
- 2024–25 Malta Challenger Cup 2024-25

The FMA Futsal Challenger Cup is an annual cup competition for Maltese futsal teams. It is organized by the Futsal Malta Association, it is disputed by the last placed team in the Maltese Premier Futsal League and the three best ranked clubs in the Challenger Futsal League. It is a minor cup competition in Malta, and a national honour behind Maltese Futsal League and Maltese Futsal Knockout Cup.

The current title holder is Ħamrun NCMB.

== History ==
=== Predecessor competitions ===
A new promotion and relegation system was introduced during the 2018–19 season. Following a one-round robin stage, the participating teams were split into two groups: the top six teams competed in the Elite League, while the bottom four were placed in the First Division. After the second stage, the bottom-placed team in the Elite League, Tarxien Rainbows, faced the winner of the First Division, Pietà Hotspurs, in what was then referred to as the Promotion Play-Off. The club from Tarxien won the match convincingly with a 4-0 victory. The winner of the play-off was placed in the Elite Futsal League for the following season, while the losing side competed in the Amateur Futsal League. The same system has been used to determine the winner of the Challenger Cup since 2020-21 season.

The 2019–20 season was interrupted by the COVID-19 pandemic. On 13 March 2020, the Executive Committee of the Malta Football Association suspended all futsal competitions, citing "the health, safety, and well-being of players, spectators, officials, and the general public as the overriding priority." On 29 April 2020, the Committee formally decided to terminate the futsal season. Decisions regarding the sporting outcomes of the competitions - such as the determination of winners, promotion and relegation, and play-offs—were deferred to be resolved at a later stage. Therefore, there was no officially declared winner of the Challenger cup this season, but based on sporting merits, MFA declared Luxol Team B as the winner of the Amateur Futsal League.

=== FMA Challenger Cup ===
The first edition of 'FMA Challenger Cup was held in the 2020-21 season. After a complicated cup system, the Amateur cup winner, Mellieħa defeated University of Malta 4-2.

Siġġiewi were crowned champions of the Enemed Challenger Cup for the 2021-22 season, after defeating St George's’s 3–2 in the final, held at the Pavilion of the National Sports School. Coached by Paul Bugeja, Siġġiewi had a remarkable debut season in Maltese futsal, securing the title in their first year of competition. The final was a closely contested and entertaining match. Justin Theuma scored twice for Siġġiewi, with Wallace Oliveira also finding the net, while Tiago Rodriguez and Luiz Lopez were on target for St George's.

== Champions ==
Year	Winner	Score	Runner-up
Promotion/Relegation Play-off
2019	Tarxien Rainbows	4-0	Pietà
Amateur League
2020	Luxol Team B	-	Swieqi Team B
FMA Challenger Cup
2021	Mellieħa	4-2	University of Malta
2022	Siġġiewi	3-2	St George's
2023	St George's	6-2	Żurrieq
2024	Tarxien Rainbows	6-5	Birżebbuġa St. Peter's
2025	Ħamrun NCMB	2-1	Marsaskala
