= Darko Ristić =

Serbian futsal player

Personal information
- Full name: Darko Ristić
- Date of birth: 22 August 1988 (age 38)
- Place of birth: Smederevo, Serbia, (Socialist Federal Republic of Yugoslavia) Yugoslavia
- Position: Forward

Team information
- Current team: Ekonomac

Senior career*
Years	Team	Apps	(Gls)
?	Smederevo	?	(?)
2016	Ekonomac	?	(?)
2019	Bintang Timur Surabaya	3	(1)
2023-24	ŻRQ Bormla	?	(?)

International career
?	Serbia	5	(1)
- * Club domestic league appearances and goals

Darko Ristić (Serbian Cyrillic: Дарко Ристић; born 22 August 1988), is a Serbian futsal player who started his career with Serbian club Smederevo and later played for Ekonomac. He also represented Serbia national futsal team at UEFA Futsal Euro 2016 in Serbia.

== ŻRQ Bormla ==
In August 2023, Ristić signed with Maltese club ŻRQ Bormla, becoming the team's first international acquisition. At Cospicua, he joined Serbian-born Maltese international Jovica Milijić, forming part of the club's growing foreign core. Throughout his career, Ristić played in futsal leagues in Serbia, Slovakia, Romania, Hungary, Indonesia and Thailand.

On 16 October 2023, Ristić scored twice in an 8–2 victory over Marsaskala, contributing significantly to ŻRQ Bormla's dominant performance.

== Career statistics ==
=== International ===
National team	Year	Apps	Goals
Serbia	2016	?	1
Total		5	1

==== International goals ====
As of 12 April 2016

No.	Date	Venue	Cap	Opponent	Score	Result	Competition	Ref
1	12 April 2016	Pavilhão Multiusos Odivelas, Odivelas, Portugal	?	Portugal	1–1	1–2	2016 FIFA Futsal World Cup qualification	

== Honours ==
Ekonomac

- Serbian Prva Futsal Liga (1): 2015–16

ŻRQ Bormla

- Maltese Futsal Knockout Cup runner up: 2023-24
