= 2015–16 Maltese Futsal Premier League =

Maltese Futsal League
- Season: 2015–16
- Country: Malta
- Champions: Valletta FC Futsal Club
- UEFA Futsal Cup: Valletta
- Matches played: 106 (91+15)
- Biggest win: Luxol 24–0 Gozo
- Highest scoring: Ħamrun Spartans 22–3 Qrendi
- Longest winning run: Luxol 12 games
- Longest unbeaten run: Luxol 12 games
- Longest winless run: Gozo 13 games
- Longest losing run: Gozo 12 games

The 2015–16 Maltese Futsal Premier League, also known as the 2015–16 FMA Gatorade Futsal League for sponsorship reasons, is the 5th season of the Maltese Gatorade League, the top Maltese league for futsal clubs, since its establishment in 2011. It is also the 17th season of the futsal championship in Malta, since the beginning of organized futsal in the country in 1999. Valletta claimed the title after a 2–1 victory in the best-of-three series over Ħamrun Spartans in the final.

== Format ==
The 2015–16 Maltese Futsal Premier Division was contested in two stages. In the first phase, the league consisted of fourteen participants, each playing against the others once in a single-round-robin format, totaling 13 games each. The top six teams qualified for the second stage.

== Regular season ==
Pos	Team	Pld	W	D	L	GF	GA	GD	Pts	Qualification
1	Luxol St Andrews	13	12	0	1	135	17	+118	36	Qualification for the Second Stage
2	Valletta	13	11	1	1	126	19	+107	34	Qualification for the Second Stage
3	ĦamrunSpartans	13	11	1	1	145	43	+102	34	Qualification for the Second Stage
4	Lija Athletic	13	10	1	2	95	26	+69	31	Qualification for the Second Stage
5	Swieqi United Futsal	13	7	2	4	64	50	+14	23	Qualification for the Second Stage
6	Msida	13	7	1	5	60	70	−10	22	Qualification for the Second Stage
7	Żebbuġ	13	6	0	7	55	87	−32	18	
8	Sirens	13	5	2	6	33	70	−37	17	
9	Sliema Wanderers	13	5	1	7	49	66	−17	16	
10	Mqabba	13	3	2	8	48	82	−34	11	
11	Mdina	13	3	0	10	36	95	−59	9	
12	Qrendi	13	2	1	10	57	114	−57	7	
13	Marsaskala	13	2	1	10	31	100	−69	7	
14	Gozo	13	0	1	12	13	108	−95	1	

Updated to match(es) played on unknown. Source:

== Second Stage ==
In the second phase, the league consisted of six participants, each playing against the others once in a single-round-robin format, totaling 5 games each. The top four teams qualified for the playoff to determine the national champion.

#	Team	Pts	Pld	W	D	L	GF	GA	GD
1	Hamrun Spartans FC	49	18	16	1	1	183	63	120
2	St. Andrews FC	48	18	16	0	2	166	30	136
3	Valletta FC Futsal	43	18	14	1	3	153	41	112
4	Lija Athletic FC	35	18	11	2	5	113	49	64
5	Swieqi United FC Futsal	27	18	8	3	7	82	81	1
6	Msida	22	18	7	1	10	75	108	-33

Legend:

- Qualified for play-offs

== Championship Play-off ==
Valletta claimed the title after a 2–1 victory in the best-of-three series over Ħamrun Spartans in the final.

=== Semi-finals ===
Team 1	Agg.	Team 2	1st leg	2nd leg
Luxol	6–12	Ħamrun Spartans	5–7	1–5
Ħamrun Spartans	7–9	Valletta	6–5	1–4

=== Final ===
The decisive third match was held behind closed doors due to a fine for the brawl after the second match.

Team 1	Score	Team 2
Valletta	6–6 (p 6–7)	Ħamrun Spartans
Ħamrun Spartans	6–7	Valletta
Valletta	10–4	Ħamrun Spartans
