= 2013–14 Maltese Futsal Premier League =

Maltese Futsal League
- Season: 2013–14
- Country: Malta
- Champions: Balzan (1st title)
- 2014–15 UEFA Futsal Cup: Balzan

The 2013–14 Maltese Futsal Premier League for sponsorship reasons known as FXDD Futsal Premier League, is the 3rd season of the Maltese Futsal League, the top Maltese league for futsal clubs, since its establishment in 2011. It is also 15th season of the futsal championship in Malta, since the beginning of organized futsal in the country in 1999.

== Sponsorship Deal ==
In December 2012, the Futsal Malta Association reached an agreement with FXDD Malta Ltd, a company specialising in online Forex trading, to sponsor the Futsal National League for two years.

== Premier Division ==
The Futsal Malta Association and affiliated clubs decided that the Maltese Futsal League Premier Division, previously known as the First Division, for the season will feature sixteen teams, while the First Division (second tier) will consist of thirteen teams. The teams competing in the Premier Division are: Pembroke Athleta, Żabbar St. Patrick, Mosta, Luqa St. Andrew's, Qormi, GZR Birżebbuġa, Vittoriosa Stars, San Ġwann, Ħamrun Spartans, Hibernians, Tarxien Rainbows, St. Andrews, Swieqi United Futsal, Melita, Balzan and Żurrieq.

== Championship Play-Off ==
The 2013–14 Maltese Futsal First Division playoffs culminated in a tightly contested final between Balzan and Hibernians. In the semi-finals, Balzan triumphed over St. Andrews with an aggregate score of 8–5, while Hibernians edged past San Ġwann with a 5–4 aggregate. In the final, Balzan secured the championship by defeating Balzan 17–15 on aggregate which brought them the participation in the 2014-15 UEFA Futsal Cup.

=== Semi-finals ===
Tie	First Leg	Second Leg	Aggregate
Hibernians vs San Gwann	3–4	2–0	5–4
St. Andrews vs Balzan	2–3	3–5	5–8

=== Final ===
Tie	First Leg	Second Leg	Aggregate
Balzan vs Hibernians	9–8	8–7	17–15
