= 2022–23 Maltese Futsal League =

Maltese Futsal League
- Season: 2022–23
- Country: Malta
- Champions: Luxol
- Relegated: none
- 2023–24 UEFA Futsal Champions League: Luxol
- Biggest win: Swieqi United FC Futsal vs. Malta FA Under-19 12–0
- Highest scoring: Ta' Xbiex FC Futsal Izola Bank vs. Marsaskala Futsal 13–5

The 2022–23 Maltese Futsal League, also known as Enemed Futsal League is the 14th season of the Maltese Futsal League, the top Maltese league for futsal clubs, since its establishment in 2011. It is also the 24th season of the futsal championship in Malta, since the beginning of organized futsal in the country in 1999.

== Format ==
The 2023–24 Maltese Futsal League was contested in two stages. In the first phase, the league consisted of ten participants, each playing one another once in a single round-robin format. Following this stage, the top five clubs advanced to the Premier League, where they again played a single round-robin (four matches each). The top four teams then entered the play-offs to determine the champions of the 2023–24 season.

=== New members ===
A notable development for the season was the introduction of a Malta Football Association development side composed of Under-19 players, formed as part of the preparation for the national youth team. The competition also saw the return of Swieqi United FC Futsal and Fgura United, while Veterans Malta Association entered the league for the first time, fielding a squad made up largely of experienced futsal players, including former internationals.

== First stage ==
Ten teams played a total of 9 matches to determine the second stage. The top five teams qualified for the Enemed Premier League while the rest played the Enemed Challenger League. Luxol St. Andrews FC Futsal finished at the top.

Standings — League Round FutsalPlanet — Competitions
Pos	Team	Pts	Pld	W	D	L	GF	GA	+/-
1	University of Malta Futsal ACJ Group	27	9	9	0	0	88	13	+75
2	Luxol St. Andrews FC Futsal	25	9	8	1	0	69	12	+57
3	ZRQ Bormla Futsal Club	25	10	8	1	1	66	23	+43
4	Swieqi United FC Futsal	21	10	7	0	3	65	24	+41
5	Birżebbuġa St. Peter's	18	10	6	0	4	49	35	+14
6	Marsaskala Futsal	13	10	4	1	5	62	56	+6
7	Ta' Xbiex FC Futsal Izola Bank	12	10	4	0	6	46	62	-16
8	Malta FA Under 19 Futsal	7	10	2	1	7	23	67	-44
9	Sliema Wanderers FC Futsal	5	10	1	2	7	21	85	-64
10	Malta FA Under 18 Futsal	3	10	1	0	9	27	65	-38
11	Gżira United Santa Margerita Futsal	3	10	1	0	9	20	94	-74

=== Legend ===
- — Qualified for Play-offs
- — Qualified for Challenger Cup

== Premier League ==
Five teams competed in a total of four matches to determine the participants for the play-offs.

STANDINGS – ENEMED FUTSAL PREMIER LEAGUE FutsalPlanet — Competitions
Pos	Team	Pts
1	Luxol St Andrews	36
2	Swieqi United	28
3	Ta’ Xbiex	25
4	University of Malta	24
5	Żurrieq Futsal	18

=== Legend ===
- — Qualified for Play-offs
- — Relegated to Challenger League

== Challenger League ==
Five teams play in a total of four matches to determine the participants for the Challenger Cup. St George's Bormla finished at the first place.

STANDINGS – ENEMED CHALLENGER LEAGUE
Pos	Team	Pts
1	St George’s	25
2	Marsaskala	18
3	Fgura United	18
4	Malta U19	6
5	Malta Veterans	0

=== Challenger Cup ===
==== Preliminary Round ====
Team 1	Score	Team 2
Fgura United	5–5, 9–10(P)	Malta FA Under-19
Veterans Malta Futsal	0–3	Marsaskala

==== Semi-finals ====
Team 1	Score	Team 2
Żurrieq Futsal	10–4	Malta FA Under-19
St George’s	10–3	Marsaskala

==== Final ====
Team 1	Score	Team 2
St George’s	6–2	Żurrieq Futsal

== Play-offs ==
=== Semi-finals ===
Team 1	Agg.	Team 2	1st leg	2nd leg
Luxol	15–1	University of Malta Futsal ACJ Group	6–1	9–0
Swieqi United	10–3	Ta’ Xbiex	5–2	5–1

=== Finals ===
Luxol were crowned Enemed Futsal Premier League champions for a fifth consecutive season after defeating Swieqi United 8–1 in the second match of the best-of-three final series at the National Sports School Pavilion. Having already won the first match 8–2, Luxol secured the title with this second victory. Despite missing suspended and injured players, including Emil Raducu, Luxol’s Mark Zammit, Everton Veve, and Maicon each scored twice.

Team 1	Score	Team 2
Luxol	8–2	Swieqi United
Luxol	8–1	Swieqi United
