= Mark Zammit =

Maltese futsal player

Personal information
- Full name: Mark Zammit
- Date of birth: 8 February 1986 (age 40)
- Place of birth: Malta
- Position: Forward

Team information
- Current team: Luxol

Senior career*
Years	Team	Apps	(Gls)
2010-2011	Deamons		
2010–2011	San Gwann		
2013–2014	Hibernians		
2014–2015	Balzan		
2015–	Luxol		

International career
	Malta (futsal)	65	
- * Club domestic league appearances and goals as of 23 August 2025

Mark Zammit (born 8 February 1986) is a Maltese futsal player who plays as forward, currently playing for Luxol of the Maltese Futsal League.

== Club career ==
In the 2010–11 season, Mark Zammit played for fourth-tier Demons and finished as the second-highest scorer of the Fourth Division with 24 goals.

In the 2012–13 season, Zammit played for the second-tier San Ġwann eventually winning the promotion to the Maltese Futsal League. The 2013–14 next season he signed for the Balzan immideatly taking a part in the UEFA Futsal Cup.

The following season, Zammit transferred to the current champion, Luxol, a part of the management's efforts to form a strong team for the 2014–15 UEFA Futsal Cup.

On 14 November 2023, champions Luxol defeated Gżira United Santa Margerita 12–1, Mark Zammit scored a hat-trick in the match, reaching a record of 200 goals for his club across nine seasons.

== National team ==
With 65 caps Zammit is Malta's most capped player of all time.
