= Qormi Futsal Club =

Sports club in Malta

Qormi
- Full name: Qormi FC Futsal Club
- Nickname(s): Sofor u Suwed (Yellow-Blacks); Tal Hobz (The Bakers); Tal-Panini; Yellows
- Founded: 2012; 13 years ago
- Ground: Corradino Pavilion, Paola, Malta
- Capacity: 1,000
- Chairman: unknown
- Coach: unknown
- League: Maltese Futsal League
- 2021-22: Maltese Futsal League, 10th
| Home colours | Away colours |

Qormi FC Futsal Club was a Maltese futsal club based in Qormi, Malta.

== History ==
Qormi FC‘s relationship with futsal goes back to before the formation of Futsal Malta Association in 2011.

After years of inactivity, Qormi was among 16 participants of the 2013-14 season. when they finished at 10th place recording 7 wins, 1 draw and 13 loses in 21 games. The following season, the club from Qormi went a step further, winning 5th place narrowly missing the Play-off.

In the 2021-22 season, Qormi FC Futsal finished the first round of the Enemed Futsal League at 10th place, above only to the last placed Marsaskala Legends which qualified them for the Challenger League. In the second stage, Qormi recorded all five defeats, even against the bottom placed Marsaskala (1-7). At the end of the season, Qormi had only 2 wins and 13 losses and the worst goal difference in the league, scoring only 35 and receiving 128 goals.

In the 2014-15 cup, Qormi advanced to the semi-finals after defeating Ħamrun Spartans 8–5 at the Corradino Pavilion. Ħamrun took an early 2–0 lead with goals from Rodrigo Patricio and Jovica Milijic, but Qormi quickly equalized through Blendi Gockaj and Basil Emeka Onuta. Endrit Kaca and Charlo Magro, who scored twice, extended Qormi’s advantage before halftime. Despite Ħamrun’s efforts in the second half, Qormi goalkeeper Gaetan Mallia made several crucial saves to secure the win. In the semi-final, Luxol was too strong opponent for the team from Qormi.

The following season, Qormi FC were among ten teams that took part in the Enemed Futsal League.

== Notable players ==
Gaetan Mallia
