= ZRQ Bormla Futsal =

ŻRQ Bormla Futsal
- Full name: Żurrieq Bormla Futsal Club
- Nicknames: Bormla, Bormliżi
- Founded: 2023; 3 years ago
- Dissolved: 2024; 2 years ago
- Ground: Paola Sports Complex
- League: Maltese Futsal League
- 2023-24: 3rd
Home colours

ŻRQ Bormla Futsal was a Maltese futsal club that competed in the top tier of Maltese futsal during the 2023–24 season. It represented the towns of Żurrieq and Bormla.

== Rapid rise and competitive spirit ==
ŻRQ Bormla Futsal was officially established in 2023 as an independent futsal club, unaffiliated with any existing sports organization. The club was formed through the fusion of two teams that had competed in the previous season: St George's and Żurrieq. The initiative was driven by individuals who had previously represented the communities of Bormla and Żurrieq through their respective teams in the prior season.

In their only season, ŻRQ Bormla competed in the Enemed Futsal Premier League. They secured a 4–3 victory over Swieqi United, overcoming a three-goal deficit to clinch the win. Karl Luke Schembri scored four goals in a 4–4 draw against defending champions Luxol, highlighting the team's resilience and attacking prowess.

== E & L Futsal Trophy finalists ==
ŻRQ Bormla reached the final of the E & L Futsal Trophy after defeating Ta’ Xbiex 4-2 in the quarterfinals and Swieqi United 6–1 in the semifinals. Jovica Milijić contributed two goals.

== Notable players ==
- Darko Ristić
- Jovica Milijić
