= Qrendi F.C. =

Maltese football club

Qrendi
- Full name: Qrendi Football Club
- Founded: 1955; 71 years ago
- Ground: Centenary Stadium, Ta' Qali, Malta
- Capacity: 3,000
- Chairman: Karmenu Farrugia
- Manager: Gotthard Conti
- League: Maltese National Amateur League
- 2022–23: Maltese Challenge League 14th (relegated)
Home colours	Away colours

Qrendi F.C. was founded in 1955. Through these years the club has competed in the Second and Third Division of the Malta Football Association. In season 2017–2018 they have played in Division 1 for the first time in the club's history.

From its inception it produced several players and officials who became known nationally. Dr. Joe Mifsud, who for many years occupied the post of President of Qrendi F.C., has also occupied the post of President of the Malta Football Association. He still lives in Qrendi. Mr. Carmelo Gauci (il-Busby), ex-kit manager of the National Team, has also for many years occupied a prominent role in the committee as a team manager. The player Joe (il-Faqi) Farrugia has also played for Sliema Wanderers and Marsa F.C., and, while in Australia, he played with Melita Eagles.

Aldrin Muscat is a Qrendi F.C. Youth product. He played in the Premier League with Zurrieq F.C. and Sliema Wanderers where in 1995/96 he won the Premier League with Sliema Wanderers, finishing top scorer with 18 goals. He also played with other teams like Gozo F.C., Qormi F.C., Msida F.C.

Another player to mention is Mr. Norman Darmanin Demajo (id-Dede) currently occupying the post of President at the Malta Football Association. Norman started playing football with Qrendi F.C. A talent who was immediately spotted by talent scouts of giants Valletta F.C. The following season he was transferred to Valletta F.C. for the sum of LM 700.00 (€1,630.00) which was considered a lot of money in the 1970s and 1980s.

The club experienced some financial problems in 1995, just a year after the team was promoted to Second Division with no losses and just a draw. However 11 years later in 2005/06, a new committee with 10 hardworking and dedicated members was founded. During that season Qrendi F.C. reached the play-offs but failed to be promoted losing all 3 matches. While in the next season 2006/07 Qrendi finished in fifth place just 2 points away from play-offs. In season 2014/5 Qrendi FC managed to secure promotion to Division 2 under coach Demis Paul Scerri. In season 2016/7, for the first time in the club's history, again under coach Demis Paul Scerri, Qrendi managed to secure a historic promotion to Division 1 placing 2nd. In season 2017/2018 Qrendi under the same coach managed to remain in Division 1 finishing 9th place.

In 2010, a 7-a-side synthetic football pitch was inaugurated thanks to UEFA and Malta Football Association, leading our club to start investing in Youth. Currently the Qrendi F.C. Youth Nursery has 50 Youth attending the Nursery. The age groups vary from Under 7 to Under 19.

== Futsal ==
Qrendi F.C. fielded a futsal team that competed in the Maltese Futsal League until 2017 finishing 11th in the First Stage. In the knockout competition they were defeated in the first round, just like in the previous edition. In the 2014–15 Maltese Futsal Knockout Cup Qrendi F.C. Futsal managed to advance to the Second round.

In February 2016, they were heavily defeated 2–22 in a league match against Valletta.

== Current squad ==
=== Players ===
Note: Flags indicate national team as defined under FIFA eligibility rules; some limited exceptions apply. Players may hold more than one non-FIFA nationality.

No.	Pos.	Nation	Player
1	GK	MLT	Christian Cassar
12	GK	MLT	Sven Mallia
24	GK	MLT	Krassimir Zammit
3	DF	MLT	Neil Spiteri
23	DF	MLT	Mikele Vella
17	DF	MLT	Kurt Theuma
18	DF	MLT	Miguel Cassar
77	DF	MLT	Gillmore Azzopardi
8	MF	MLT	Kieran Xuereb
21	MF	MLT	Ryan Spiteri
30	MF	MLT	Dylan Micallef
66	MF	MLT	Kyle Tanti
6	MF	MLT	Dion Ciantar
22	MF	MLT	Miguel Galea
97	MF	BRA	Gianfranco Micallef
33	MF	MLT	Brooklyn Sciberras
10	FW	NGA	Jojo Ogunnupe
7	FW	MLT	Andrey Attard
11	FW	MLT	Brandon Bray
5	FW	NGA	John Agunsoye
-	DF	MLT	Liam Balbi
-	MF	MLT	James Morrison
-	MF	MLT	Benjamin Grech
-	FW	MLT	Denzel Mula
