= 2023–24 Maltese Futsal League =

Maltese Futsal League
- Season: 2023–24
- Country: Malta
- Champions: Luxol
- Relegated: none
- 2024-25 UEFA Champions League: Luxol
- Biggest win: Marsaskala vs. Gżira 17–1

The 2023–24 Maltese Futsal League, also known as Enemed Futsal League is the 13th season of the Maltese Futsal League, the top Maltese league for futsal clubs, since its establishment in 2011. It is also the 25th season of the futsal championship in Malta, since the beginning of organized futsal in the country in 1999.

== Format ==
The 2023–24 Maltese Futsal League was contested in two stages. In the first phase, the league consisted of eleven participants, each playing one another once in a single round-robin format.

Following this stage, the top five clubs advanced to the Premier League, where they again played a single round-robin (four matches each). The top four teams then entered the play-offs to determine the champions of the 2023–24 season.

== First stage ==
Eleven teams played a total of 10 games to determine the second stage. The top-five teams qualified for the 2023–24 Enemed Premier Futsal League, while the rest of the teams qualified for the 2023–24 Enemed Challenger League.

2023–24 Enemed Futsal League – First Phase Standings
Pos	Team	Pts	Pld	W	D	L	GF	GA	+/-
1	University of Malta Futsal ACJ Group	30	10	10	0	0	90	14	+76
2	Luxol St. Andrews FC Futsal	25	10	8	1	1	70	13	+57
3	ŻRQ Bormla	25	10	8	1	1	66	23	+43
4	Swieqi United FC Futsal	21	10	7	0	3	65	24	+41
5	Birżebbuġa St. Peter's	18	10	6	0	4	49	35	+14
6	Marsaskala Futsal	13	10	4	1	5	62	56	+6
7	Ta' Xbiex FC Futsal Izola Bank	12	10	4	0	6	46	62	−16
8	Malta FA Under-19	7	10	2	1	7	23	67	−44
9	Sliema Wanderers FC Futsal	5	10	1	2	7	21	85	−64
10	Malta FA Under-18 Futsal	3	10	1	0	9	27	65	−38
11	Gżira United Santa Margerita	3	10	1	0	9	20	94	−74

=== Legend ===
- — Qualified for Play-offs
- — Qualified for Challenger Cup

== Premier League ==
2023–24 Enemed Futsal League – Premier League Standings
Pos	Team	Pts
1	University of Malta ACJ Group	39
2	Luxol St Andrews	37
3	ŻRQ Bormla	28
4	Swieqi United	27
5	Birżebbuġa St. Peter's	18

=== Legend ===
- — Qualified for Play-offs
- — Qualified for Challenger Cup

== Challenger League ==
Standings
#	Team	PT
1	Ta' Xbiex FC Futsal Izola Bank	27
2	Marsaskala	25
3	Malta FA Under-19	13
4	Gżira	9
5	Sliema Wanderers FC Futsal	8
6	Malta FA Under-18 Futsal	6

=== Challenger Cup ===
==== Preliminary round ====
Team 1	Score	Team 2
Malta FA Under-19	4–2	Gżira
Marsaskala	7–5	Sliema Wanderers FC Futsal

==== Semi-finals ====
Team 1	Score	Team 2
Birżebbuġa St. Peter's	5–3	Malta FA Under-19
Ta' Xbiex FC Futsal Izola Bank	5–7	Marsaskala

==== Final ====
Team 1	Score	Team 2
Ta' Xbiex FC Futsal Izola Bank	6–5	Marsaskala

== Championship Play-off ==
=== Semi-finals ===
Team 1	Agg.	Team 2	1st leg	2nd leg
Luxol	18–8	ŻRQ Bormla	9–6	9–2
University of Malta Futsal ACJ Group	12–6	Swieqi United	2–1	10–5

=== Final ===
Luxol St. Anderws retained the Enemed Futsal League title in the 2023–24 season, defeating University of Malta Futsal ACJ Group in the final series. After winning the first leg 4–1, Luxol secured the championship by overcoming UOM 4–3 after extra time in the second leg, claiming their sixth consecutive national title.

Team 1	Score	Team 2
Luxol	4–1	University of Malta Futsal ACJ Group
Luxol	4–3 ET	University of Malta Futsal ACJ Group
