= Vittoriosa Stars F.C. =

Maltese football club

Vittoriosa Stars
- Full name: Vittoriosa Stars Football Club
- Nickname(s): The Reds, The Stars
- Founded: 1906; 119 years ago
- Ground: De La Salle Ground, Vittoriosa, Malta
- Chairman: Erskine Vella
- Manager: Dennis Apap
- League: Maltese Challenge League
- 2024–25: Maltese National Amateur League, 1st of 16 (promoted)
Home colours

Vittoriosa Stars Football Club are a Maltese football club from the seaside town of Birgu, which currently plays in the Maltese Challenge League. They were founded in 1906.

== History ==
Vittoriosa were promoted to the Maltese Premier League in 2009, but were excluded before the start of the season as a result of a match-fixing scandal. In 2010, they defeated San Gwann 1–0 in a promotion playoff to gain promotion to the top division for the second consecutive season. They were relegated the following year, leading to the departure of their coach Winston Muscat.

Vittoriosa were denied the First Division championship in 2013 after losing their final round match 4–1 to Pietà Hotspurs F.C. meant they were tied on points with Naxxar Lions. They lost the championship decider 2–1 to Naxxar Lions, but still clinched another promotion to the top flight. They were relegated from the 2013–14 Maltese Premier League on the final day of the season, again losing to Naxxar Lions by a score of 3–1, which allowed the Lions to jump them in the table.

Olivier Spiteri was manager from 2012 to 2014.

Vittoriosa played the remainder of the decade in the first division, maintaining their second-tier status in 2019 after winning a relegation playoff against Mgarr United F.C.

== Futsal ==
Vittoriosa Stars F.C. had a futsal team that competed in the Maltese Futsal League until 2014. That season, Vittoriosa Stars FC Futsal reached the final of the cup. They suffered a heavy 2–9 defeat against Balzan in the final.

== Current squad ==
Note: Flags indicate national team as defined under FIFA eligibility rules; some limited exceptions apply. Players may hold more than one non-FIFA nationality.

No.	Pos.	Nation	Player

== Personnel ==
=== Coaching staff ===
Coach	(Malta) Ramon Zammit
Assistant coach	(Malta) Jason Bartolo
Goalkeeping coach	(Serbia) Ivan Milosevic
Team manager	(Malta) Jonathan Vella
