= Fgura United F.C. =

Maltese football club

Fgura United
- Full name: Fgura United Football Club
- Founded: 1 June 1971; 54 years ago
- Ground: Fgura United Football Complex
- Chairman: Larkin Bonnici
- Manager: Kevin Vella
- League: Maltese Challenge League
- 2023–24: Maltese Challenge League, 8th
- Website: http://www.fguraunitedfc.com/
Home colours	Away colours

Fgura United Football Club, commonly known as Fgura United is a Maltese football club based in Fgura, Malta. The club currently plays in the Maltese First Division.

Fgura United was founded on June 1, 1971, and is the oldest sport organisation in the locality of Fgura, Malta.

== History ==
=== Early years (1971–1974) ===
Fgura United was founded on June 1, 1971, and is the oldest sport organisation in the locality of Fgura, Malta. The first president was Mr. Zaren Vella, with Mr. C Farrugia as the secretary and Mr. E Muscat as the treasurer. During the club's early years, the premises changed twice from St Thomas Street in 1973, then to Triq L-Isponsun and then back to St Thomas Street in new premises that the club has invested in. Between the 1971–72 and 1973–74 seasons the club participated in the MFA Amateur League and the MFA Minor League.

=== Domestic Competition(1975–2011) ===
Fgura United entered the National League in 1974–75 season when the club participated in the MFA 4th Division. Fgura United has been participating in all MFA tournaments including the National, Reserves, Under 21 and Under 19 competitions continuously ever since. Since 1995, Fgura United has run a youth nursery which aims to train young footballers aged 6–16 to develop their talents and enable them to participate in Maltese youth competitions including the Under 12, Under 15 & Under 17.

=== New Era (2012–present) ===
In 2012 the club finally has suitable training facilities and a club house. The project included the football ground and a five-a-side pitch – both with artificial turf and a club house including a hall, offices for administration, a bar and five dressing rooms which were funded mainly through the UEFA Hat-Trick Programme, the Malta Football Association, Kunsill Malti għall-iSport, the Good Causes Fund and the club itself who thanks to the sound administration throughout the years was able to inject the funds obtained for the sale of property into the new complex which was built over the past months. opened their new artificial turf ground to replace the old one. Michel Platini was present at the opening of the pitch. The pitch is now Fgura's training ground. In Season 2013–14 Fgura United achieved the biggest success in club's history by winning promotion to Maltese First Division. Another milestone was made during the following season which they were a debut team in the first division and manage to make 15 games unbeaten which secure their status in the first division which was the main target for the club. In their debut season in Maltese First Division team has done more than expected by winning high 5th place at the end of the season.

== Club facilities ==
In 2012 the club finally got suitable training facilities and a club house. The project included the football ground and a five-a-side pitch – both with artificial turf and a club house including a hall, offices for administration, a bar and five dressing rooms. The facilities were inaugurated by UEFA president Michel Platini. Thanks to the quality of this facility, except of senior team, the complex is also used by Fgura United youth teams, but also by some of the most prominent football clubs in Malta. For the future is planned construction of another five-a-side pitch, tennis courts, gym, apartments for the players and a small park which will be within this complex as well.

== League and cup history ==
Season		Pos.	Pl.	W	D	L	GS	GA	P
2014–15	1. Division	5	26	11	10	5	32	27	43
2015–16	1. Division	10	26	8	6	12	24	35	30

== Futsal ==
Fgura United F.C. also had a futsal team, which participated in Malta's top futsal league until 2023. The 2022–23 season was the last edition of the Enemed Futsal League in which Fgura Utd FC Futsal participated, finishing at 8th place and thus qualified for the Enemed Challenger League. In the Challenger League, Fgura earned 4th place, then lost to Malta U-19 Team in the quarter-final.

== Honours and achievements ==
=== Domestic ===
- Maltese Second Division
  - Promotion (1) 2013–2014
- Maltese Third Division
  - Promotion (2) 1987–1988, 2011–2012

== Kit manufacturers and shirt sponsors ==
Period	Kit Manufacturer	Shirt Sponsor	
2013–2014	adidas	Decantae	
2014–2015	adidas	Chain Supermarket	
2015–2016	adidas	Chain Supermarket	James Caterers
2016–2017	adidas	eurobridge	Twilight

== Current squad ==
As of 1 March 2026

Note: Flags indicate national team as defined under FIFA eligibility rules; some limited exceptions apply. Players may hold more than one non-FIFA nationality.

No.	Pos.	Nation	Player
1	GK	MLT	Ryan Vella
3	DF	MLT	Lee Pisani
4	DF	MLT	Haytham Abdelghani
5	DF	MLT	Andrew Xuereb
7	MF	MLT	Dylan Caruana
8	MF	MLT	Samuel Buhagiar
9	FW	NGA	Abdulbasit Shittu
10	FW	MLT	Alan Abdel Rahman
11	FW	COL	Sergio Mosquera
13	DF	MLT	Gabriel Mangion
16	FW	MLT	Timilehin Caleb Akande

No.	Pos.	Nation	Player
17	FW	MLT	Kayne Haber
19	DF	MLT	Owen Mifsud
21	FW	MLT	Karl Formosa
22	MF	MLT	Matteo Gambin
24	GK	MLT	Gerson Mifsud
27	GK	MLT	Rudi Briffa
30	FW	GHA	Kwabena Aikins
33	DF	LBR	Adolphus Nagbe Marshall
45	MF	MLT	Miguel Tabone (on loan from Ħamrun Spartans)
77	FW	JPN	Hidesato Ueda
88	MF	MLT	Svain Abela

== Coaching staff ==
Position	Name
Head coach	(Malta) Kevin Vella
Assistant coach	(Malta) Daniel de Abela-Borg
Goalkeepers coach	(Malta) Sinclair Douglas
Nursery Head coach	(Malta) Claude Chetcuti

== Club officials ==
Position	Name
President	(Malta) Larkin Bonnici
Vice-President	(Malta) Lawrence Bugeja, Brian Calvagna
General Secretary	(Malta) Stefan Vella
Team manager	(Malta) Anthony Gafa'
Treasurer	(Malta) Alvin Abdilla
Kit manager	(Malta) Brian Calavagna, Mauro Bianco
