= Gabriel Dobre =

Romanian futsal player

Personal information
- Full name: Gabriel Dobre
- Date of birth: 14 April 1980 (age 46)
- Place of birth: Romania
- Position: Cierre

Team information
- Current team: Győri ETO

International career
Years	Team	Apps	(Gls)
- Romania

Gabriel Dobre (born 14 April 1980), is a Romanian futsal player who plays for Győri ETO and the Romanian national futsal team.
