= William Barbosa (footballer, born 1978) =

Brazilian footballer

Personal information
- Full name: William da Silva Barbosa
- Date of birth: 2 June 1978 (age 48)
- Place of birth: São Paulo, Brazil
- Height: 1.88 m (6 ft 2 in)
- Positions: Midfielder; forward

Senior career*
Years	Team	Apps	(Gls)
2001	Santa Catarina		
2001–2002	Como	0	(0)
2001–2002	→ Bellinzona (loan)	13	(7)
2002	Carrarese	13	(5)
2002–2003	→ L'Aquila (loan)	24	(3)
2003–2006	Martina	95	(42)
2006–2008	Verona	53	(8)
2008–2009	Portogruaro	16	(1)
2009	Taranto	14	(4)
2009–2010	Brindisi	29	(14)
2010–2011	Casarano	29	(6)
2011–2013	Valletta	54	(16)
2013–2014	St. Andrews	0	(0)
2013–2015	Luxol Futsal		
2015	Birkirkara Futsal		

Managerial career
- 2013–2014: St. Andrews (player-manager)
- * Club domestic league appearances and goals

William da Silva Barbosa (born 2 June 1978), known as William or William Barbosa, is a Brazilian former footballer.

== Biography ==
Born in São Paulo, Brazil, William started his professional career in Brazil.

=== Como ===
William moved to Europe for Italian Serie B side Como. That season non-EU quota of Italy was abolished and Como signed William, Douglas Pinto de Castro and Marcelo Luis Alcantara from Santa Catarina. They followed the footsteps of Amauri, leaving for Swiss Nationalliga B club Bellinzona in a one-year loan. The team was located in Ticino, the Italian speaking region, bordering Lombardy where Como is located. In the mid-season William returned to Italy. He immediately joined Serie C1 club Carrarese in co-ownership deal. In June 2002 Como bought back William. In July 2002 he left for another third division club L'Aquila on loan.

=== Martina ===
After Enrico Preziosi bought Genoa and transferred numbers of players from Como to Genoa in un-economical price (which Preziosi was banned from football for Daniele Gregori, Carlo Gervasoni and Saša Bjelanović's transfer in 2007), the team was lack of financial source (no more re-capitalization) and was in the market, William, who had a low goal scoring record in Italy at that time, was offloaded to Apulia club Martina, his third club in Italian third division. He scored 42 goals in 3 seasons, about 0.44 goals per game.

=== Verona ===
William signed a pre-contract with Serie B side Hellas Verona F.C. in January 2006. In June he formally signed by the Veneto club as a free agent. The team relegated at the end of season. The club also sold forward Julien Rantier to raise fund and cut cost. That season William made 22 starts in the second division, scored four times. He followed the team to play third division football, however he again only scored four times. In June 2008 he mutually agreed to terminate the contract with club.

=== Lega Pro and Serie D ===
In July he left for another Veneto club Calcio Portogruaro Summaga, his fifth club in the third division. He only scored once in the group A. In January 2009 he moved back to Apulia, southern Italy for the third division group B side Taranto, in 3-year contract (2 1/2-year?).

On 31 August 2009 he left for Lega Pro Seconda Divisione club Brindisi, also in Apulia region. He scored a double figure again with nearly 0.48 goals per game.

In August 2010 he left for another Apulia team, but for fifth division club Casarano, aged 32. However he only scored 6 times. The team losing the first round of promotion playoffs, failed to promote back to professional league.

=== Malta ===
In June 2011 he left for Maltese Premier League club Valletta. He scored 2 goals in 4 appearances in 2011–12 UEFA Champions League qualifying rounds, losing to FK Ekranas.He signed a contract extension to the local champions Valletta FC, And William ending winning best midfielder, best foreigner, Best overall and was named in the BOV premier league Best XI.

==== Futsal ====
Da Silva played two seasons for Luxol, winning the title in 2015. That season he was the Maltese Futsal League top scorer and at the same time he played for a Gozitan association football team St Lawrence Spurs in Gozo Football League.
