= University of Malta Students' Futsal Team =

UM Futsal
- Full name: University of Malta Students' Futsal Team
- Nicknames: Knights, Universitarians, Students
- Founded: June 12, 2014
- Ground: St. Martin's College, Msida, Malta
- Capacity: 200
- Manager: Clayton Felice
- League: Maltese Futsal League
- 2017–18: Maltese Futsal League, 6th and Division One Semi Finalists
| Home colours | Away colours |

The University of Malta Students' Futsal Team, known as the University Futsal Team for short, is a futsal team that competes in the Maltese Futsal League. The team previously bore the name of its parent club, Mdina Knights F.C. In 2018, the team won its first silverware in the Maltese Futsal Knockout Cup.

== History ==
=== Season 2014–15 ===
In 2014, after a multi-year hiatus, the futsal section of the Mdina Knights began to play again. The move was prompted by officials from Kunsill Studenti Universitarji and Malta University Sports Club officials, who suggested the football club recruit University of Malta students to play on the team. On September 15, 2014, the team played their first match against Mqabba, a match which ended in a three-to-three tie. The team ultimately finished their first season mid-table, surpassing the team's own expectations. Their wins included a victory over Luqa, a ten-to-zero shutout of Birzebbuga, and an upset against the then league leader, Mellieha. The team was the last opponent of Lija Futsal, who won the division title. In their match against Birzebbuga, vice-captain Cleaven Portelli registered the fastest goal of the season, scoring 13 seconds after the match's start.

=== Season 2015–16 ===
After a positive inaugural season, the team sought a number of corporate partners. The team added Gaetano Gesualdi and other new players to their roster. The team strengthened its structures together with a healthy financial position, including charity for academic research towards Motor neuron diseases as part of its social responsibility, but found it difficult to adapt to the format change in the Maltese Futsal League. Although the team started positively, it finished in the eleventh place out of 14 teams. The Students were defeated by Swieqi United Futsal, Hamrun Futsal, and Luxol St Andrews Futsal Club, and were narrowly defeated by Sirens, Mqabba, and Zebbug. The team recovered toward the end of the season and won against Marsascala, Gozo, and Qrendi.

=== Season 2016–17 ===
The team grew and because Futsal Malta Association regulations allowed teams to compete independently from any club within the Maltese football league system, Mdina Knights F.C. and the Student section ceased collaboration in 2016. The University of Malta Students' Futsal Team became an independent organisation and was recognised as an official student organisation by the senate of the University of Malta.

The team crowd funded its away kit, which would include the names of all those who contributed, in 2016.

In 2016–17, the team saw unprecedented successful performances, including crushing victories against "Swieqi U-21", "Żurrieq Wolves", "Safi San Lorenzo", "Qrendi F.C.", and "Swieqi FC", but losing the match against Hamrun, and won important matches, for example, against Msida Futsal. The team entered the race for the Elite Group of the Gatorade Futsal League. With a draw against Sliema Futsal, the team achieved Elite status for the first time.

=== Season 2017–18 ===
In the 2017–18 season, the team aimed to enter the Elite Round once again and was considered on par with the strongest clubs. (Note: Attributed to multiple sources:) However the club did not make it to the top round of Maltese futsal. The club also failed to win the Division One play-offs. Having finished first in the Division One pool, the team played a semi-final against Tarxien JMI and exited on penalties after a draw. In the Maltese Futsal Knockout Cup, the club managed to defeat Valletta FC Futsal Club in the quarter finals to arrive at the finals. The club defeated Luxol St Andrews Futsal Club with a five-to-two score and claimed its first trophy in Maltese domestic futsal. The team later presented the trophy to the rector of the University of Malta.

=== Season 2018–19 ===
The team saw major changes in the squad—the departure of several key players, including Shawn Deguara to Valletta FC Futsal Club, and the departure of Kyle Sultana as coach. Former player Djordje Maksimović was appointed as the new coach.

The University Futsal Team confirmed its participation in the 2018–19 Maltese Futsal League.

Having won the Knockout Cup in the previous season, the club became eligible to contest the Maltese Futsal Super Cup. The University Team was defeated by Valletta FC Futsal by thirteen-to-one which made them the runners-up of the Super Cup.

The club appointed Clayton Felice as new coach. The team opened its league commitments on October 5 against UM Futsal Academy, its own academy team, and won nine-to-one. Three days later, on October 8, Luxol won against the senior University side eight-to-one. Birkirkara gained their first three points against University on October 17, winning seven-to-four.

New player Lee Grech proved a revelation and was called up to the Malta national futsal team. Grech scored the only goal for Malta on his debut on October 25, 2018, but the team lost two-to-one to the Northern Ireland national futsal team.

== Kit evolution ==
| 2014–2015 first (Mdina Knights) | 2014–2015 second (Mdina Knights) | 2014–2015 third (MUSC) | 2014–2015 goalkeeper |
| 2015–2016 home | 2015–2016 alternate | 2015–2016 away | 2015–2016 goalkeeper | 2015–2016 goalkeeper |
| 2016–2017, 2017–2018 home | 2016–2017, 2017–2018 away (Crowdfunded) | 2016–2017, 2017–2018 goalkeeper |
| 2018–2019 home | 2018–2019 (Crowdfunded) | 2018–2019 goalkeeper home | 2018–2019 goalkeeper away |

== Current squad 2019–20 ==
| Number | Player | Pos. | Nat. |
| 1 | Ivan Jovanović | Pivot | (Serbia) |
| 4 | Neil Cauchi | Winger | (Malta) |
| 5 | Dani Borg | Sweeper | (Malta) |
| 7 | Karl Sciortino | Winger | (Malta) |
| 8 | Melvin Borg | Sweeper | (Malta) |
| 9 | Cleaven Portelli | Winger | (Malta) |
| 10 | Aidan Caruana | Winger | (Malta) |
| 11 | Dylan Musù | Winger | (Malta) |
| 13 | Jonathan Martinelli | Goalkeeper | (Malta) |
| 14 | Ervin Rigo | Winger | (Serbia) |
| 15 | Cedric Sciberras | Winger | (Malta) |
| 19 | Neil Cuschieri | Goalkeeper | (Malta) |
| 20 | Dylan Cacciattolo | Winger | (Malta) |
| 23 | Christian Wismayer | Winger | (Malta) |
| 29 | Denis Di Maio | Pivot | (Italy) |
| 70 | Gabriel Buckson | Winger | (Switzerland) |
| 91 | Luke Galea | Winger | (Malta) |

=== Captaincy ===
1. Neil Cauchi
2. Melvin Borg

== Technical staff ==
- Head Coach: MLT Clayton Felice
- Goalkeeping coach: ESP Alejandro García Melero
- Physical coach: (Malta) David Spiteri
- Team manager: (Malta) Jurgen D'Amato

== Committee ==
- Chief executive officer: Nicholas Martinelli
- Chief in external and internal affairs: Jasmine Agius
- Chief operations officer: Kurt Rizzo
- Chief of administration: Nicole Agius
- Chief financial officer: Ylenia Bugeja
- Chief of events, planning and logistics: Calvin Scicluna
- Chief of public relations and media: Kurt Aquilina
- Chief of business development and marketing: Steph Dalli

=== Honorary titles ===
Honorary presidents:

- Gilli Amato Gauci
- Warren Sammut
- Stefan Cutajar

Club ambassador:

- Kyle Sultana

== Former players ==
- (Georgia (country)) Vazha Gvaramia
- (Serbia) Djordje Maksimović
- (Spain) Alejandro Rubia
- (France) Mamadou Diaby
- (Slovenia) Nermin Hasanbegović
- (Spain) José María Aguilera Castellano
- (Serbia) Dušan Rakić
- (Italy) Daniele Degennaro
- (Italy) Davide Iannacco
- (Brazil) Vanderlei Reis Augusto
- (Serbia) Ervin Rigo
- (Serbia) Ivan Jovanović
- (Malta) Dalziel Bugeja
- (Malta) Rodney Debono
- (Malta) John Micallef
- (Malta) Roberto Sarcia
- (Malta) Jean Carl Cuschieri
- (Malta) Shawn Deguara
- (Malta) Andrew Camilleri
- (Malta) Daniel Camilleri
- (Malta) Matthew Gatt
- (Malta) Kurt Drakard
- (Malta) Ryan Micallef
- (Malta) Nathanael Borg
- (Malta) Ranald Portelli
- (Malta) Jonathan Falzon
- (Malta) Randall Vella
- (Malta) Gaetano Gesualdi
- (Malta) Paul Scerri
- (Malta) Martin Attard

== Academy ==
In the 2017–18 season, the club set up a second team called Junior College Futsal which referred to the sixth form operated by the University of Malta.

Junior College Futsal was renamed University of Malta Students' Futsal Academy in the 2018–19 season; their name was stylised as UM Futsal Academy. The team signed an agreement with the mother team that the academy will operate in line with the club's global vision.

== Honours ==
- Maltese Futsal Knockout Cup: Winners 2017–18
- Maltese Futsal Super Cup: Runners-up 2018–19
