= Mqabba F.C. =

Maltese football club

Mqabba
- Full name: Mqabba Football Club
- Nicknames: Tal-Gebel; Hajduks
- Founded: 1957; 69 years ago (As Mqabba Ħajduks)
- Ground: Various due to the fact they own no true ground
- Capacity: Anywhere between ~1,000 to ~18,000 depending on what ground is used
- Chairman: Mario Borg
- Manager: Vincent Carbonaro
- League: National League I
- 2025-26: Maltese National Amateur League I 5th
- Website: http://www.mqabbafc.com

Mqabba F.C., commonly referred to simply as Mqabba, is a Maltese football clubbased in Mqabba, a small village in south-western Malta. They were founded in 1957, and currently play in the third tier of Malta, the National League.

== History ==
During the First World War, some Maltese soldiers brought football to the village but only after the Second World War a club was first established. Mqabba Ramblers played their first game in 1953 and they joined the Maltese Amateur FA in 1955. At the end of the 1950s, two clubs from Mqabba, Mqabba Rovers and Mqabba Ħajduks played in the Maltese amateur league and they decided to merge and take the name of the latter.

=== Mqabba Ħajduks ===
The merger club played its first game in 1958 and four years later they were allowed to the Maltese Third Division by the Malta Football Association. In 1978 they clinched promotion to the Second Division for the first time but they were relegated again in the year after that. In 1982 Ħajduks won promotion again and in 1984 they reached the Maltese First Division for the first time in their history. They even went one better when they made their debut in the Maltese Premier League in 1985, but they only amassed a meagre 6 points to end up bottom of the table.

Following the re-organisation of the Maltese football leagues and the creation of the Premier League, they gained promotion to this division in 1990–1991, 1992–1993 and 2006–2007. Mqabba F.C. has the merit of being one of the smallest Maltese localities to feature in the highest level of Maltese football.

== Futsal ==
Mqabba F.C. also had a futsal team, which participated in Malta's top futsal league for the last time in the 2015–16 Maltese Futsal Premier League, Mqabba finished 10th out 14 teams in the Regular stage, earning 10 points in 13 matches. In the Second stage, Mqabba lost 3–5 to Sliema Wanderers in the Gatorade First Division play-off semi-final.

In the Gatorade Knockout Cup, Mqabba reached the semi-finals, but didn't turned up so Luxol were awarded a walk-over to the final. Previously, Mqabba defeated Gozo 9–2 in the first round, then Swieqi United Futsal 8–2 in the quarter-final.

== Current squad ==
As of 29 July 2022

Note: Flags indicate national team as defined under FIFA eligibility rules; some limited exceptions apply. Players may hold more than one non-FIFA nationality.

No.	Pos.	Nation	Player
—	GK	MLT	Craig Abdilla
—	GK	MLT	Jordan Agius
—	GK	MLT	Darshton Grech
—	DF	MLT	Jeremy Azzopardi
—	DF	MLT	Jeremy Busuttil
—	DF	MLT	Arsene Rye Cilia Mumford
—	DF	MLT	Neil Falzon
—	DF	MLT	Leonard Farrugia
—	DF	ARG	Gabriel Mannino
—	DF	MLT	Luke Musu
—	DF	ITA	Thomas Veronese
—	MF	MLT	Kurt Agius

No.	Pos.	Nation	Player
—	MF	MLT	Lee Agius
—	MF	MLT	Joseph Attard
—	MF	MLT	Karl Ghigo
—	MF	MLT	Omar Khatib
—	MF	MLT	Brooklyn Sciberras
—	MF	MLT	Jacques Vella Critien
—	MF	MLT	Ian Caruana
—	MF	MLT	Christophe Cutajar
—	MF	BRA	Ronald Melo
—	MF	SRB	Luka Mijić
—	MF	MLT	Ryan Spiteri
