= Żebbuġ Rangers F.C. =

Maltese football club

Żebbuġ Rangers
- Full name: Żebbuġ Rangers Football Club
- Founded: 1943; 83 years ago
- Ground: Żebbuġ Ground
- Capacity: 1,000
- Chairman: Joseph Pace
- Manager: Rodney Bugeja
- League: Maltese Challenge League
- 2025–26: 14th
Home colours	Away colours

Żebbuġ Rangers Football Club is a semi-professional football club from the town of Żebbuġ in Malta. The club currently competes in the Maltese Challenge League. In the 2022 they won the Maltese Challenge League after a win against Pembroke Athleta.

== Futsal ==
Żebbuġ Rangers F.C. had a futsal team that last competed in the Maltese Futsal League in the 2015–16 season, finishing in 7th place, narrowly missing the Second stage spot. In the previous season, the team from Żebbuġ finished in last place with only 2 points.

== Players ==
=== Current squad ===
As of 1 March 2026

Note: Flags indicate national team as defined under FIFA eligibility rules; some limited exceptions apply. Players may hold more than one non-FIFA nationality.

No.	Pos.	Nation	Player
1	GK	MLT	Jake Scicluna
2	DF	MLT	Jake Attard
3	MF	MLT	Glen Mifsud
4	DF	MLT	Leigh Camilleri
5	DF	BRA	Gabriel Ventura
6	DF	MLT	Derston Saliba
7	MF	MLT	Dylan Agius
8	FW	NGA	Joseph Willy
9	FW	NGA	Philip Balotelli
10	MF	MLT	Darren Falzon
11	FW	MLT	Nathan Sultana

No.	Pos.	Nation	Player
12	GK	MLT	Jean Claude Debattista
14	DF	MLT	Isaac Chetcuti
15	FW	BRA	Hugo Santos
16	MF	NGA	Thomas Tegwi
17	FW	MLT	Lydon Sammut
18	DF	MLT	Christian Grech
19	MF	MLT	Jordan Ciantar
20	MF	MLT	Jordan Sciberras
21	MF	MLT	Luca Gatt
22	DF	MLT	Gaetano Gesualdi
23	MF	MLT	Ayrton Mizzi

=== Other players ===
Note: Flags indicate national team as defined under FIFA eligibility rules; some limited exceptions apply. Players may hold more than one non-FIFA nationality.

No.	Pos.	Nation	Player
—	DF	MLT	Mikele Vella
—	DF	MLT	Gianluca Tanti

No.	Pos.	Nation	Player
—	MF	MLT	Paul Glea
—	FW	COL	Miguel Pérez
