= Zurrieq FC Futsal =

Serbia Futsal Club

Żurrieq
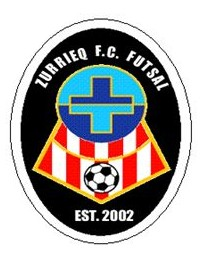
- Full name: Zurrieq FC Futsal Club
- Nicknames: The Reds, Żrieraq
- Founded: 2002; 24 years ago
- Dissolved: 2023; 3 years ago (fusion with St George's to form ZRQ Bormla)
- Ground: Corradino Pavilion, Paola, Malta
- Capacity: 1,000
- Chairman: none
- Manager: none
- League: none
- 2022-23: Maltese Futsal League, 5th

Żurrieq FC Futsal was a futsal section of Żurrieq F.C. founded in 2002. It represented Żurrieq, a town in the Western Region of Malta.

== History ==
=== Origins ===
The origins of Żurrieq F.C. Futsal date back to 1998, when a group of friends, then playing for Żurrieq F.C., began participating in local 5-a-side football tournaments. Many of these players would go on to form the core of the club's future futsal team. Initially known as the Hokuto Lions, the team quickly established itself as one of the leading 5-a-side teams in Żurrieq, finishing as runners-up in the 1998 Żurrieq Wolves Tournament. The following year, 1999, marked a peak for the Hokuto Lions, as they won both the Żurrieq Wolves Tournament and the Sezzjoni Żagħżagħ Karmelitani Tournament, while also securing third place in the prestigious 55-hour Żurrieq Football Marathon organized by CRZ. That same year, the Lions won the Żurrieq F.C. Summer League Knock-Out by defeating long-time rivals Xarolla United, and finished as runners-up in the league itself.

In 2000, after extensive training and dedication, the Hokuto Lions achieved a historic victory by winning the 55-hour futsal marathon without losing a single match - an unbeaten record never matched by any other team. In 2002, the team was officially renamed Żurrieq F.C. Futsal and began competing in the MFA Futsal League, starting from the Third Division, thus beginning their formal journey in Maltese futsal.

Żurrieq F.C. began their journey in the 2002–03 Maltese Futsal season, competing in Third Division Section B. The main objective for Żurrieq F.C. Futsal in their debut season was to secure promotion to the Second Division, a goal they successfully achieved in the same year. The club topped the section with 19 points from 8 matches, finishing ahead of Gremio United (14 points) and Jeepers Auto Trader (12 points), thereby earning promotion to the higher division. Players contributing to this achievement included Sammy Farrugia, Steven Hayman, Roderick Caruana, Godwin Monreal, Jason Cutajar, Alex Muscat, Ivan Zammit, Saviour Busuttil, Frankie Sammut, and Kevin Camilleri.

The next season, Żurrieq competed in the Second Division Section A, facing much stronger opposition, including top clubs such as Hibernians F.C. and Scandals. Żurrieq finished the campaign in fourth place.

The 2004–05 season brought greater success for Żurrieq F.C. Futsal. After winning Section B of the Second Division, Żurrieq went on to claim the title of Maltese Futsal Second Division champions. They secured the championship by defeating Konica Minolta Gunners in the final, winning 7–6 on penalties after a tightly contested match. The Gunners had one of the most iconic squad in Maltese futsal, featuring several former Malta national football team stalwarts, including John Buttigieg, Carmel Busuttil, Ray Farrugia, and Silvio Vella. Players who featured for the team from Żurrieq that season included Trevor Briffa, Steven Hayman, Sandro Mamo, Alex Abdilla, Marvin Bugeja, Sammy Farrugia, Tyron Borg, Reuben Collins, Saviour Busuttil, Frankie Sammut, Mario Farrugia, Ivan Zammit, and Alex Muscat.

In the 2009–10 season, Żrieraq finished as vice-champions of the Second Division - Section B, recording 7 wins and 3 draws in 12 games. At the end of the 2009–10 season, Żurrieq F.C. Futsal qualified for the promotion play-offs. They won the first round with a narrow 6–5 victory over Kerygma Kristal, advancing to the Futsal First Division Relegation/Second Division Promotion Decider. In the final, they faced Luxol Amazon Cinco. After a 3–3 draw in regular time, the team from St. Andrew's secured promotion by winning 6–3 on penalties, with Żurrieq narrowly missing out on a place in the First Division.

Żurrieq had to wait three more years before returning to the First Division, making their comeback in the 2013–14 season. The Reds finished the campaign in 14th place, narrowly missing the bottom of the table.

== Honours ==
Maltese Futsal League Third Division Section B: 1

- 2002-03

Maltese Futsal League Second Division Section B: 1

- 2004-05

Maltese Futsal League Second Division: 1

- 2004-05
