= Hibernians Futsal Club =

Serbia Futsal Club

Hibernians Futsal
- Full name: Hibernians F.C. Futsal Club
- Nicknames: Hibs, Raħal Ġdid, Paola, Pawlisti, The Peacocks
- Founded: 2002; 24 years ago
- Dissolved: 2014; 12 years ago
- Ground: Corradino Pavilion, Paola, Malta
- Capacity: 1,000
- Chairman: none
- Manager: none
- League: none
- 2013–14: Maltese Futsal League, 1th; Play-off Runners-up

Hibernians F.C. Futsal was a futsal team based in Malta. It was established in 2006 and was based in Paola, a town in the Port Region of Malta.

== History ==
=== Hibernians FC Futsal (2002-2007) ===
Hibernians F.C. Futsal began competing in the Maltese futsal scene during the 2002–03 season, a time when the sport was growing rapidly under the organization of the Malta Football Association (MFA). That season marked the fourth edition of Malta ’s official national futsal league, which featured three divisions and a Knockout Competition involving 39 teams. Hibernians competed in Section C of the Third Division where they played 8 matches, winning all 8 and finishing top of the table with 24 points. They scored 48 goals and conceded only 18, maintaining an undefeated record with no draws or losses. Some notable wins include a 10–2 victory over Kabul and an 8–2 away win against Mr Fish. Their dominant performance ensured they finished clear of Deportivo Santa Cruz, who placed second with 16 points.

Hibernians Futsal had a strong start in the 2002–03 Maltese Futsal Knockout Cup. After receiving a convincing 10–1 victory against Seven Magi Arredamenti in the first round, they progressed to the second round, where they narrowly defeated Gremio United 2–1. Their campaign ended in the quarter-finals after a tightly contested penalty shootout loss, 5–6 against Air Malta Cabin Crew. Despite the quarter-final exit, Hibernians’ performance demonstrated their competitiveness in the national cup tournament during the early years of Maltese futsal.

The following season, Hibs once again finished comfortably at the top of the table with 9 wins out of 10 games, leaving second-placed Scandals 12 points behind.The following season, Hibs once again finished comfortably at the top of the table with 9 wins out of 10 games, leaving second‑placed Scandals 12 points behind. In the following season, Hibs went two steps further in the knockout competition. They recorded four consecutive wins on their road to the cup final, defeating Dreamers 4–1, Vindaloo 7–2, Head Hunters 4–3, and then avenged their previous season's defeat by beating Air Malta Cabin Crew 6–1.In the final, they faced a Third Division side, Konica Gunners, which featured several former Malta national football team stalwarts, including John Buttigieg, Carmel Busuttil, Ray Farrugia, Martin Gregory, and Silvio Vella. The Gunners won 6–4 after extra time.

Hibs continued their strong form in the following season, once again finishing in first place during the league stage. This time, the Pawlisti won Section B of the top tier with 11 wins in 12 games, ending the stage 11 points ahead of second-placed King of Shaves. After topping Section B in the regular season, Hibernians advanced to the Championship Play-Offs of the 2004–05 Maltese Futsal First Division. In the semi-final, they delivered a dominant performance, defeating Air Malta Cabin Crew 8–2. This set up a highly anticipated final against Serbia, the winners of Section A. Despite a strong effort, Hibs fell short in the final, losing 7–4 and finishing the season as runners-up.

In the 2004–05 Futsal Knockout Competition, Hibernians had an impressive run, beginning with a commanding 11–3 victory against Lazio Supporters Club in the first round. After progressing through the second round by walkover (El Mundos), they overcame Konica Minolta Gunners 4–2 in the quarter-final. In the semi-finals, Hibs edged out Amazon FC 9–7, and ultimately secured the Knock‑Out Cup title with an 8–6 win over Air Malta Cabin Crew in the final held on 23 June.

Again, in the 2005–06 league stage, Hibernians ended up convincingly at the top of Section A with 10 wins in 12 games, 6 points ahead of second-placed El Mundos. The play-off run was even more convincing: Hibs thrashed Swing Kids 8–1 in the semi-final, while Serbia narrowly defeated El Mundos Fexco Western Union 6–5. In the final, Hibernians overcame Serbia 8–6 to win the title. On the other hand, the cup run was disappointing as, after an 8–4 win over Micab Futsal in the first round, Hibs suffered an early exit in the next round against Head Hunters, losing 1–4. Right after the season, UEFA announced a new format for its own UEFA Futsal Cup, which, for the first time in history, included a place for the Maltese champions.

=== Honours ===
- Maltese Futsal League runners up: 1

2004-05

- Maltese Futsal Knockout Cup: 1

2004-05

- Maltese Futsal Knockout Cup runners up: 1

2003-04

- The Maltese Futsal Third Division - Section C: 1

2002–03

- The Maltese Futsal Second Division - Section A: 1

2003-04
