= Balzan Futsal Club =

Football club in Balzan, Malta

Balzan Futsal
- Full name: Balzan Football Club Futsal
- Founded: 2000 (as ZC Excess), 2012 (as Balzan F.C.)
- Dissolved: 2015
- League: Maltese Futsal League
- Website: balzanfc1937.com
Home colours	Away colours

Balzan Football Club (futsal) was the futsal section of Balzan F.C., based in Balzan, Malta. Active from 2000 to 2015, the team competed in the Maltese Futsal League and quickly established itself as one of the country’s top futsal sides. During its short but successful existence, Balzan Futsal won multiple domestic titles and participated in the UEFA Futsal Champions League. The club ceased operations in 2015 following structural changes in Maltese futsal.

== History ==
The origins of the team go back to the club ZC Excess, which won the Maltese futsal championship in the 2009–10 and 2010–11 seasons.

In 2011, ZC Excess merged with River Plate Bidnija to form Excess RP Bidnija. This new entity won the 2011–12 national championship.

In 2012, the club became the official futsal team of Balzan F.C. and began competing under the name Balzan Football Club.

During the summer 2014, Balzan lost a host of players, among them player/coach Gabriel Dobre, Emil Raducu, Andrea Dan, Željko Aničić, Jovica Milijić, Reuben Grech and Christian Wismayer. However, they also appointed Bulgarian Boycho Marev as their new player-coach while securing the services of Italian player Marco Conti and Croatian international Frane Despotović. They have also signed promising youngster Matthew Attard, Mark Zammit, Eslam Khalifa and Karl Azzopardi.

== Honours ==
Maltese Futsal League

- Champions (4): 2009–10, 2010–11 (as ZC Excess), 2011–12 (as Excess RP Bidnija), 2013–14 (as Balzan FC)

Maltese Futsal Knockout Cup

- Winners (4): 2011–12 (as Excess RP Bidnija), 2012–13, 2013–14, 2014–15 (as Balzan FC)

== UEFA Futsal Cup ==
Balzan has participated in the preliminary rounds of the UEFA Futsal Cup on several occasions. Their first appearance as Balzan FC was in 2013-14 UEFA Futsal Cup.

== Notable Players and Coaches ==
One of the most notable figures during Balzan's successful era was Romanian international Gabriel Dobre, who acted as player-coach during their UEFA campaigns. Another Romanian international, Emil Răducu, played for the club.

Another key player was Jovica Milijić, who played a vital role in the 2013–14 season, scoring in both league and cup competitions. He left the club in August 2014.

== See also ==
- Balzan F.C.
- UEFA Futsal Champions League
