= Marsaskala Legends Futsal Club =

Marsaskala Legends Futsal
- Full name: Marsaskala Legends Futsal Club
- Nicknames: Legends, Sea Southsiders
- Ground: National Sports School Pavilion / De La Salle Pavilion
- Coach: (Malta) Jovica Milijić
- League: Maltese Futsal League
- 2025–26: In progress
Home colours

Marsaskala Legends Futsal Club is a futsal team based in the town of Marsaskala, located in southeastern Malta. The club currently competes in the Maltese Futsal League, Malta's top-tier futsal competition.

== History ==
=== Early participation ===
Marsaskala had a futsal team competing as early as the 2010–11 season, coinciding with the founding of Marsaskala F.C. as an amateur futsal club.

=== Recent years ===
Marsaskala Legends emerged under their current name in the early 2020s, gaining attention in the Maltese Futsal League.

In the 2024–25 season, the team made a strong start. On 21 October 2024, they recorded a dominant 5–0 win over the Malta U-19 national selection, their second consecutive victory. Just days later, they narrowly defeated the University of Malta team 5–4 to go top of the standings.

By January 2025, they were sitting fourth in the table with 13 points, despite a heavy 13–2 loss to defending champions Luxol.

=== Youth League ===
On 26 May 2023, Marsaskala won the MFA Youth Futsal Challenger Cup after defeating Pembroke Athleta 4–3.

== Home venue ==
Marsaskala Legends do not have a dedicated home arena but commonly play at the National Sports School Pavilion and De La Salle Pavilion, shared with other Maltese futsal clubs.

== Notable players ==
- Jovica Milijić
- Cristian Fernandez
- Owen Duca
- Dale Valletta
- John Mike Frias
- Amir Ashtiyani
