= Maltese Futsal Knockout Cup =

- Founded: 2002
- Region: Malta
- Teams: vary
- Current champions: University of Malta
- Most championships: University of Malta

The Maltese Futsal Knockout Cup (Maltese: Tazza tan-Nokawt tal-Futsal ta' Malta) is an annual cup competition for Maltese futsal teams. It is organised by the Futsal Malta Association, it is disputed by all futsal teams registered with the Association. It is the second highest national honour in futsal in Malta, after the Maltese Futsal League.

== Current Formula ==
The competition is a round-robin knockout competition.

== Champions ==
The most successful team in the competition is the current title holder, University of Malta, with a record four titles won in 2018, 2022, 2023, and, the most recently, in 2025.

Year	Winner	Score	Runner-up
2003	Buon Café	6-5 (AET)	Air Malta Cabin Crew
2004	Konica Minolta Gunners	6-4	Hibernians
2005	Hibernians	8-6	Air Malta Cabin Crew
2006	Stingrays	8-5	Head Hunters
2007	European Pilot Academy	10-5	Swing Kids
2008	Aluserv	8-5	European Pilot Academy
2009	Naxxar Motors	5-2	River Plate Bidnija
2010	Naxxar Motors	13-3	Los Street Boyz
2011	Naxxar Motors	5-1	Excess RP Bidnija
2012	ZC Excess	8-7	Paola Downtowns
2013	Balzan	6-3	Hibernians
2014	Balzan	9–2	Vittoriosa Stars
2015	Balzan	5-4	Luxol
2016	Luxol	7-3	Hamrun Tre Angeli
2017	Hamrun Tre Angeli	8-6	Valletta
2018	University of Malta	5-2	Luxol
2019	Luxol	6-2	Valletta
2020	season declared null and void due to COVID-19		
2021	cup not played due to Covid-19 pandemic		
2022	University of Malta	6-2	Luxol
2023	University of Malta	3-2	Luxol
2024	Luxol	8-0	ZRQ Bormla
2025	University of Malta	2-1	Luxol
