= Valletta FC Futsal Club =

Sports club in Malta

Valletta FC Futsal
- Full name: Valletta FC Futsal
- Nicknames: City, Lions, Whites, Lilywhites, Citizens
- Founded: 2012; 13 years ago as Valletta Futsal
- Ground: Kordin Pavilion, Paola, Malta
- Capacity: 1,000
- Chairman: (Malta) Chris McKay
- Coach: (Malta) Carlo Scicluna
- League: Maltese Futsal League
- 2017-18: Maltese Futsal League, 1st
- Website: http://www.vallettafcfutsal.com/
Home colours	Away colours

Valletta FC Futsal is a Maltese futsal club based in Valletta, Malta. They are the current domestic champions 2017/2018.

Valletta started their futsal league commitments in year 2012/2013 where the club ended up being relegated from premier to first division after losing 14 out of 18 matches.

In the following season 2013-2014, Valletta FC futsal revamped themselves, and the lions ended up snatching the title of First Division after winning 17 out of 18 matches.

In season 2014-2015, Valletta FC ended their league commitments in fourth place – progressed to the play-offs, however, they suffered a hefty aggregate defeat to Luxol in the semi-final of playoffs whilst also lost 10-2 to Balzan in the cup Semi-Final.

Season 15-16 was the best season so far with Valletta. Led by coach Clayton Felice, Valletta FC futsal won the title after beating Hamrun in the final match of the playoff final 4-1. However, in the same season Valletta FC lost to Luxol in the cup Quarter Final and lost to Luxol in the Super Cup 5-9.

In season 2016-2017, Valletta ended up the season in 2nd place however, lost the play-offs final against Luxol. During the same season, Valletta went on to lose also the cup final against Hamrun 6-8.

== 2017–18 squad ==
No.	Player	Pos.	Nat.
1	Tornike Bukia	Goalkeeper	(Georgia (country))
2	Ninoslav Aleksić	Winger	(Serbia)
4	Murtaz Kakabadze	Sweeper	(Georgia (country))
5	Jovica Milijić	Sweeper	(Malta)
6	Redeemer Borg	Sweeper	(Malta)
8	Melvin Borg (Captain)	Winger	(Malta)
10	Gia Nikvashvili	Pivot	(Georgia (country))
11	Dylan Musu	Winger	(Malta)
12	Brandon Debono	Goalkeeper	(Malta)
14	Shawn Vella	Pivot	(Malta)
16	Yerai	Winger	(Spain)
17	Camilo Gómez	Winger	(Colombia)
18	Mohammed El Amari	Winger	(Libya)
19	Denis Di Maio	Pivot	(Italy)
21	Shawn Deguara	Winger	(Malta)
	Stefan Vella	Goalkeeper	(Malta)
