= Ħamrun Spartans Futsal Club =

Sports club in Malta

Hamrun Spartans
- Full name: Hamrun Spartans Futsal
- Nicknames: Tas-Sikkina, Ta' Werwer
- Founded: 2005; 20 years ago as Hamrun Spartans
- Ground: Corradino Pavilion, Paola, Malta
- Capacity: 1,000
- Chairman: (Malta) unknown
- Coach: unknown
- League: Maltese Futsal League
- 2017-18: Maltese Futsal League, 3rd
Home colours	Away colours

Ħamrun Spartans Futsal is a Maltese futsal club based in Ħamrun, Malta. After achieving a commendable third-place finish in the 2017-18 season, Ħamrun ceased operations and withdrew from domestic competition. The club remained inactive for several years before being reestablished in 2024, marking its return to the Maltese futsal scene.

Hamrun started their futsal league commitments in the year of 2005. Competing under the name of Ħamrun Tre Angeli, they enjoyed success in the domestic cup, reaching the final in 2016 where they lost to Luxol 7–3, but bouncing back to win the title in 2017 with a victory over Valletta.

The most recent success, the club from Tas-Sikkina had it their first season of return, winning the FMA Futsal Challenger Cup.

== Notable players ==
(Malta) Jovica Milijić

== Honours ==
- Maltese Futsal Knockout Cup:
  - Winners (1): 2016-17
  - Runners-up (1): 2015-16
- FMA Futsal Challenger Cup:
  - Winners (1): 2024-25
