= Maltese Futsal League =

Futsal league in Malta

- Founded: 1999, 2011
- Country: Malta
- Confederation: UEFA
- Number of clubs: 9
- Level on pyramid: 1
- Domestic cup: Laferla Futsal Knockout Cup
- International cup: UEFA Futsal Cup
- Current champions: Luxol (2024–25)
- Most championships: Luxol (9 titles)
- Website: Futsal Malta Association
- Current: 2024–25 Maltese Futsal League

The Maltese Futsal League, (Maltese: il-Lig tal-Futsal Malti), formerly the Gatorade League but now known as the Enemed Futsal League for sponsorship reasons, is the official professional futsal league in Malta and was founded in 2011. The Maltese futsal championship currently consists of 11 teams. It is organised by the Futsal Malta Association and the Malta Football Association. During the first half of the season, all 11 teams play the qualifying phase in two groups. The top 2 teams of each group qualify to the Premier League, the highest tier. The two third placed teams from each group play a decider match to decide who earns the final slot in the Premier League. All other teams ranked 4th and lower, plus the loser from the third place decider match, play in the Challenge League, the second tier.

The league is played entirely in National Sport School in Pembroke, formerly at the Corradino Sports Pavilion.

== History ==
First 'official' five-a-side tournaments were held at Athleta Sliema till 1997. In the early 90s the teams which dominated were Athleta A & B and Ace of Clubs made up mainly of Uni students (AOC first team founded by Peter Micallef, Jonathan Pace and John Mayl). Futsal has been officially played since 1998. The league started in 1999 when three University students, who had organized the unofficial Dr. Stanley's Workshop five-a-side league, contacted the Malta FA. Laboratoires Alta Care were the first well-documented league winner of any Maltese futsal championship. The club won two titles in a row, for the season 2000-01 and 2001-02.

The league was created in 2011. The highest peak saw 4 divisions with over 70 teams. Teams started decreasing when the Futsal Malta Association made requirements more stringent to make the league more professional.

Eventually, with a further decrease in teams, only one division was necessary, which became known as the Maltese Futsal League, as of the 2015–2016 season.

== Champions ==
Key

†	League champions also won the Maltese Futsal Knockout Cup, i.e. they completed the domestic Double.

Season	Champions (titles)	Runners-up	League winner	Top league scorer		
Season	Champions (titles)	Runners-up	League winner	Player (Club)	Nat.	Goals
1999–2000 (1st)	Ace Of Clubs					
2000–01 (2nd)	Laboratoires Alta Care(1)					
2001–02 (3rd)	Laboratoires Alta Care(2)					
2002–03 (4th)	Air Malta Cabine Crew (1)	Alta Care	Swing Kids (group A) King of Shaves (gr. B)			
2003–04 (5th)	RBSM (1)	El Mundos	El Mundos (group A) RBSM (group B)			
2004–05 (6th)	Serbia (2)	Hibernians	Serbia (Group A) Hibernians (Group B)			
2005–06 (7th)	Hibernians (1)	Serbia	Hibernians (Group A) Serbia (Group B)			
2006–07 (8th)	Jeepers Handyman Centre (1) †	European Pilot Academy	Jeepers Handyman Centre (Group A) European Pilot Academy (Group B)			
2007–08 (9th)	Scandals (1) †	European Pilot Academy	Aluserv			
2008–09 (10th)	White Eagles (3)	Jeepers Handyman Centre	Naxxar Motors			
2009–10 (11th)	ZC Excess (1) †	Naxxar Motors	Naxxar Motors	Aleksandar Ribić (Naxxar Motors)	SRB	?
2010–11 (12th)	ZC Excess (2)	Paola Downtown	ZC Excess	Jovica Milijić (Paola Downtown)	SRB	42
2011–12 (13th)	Excess RP Bidnija (3) †	Naxxar Motors	Excess RP Bidnija	Aleksandar Ribić (Excess RP Bidnija)	SRB	40
2012–13 (14th)	Hibernians (2)	Balzan	Balzan			
2013–14 (15th)	Balzan (1) †	Hibernians	Hibernians	Tyron Borg (Zurieq)	MLT	47+
2014–15 (16th)	Luxol (1)	Balzan	Luxol	William da Silva Barbosa (Luxol)	BRA	
2015–16 (17th)	Valletta (1)					
2016–17 (18th)	Luxol (2)			Raphael Felipe Ortiz de Oliveira (Valletta)	BRA	75
2017–18 (19th)	Valletta (2)	Luxol	Luxol			
2018–19 (20th)	Luxol (3) †	Valletta				
2019–20 (21st)	Luxol (4)	Valletta	Luxol	Mark Zammit (Luxol)	MLT	10
2020–21 (22nd)	Luxol(5)					
2021–22 (23rd)	Luxol(6)					
2022–23 (24th)	Luxol(7)					
2023–24 (25th)	Luxol(8) †	University of Malta ACJ Group	University of Malta ACJ Group			
2024–25 (26th)	Luxol(9)	Swieqi United LEC07		Ezequiel Alarcón (Swieqi United LEC07)	ARG	24
2025–26 (27th)						

=== Performance by club ===
Club	Champions	Runners-up	Third place

== 2016–2017 season ==
In the 2016–17 season, the FMA reopened to independent teams not part of a football club from within the Maltese football league system.

=== Format ===
There are 14 teams which shall play each other once. After this round, the teams split into the top 6 teams, known as the Elite pool, and the remainder play in the Division One pool. The Elite teams play each other once again and the first 4 after this round, enter a knockout playoff stage. The winner of the playoff stage enters the UEFA Futsal League cup.

=== Teams ===
- Birzebbuga St. Peter's
- Futsal Selection U18
- Futsal Selection U19
- Gzira United Santa Margerita
- Marsascala Futsal
- Sliema Futsal Fort Fitness
- Luxol Futsal
- Swieqi Utd Futsal
- Ta' Xbiex
- University of Malta Students' Futsal Team
- ŻRQ Bormla

== 2025-2026 season ==
=== Format ===
There are 9 teams which shall play each other once. After this round, the teams split into the top 5 teams, known as the Malta Futsal Premier League, and the remaining 4 play in the Malta Futsal Challenge League. The Elite teams play each other once again and the first 4 after this round, enter a knockout playoff stage while the fifth place team enters the playoff structure to compete for the Malta Futsal Challenge League Trophy. The winner of the playoff stage enters the UEFA Futsal League cup.

=== Teams ===
In order after the first round:

Malta Futsal Premier League:

- Luxol Futsal
- University of Malta Students' Futsal Team
- Marsascala Futsal
- Birzebbuga St. Peter's
- Żejtun Corinthians Futsal WA

Malta Futsal Challenge League:

- Futsal Selection U19
- Sliema Fort Fitness
- Santa Venera Futsal
- Futsal Selection U17
