= Luxol St Andrews Futsal Club =

Maltese futsal club

Luxol St. Andrews Futsal
- Full name: Luxol St. Andrews Futsal
- Nicknames: Luxol, The Saints
- Founded: 1998; 27 years ago
- Ground: Pembroke, Malta
- Chairman: Joseph Aquilina
- Coach: (Romania) Gabriel Dobre
- League: Maltese Futsal League
- 2021–22: 1st
Home colours	Away colours

Luxol St Andrews Futsal Club is a Maltese futsal club based in St. Andrew's. In recent season it has been one of the most successful clubs on the island, winning five league titles and one cup.

== Current squad ==
The following players played the 2021–22 UEFA Futsal Champions League.

#	Position	Name	Nationality
1	Goalkeeper	Kenneth Rakvaag	(Norway)
3	Defender	Celino Alves	(Brazil)
4	Pivot	Herick Oliveira	(Brazil)
5	Defender	Dale Camileri	(Malta)
6	Winger	Vevé	(Brazil)
7	Pivot	Matthew Attard	(Malta)
8	Defender	Melvin Borg	(Malta)
9	Pivot	Mark Zammit	(Malta)
10	Winger	Maikinho	(Brazil)
11	Winger	Hebberth Bolt	(Brazil)
12	Goalkeeper	Stefan Vella	(Malta)
14	Defender	Marrwan Telisi	(Malta)
15	Defender	Jean Costa	(Brazil)
18	Winger	Carl Azzopardi	(Malta)
19	Winger	Emil Răducu	(Romania)

=== Captaincy ===
1. Mark Zammit

== Technical staff ==
- Head coach: (Romania) Gabriel Dobre

== Achievements ==
- Maltese Futsal League

Winners (9): 2014–15, 2016–17, 2018–19, 2019–20, 2020–21, 2021–22, 2022–23, 2023–24, 2024–25

- Maltese Futsal Cup

Winners (2): 2015–16, 2018–19,

- Maltese Futsal Super Cup

Winners (6): 2015-16,2016–17, 2017–18, 2022–2023, 2023-24, 2024-25

== European competitions record ==
Appearances: 5

Season	Competition	Round	Country	Club	Result	Venue (Host City)	Qualified
2015–16	UEFA Futsal Cup	Preliminary round (Group B)	(Italy)	ASD Pescara	0–9	Centre Esportiu Serradells (Andorra la Vella)	3rd place
2015–16	UEFA Futsal Cup	Preliminary round (Group B)	(Andorra)	FC Encamp	5–3	Centre Esportiu Serradells (Andorra la Vella)	3rd place
2015–16	UEFA Futsal Cup	Preliminary round (Group B)	(Denmark)	JB Futsal Gentofte	5–5	Centre Esportiu Serradells (Andorra la Vella)	3rd place
2017–18	UEFA Futsal Cup	Preliminary round (Group C)	(Austria)	Diamantz Linz	7–1	Sporthalle Europagymnasium; Linz-Auhof (Linz)	1st place
2017–18	UEFA Futsal Cup	Preliminary round (Group C)	(North Macedonia)	Shkupi	9–2	Sporthalle Europagymnasium; Linz-Auhof (Linz)	1st place
2017–18	UEFA Futsal Cup	Preliminary round (Group C)	(Israel)	Maccabi Futsal	4–3	Sporthalle Europagymnasium; Linz-Auhof (Linz)	1st place
2017–18	UEFA Futsal Cup	Main round (Group 8)	(Romania)	Autobergamo Deva	2–5	Sports Hall (Deva)	3rd place
2017–18	UEFA Futsal Cup	Main round (Group 8)	(Azerbaijan)	Araz Naxçivan	4–6	Sports Hall (Deva)	3rd place
2017–18	UEFA Futsal Cup	Main round (Group 8)	(Bosnia and Herzegovina)	Mostar SG Staklorad	5–2	Sports Hall (Deva)	3rd place
2019–20	UEFA Futsal; Champions League	Preliminary round (Group F)	(San Marino)	Fiorentino	5–0	Tromsøhallen (Tromsø)	1st place
2019–20	UEFA Futsal; Champions League	Preliminary round (Group F)	(Moldova)	Dinamo Chişinău	5–3	Tromsøhallen (Tromsø)	1st place
2019–20	UEFA Futsal; Champions League	Preliminary round (Group F)	(Norway)	Sjarmtrollan	8–3	Tromsøhallen (Tromsø)	1st place
2019–20	UEFA Futsal; Champions League	Main round (Group 5)	(Poland)	Rekord Bielsko-Biała	1–3	Arena Sparta (Prague)	4th place
2019–20	UEFA Futsal; Champions League	Main round (Group 5)	(Czech Republic)	Sparta Praha	1–5	Arena Sparta (Prague)	4th place
2019–20	UEFA Futsal; Champions League	Main round (Group 5)	(Romania)	Miercurea Ciuc	2–2	Arena Sparta (Prague)	4th place
2020–21	UEFA Futsal; Champions League	Preliminary round	(Austria)	Allstars	6–2	Landessportzentrum VIVA (Steinbrunn)	
2020–21	UEFA Futsal; Champions League	Round of 32	(Slovenia)	Dobovec	2–3	Tal-Qroqq University Sports Hall (Gżira)	
2021–22	UEFA Futsal; Champions League	Preliminary round (Group A)	(Wales)	Cefn Druids	5–0	Sport Hall "26-ti April" (Gevgelija)	1st place
2021–22	UEFA Futsal; Champions League	Preliminary round (Group A)	(Israel)	Ashdod Dolphins	8–0	Sport Hall "26-ti April" (Gevgelija)	1st place
2021–22	UEFA Futsal; Champions League	Preliminary round (Group A)	(North Macedonia)	Proekt	5–0	Sport Hall "26-ti April" (Gevgelija)	1st place
2021–22	UEFA Futsal; Champions League	Main round (Group 5)	(Hungary)	Haladás	2–6	Tal-Qroqq University; Sports Hall (Gżira)	3rd place
2021–22	UEFA Futsal; Champions League	Main round (Group 5)	(Sweden)	Hammarby	3–2	Tal-Qroqq University; Sports Hall (Gżira)	3rd place
2021–22	UEFA Futsal; Champions League	Main round (Group 5)	(Poland)	Rekord Bielsko-Biała	1–1	Tal-Qroqq University; Sports Hall (Gżira)	3rd place

=== Summary ===
UEFA competitions
Competition	Played	Won	Drawn	Lost	Goals For	Goals Against	Goal Difference	Last season played
UEFA Futsal Cup	9	5	1	3	41	36	+5	2017–18
UEFA Futsal; Champions League	14	8	2	4	54	30	+24	2021–22
Total	23	13	3	7	95	66	+29	

== Famous players ==
- (Brazil) William da Silva Barbosa
- (Malta) Matthew Attard
- (Malta) Mark Zammit
