= 2022–23 Maltese Challenge League =

Maltese Challenge League
- Season: 2022–23
- Dates: 26 August 2022 – 23 April 2023
- Champions: Sliema Wanderers
- Promoted: Sliema Wanderers; Naxxar Lions
- Relegated: Marsaskala; Mqabba; Mtarfa; Qrendi; San Gwann; Vittoriosa Stars
- Matches: 252
- Goals: 662 (2.63 per match)
- Top goalscorer: (Brazil) Aroldo Da Silva Arruda (23 Goals)
- Biggest home win: Fgura United 6-1 Vittoriosa Stars (8 December 2022)
- Biggest away win: Mqabba 0-6 Fgura United (29 August 2022); Vittoriosa Stars 0-6 Naxxar Lions (20 December 2022)
- Highest scoring: Swieqi United 5-5 Mqabba (10 December 2022)
- Longest winning run: Sliema Wanderers (15 Games)
- Longest unbeaten run: Sliema Wanderers (27 Games)
- Longest winless run: Mtarfa (10 Games)
- Longest losing run: Mtarfa (10 Games)
- All statistics correct as of 23 April 2023.

The 2022–23 Maltese Challenge League (referred to as the BOV Challenge League for sponsorship reasons) is the second-level league football in Malta. It is the third season that the competition has been running in its present form.

== Team changes ==
The following teams have changed division since the 2021–22 season:

=== To Maltese Challenge League ===
Promoted from Maltese National Amateur League

- Żurrieq
- Attard
- Marsaskala
- Mtarfa

Relegated from the Maltese Premier League

- Sliema Wanderers

=== From Maltese Challenge League ===
Promoted to the Maltese Premier League

- Marsaxlokk
- Pietà Hotspurs
- Żebbuġ Rangers

Relegated to Maltese National Amateur League

- Luqa St. Andrew's
- Mġarr United
- Pembroke Athleta
- Rabat Ajax F.C.
- Senglea Athletic
- St. George's

== Teams ==
Location of teams in 2022–23 Maltese Challenge League

Eighteen teams will compete in the league which will include the Four teams promoted from the Amateur League and one team relegated from the Premier League. This Season will be playing only one round. After the first round, the top six will play each other twice to determine whether to win the Challenge League, be promoted, or stay in Challenge League next season. And those who finish seventh till eighteenth in the first round will play once in Play-Out to determine who will stay in Challenge League or have either been relegated.

Team	Location
Attard	Attard
Fgura United	Fgura
Lija Athletic	Lija
Marsa	Marsa
Marsaskala	Marsaskala
Melita	San Ġiljan
Mqabba	Mqabba
Mtarfa	Mtarfa
Naxxar Lions	Naxxar
Qrendi	Qrendi
San Ġwann	San Ġwann
Sliema Wanderers	Sliema
St. Andrews	St. Andrew's, Malta
Swieqi United	Swieqi
Tarxien Rainbows	Tarxien
Vittoriosa Stars	Birgu
Żejtun Corinthians	Zejtun
Żurrieq	Żurrieq

== Venues ==
On 21 December 2022. The Malta Football Association introduce another stadium at Luxol Stadium in Pembroke due to the final fixture of the first round that played three matches at the same time. On 21 December 2022. The Malta Football Association introduce another stadium at Sirens Stadium in San Pawl il-Baħar due to the final fixture of the season that is playing four matches at the same time.

2022–23 Maltese Challenge League is located in Malta	Ta' Qali	Hamrun	Pembroke	San Pawl il-Baħar
2022–23 Maltese Challenge League is located in Malta	Centenary Stadium	Victor Tedesco Stadium	Luxol Stadium	Sirens Stadium
2022–23 Maltese Challenge League is located in Malta	Capacity: 3,000	Capacity: 1,962	Capacity: 600	Capacity: 800

== League table ==
Pos	Team	Pld	W	D	L	GF	GA	GD	Pts	Qualification or relegation
1	Sliema Wanderers	17	15	2	0	40	10	+30	47	Qualification for the Top Six
2	Naxxar Lions	17	13	2	2	40	15	+25	41	Qualification for the Top Six
3	Żejtun Corinthians	17	11	0	6	35	22	+13	33	Qualification for the Top Six
4	Tarxien Rainbows	17	9	5	3	34	19	+15	32	Qualification for the Top Six
5	Żurrieq	17	9	2	6	33	28	+5	29	Qualification for the Top Six
6	Melita	17	7	5	5	29	22	+7	26	Qualification for the Top Six
7	Fgura United	17	7	4	6	41	25	+16	25	Qualification for the Play-Out
8	Marsa	17	6	6	5	27	23	+4	24	Qualification for the Play-Out
9	Swieqi United	17	6	6	5	33	31	+2	24	Qualification for the Play-Out
10	St. Andrews	17	6	4	7	23	27	−4	22	Qualification for the Play-Out
11	Lija Athletic	17	5	5	7	28	32	−4	20	Qualification for the Play-Out
12	Attard	17	5	4	8	19	30	−11	19	Qualification for the Play-Out
13	San Ġwann	17	5	3	9	20	34	−14	18	Qualification for the Play-Out
14	Marsaskala	17	4	3	10	28	39	−11	15	Qualification for the Play-Out
15	Mqabba	17	4	3	10	21	36	−15	15	Qualification for the Play-Out
16	Qrendi	17	3	5	9	19	36	−17	14	Qualification for the Play-Out
17	Mtarfa	17	4	2	11	11	28	−17	14	Qualification for the Play-Out
18	Vittoriosa Stars	17	3	1	13	14	38	−24	10	Qualification for the Play-Out

Updated to match(es) played on 8 January 2023. Source:
Rules for classification: 1) Points; 2) Play-offs (only if needed to decide champions or teams for relegation).

== Results ==
Home \ Away	ATT	FGU	LJA	MSA	MRK	MEL	MQA	MTF	NXR	QRE	SGN	SLI	STA	SWQ	TAR	VIT	ZEJ	ZUR
Attard	—	—	—	—	—	2–4	0–1	3–1	1–3	0–0	—	0–4	1–1	3–1	1–4	—	—	—
Fgura United	0–0	—	2–2	0–0	2–0	—	—	—	2–3	—	4–0	—	—	—	—	6–1	4–1	1–4
Lija Athletic	2–1	—	—	0–2	—	—	—	0–0	—	—	1–2	—	—	2–2	1–2	2–0	2–4	—
Marsa	2–2	—	—	—	—	0–2	2–1	2–0	—	4–0	—	—	—	2–0	3–3	1–1	—	—
Marsaskala	2–0	—	2–4	2–2	—	—	—	3–1	0–3	—	1–2	—	—	—	—	2–1	0–1	1–2
Melita	—	2–4	2–2	—	2–1	—	2–1	—	—	1–1	—	0–1	6–2	—	—	—	—	3–0
Mqabba	—	0–6	1–2	—	3–3	—	—	—	—	2–0	2–3	1–2	0–1	—	—	—	—	1–0
Mtarfa	—	0–2	—	—	—	0–0	1–0	—	0–1	2–3	—	1–3	0–4	2–1	2–1	—	—	—
Naxxar Lions	—	—	3–2	2–0	—	2–0	1–1	—	—	2–0	1–0	1–2	—	1–3	—	—	3–2	—
Qrendi	—	4–3	3–3	—	2–3	—	—	—	—	—	3–0	0–2	0–0	—	—	—	0–3	2–5
San Ġwann	0–1	—	—	2–2	—	1–1	—	1–0	—	—	—	—	—	2–4	1–4	3–1	0–2	—
Sliema Wanderers	—	2–1	1–0	1–0	5–1	—	—	—	—	—	3–1	—	3–0	—	—	—	3–0	3–0
St. Andrews	—	3–2	0–2	2–3	2–2	—	—	—	0–3	—	1–1	—	—	—	—	2–0	0–2	3–1
Swieqi United	—	1–1	—	—	4–3	2–0	5–5	—	—	1–1	—	2–2	0–2	—	—	—	—	2–2
Tarxien Rainbows	—	2–1	—	—	3–2	0–0	1–2	—	1–1	4–0	—	1–1	1–0	0–2	—	—	—	—
Vittoriosa Stars	0–1	—	—	—	—	0–4	3–0	3–0	0–6	1–0	—	1–2	—	0–3	0–2	—	—	—
Żejtun Corinthians	4–1	—	—	2–1	—	3–0	4–0	0–1	—	—	—	—	—	3–0	1–4	2–1	—	—
Żurrieq	1–2	—	5–1	3–1	—	—	—	1–0	1–4	—	3–1	—	—	—	1–1	2–1	2–1	—

Updated to match(es) played on 8 January 2023. Source: [https://matchcentre.mfa.com.mt/competition/2601248/
Legend: Blue = home team win; Yellow = draw; Red = away team win.
For upcoming matches, an "a" indicates there is an article about the rivalry between the two participants.

== Second phase ==
=== Top Six ===
Pos	Team	Pld	W	D	L	GF	GA	GD	Pts	Qualification or relegation	SLI	NXR	ZEJ	TAR	MEL	ZUR
1	Sliema Wanderers (C)	27	24	3	0	66	15	+51	75	Promotion to the 2023–24 Maltese Premier League	—	3–1	6–0	0–0	1–0	5–0
2	Naxxar Lions (P)	27	19	3	5	58	28	+30	60	Promotion to the 2023–24 Maltese Premier League	0–2	—	0–0	2–1	0–5	3–0
3	Żejtun Corinthians (Q)	27	15	2	10	51	45	+6	47	Qualification for the Promotion play-offs	1–3	1–2	—	0–4	2–2	2–1
4	Tarxien Rainbows	27	13	7	7	55	32	+23	46		2–3	0–3	2–3	—	3–0	4–0
5	Melita	27	9	7	11	42	36	+6	34		0–2	1–2	2–3	0–0	—	0–1
6	Żurrieq	27	10	2	15	38	59	−21	32		0–1	0–5	1–4	2–5	0–3	—

Source: Malta Football Association
Rules for classification: 1) Points; 2) Play-offs (only if needed to decide champions or Promotion play-offs).
(C) Champions; (P) Promoted; (Q) Qualified for the phase indicated

=== Play-Out ===
Pos	Team	Pld	W	D	L	GF	GA	GD	Pts	Relegation	SWQ	FGU	STA	LJA	ATT	MSA	SGN	QRE	MRK	MQA	VIT	MTF
7	Swieqi United	28	14	8	6	53	38	+15	50		—	2–2	—	—	—	3–0	2–0	—	2–1	2–0	—	2–1
8	Fgura United	28	11	8	9	57	39	+18	41		—	—	2–0	—	0–1	—	1–1	—	1–1	—	—	1–1
9	St. Andrews	28	11	7	10	37	40	−3	40		0–0	—	—	1–3	2–1	—	1–1	—	2–2	—	—	2–1
10	Lija Athletic	28	11	6	11	51	54	−3	39		0–4	4–2	—	—	—	0–1	—	4–5	—	3–2	4–3	—
11	Attard	28	10	7	11	39	45	−6	37		3–0	—	—	1–1	—	—	1–1	1–4	2–2	—	—	5–2
12	Marsa	28	9	8	11	40	42	−2	35		—	1–3	0–2	—	1–2	—	1–2	—	—	—	—	0–0
13	San Gwann (R)	28	9	7	12	33	45	−12	34	Relegation to the 2023–24 Maltese National Amateur League	—	—	—	2–0	—	—	—	0–1	1–1	—	0–1	2–1
14	Qrendi (R)	28	8	7	13	38	52	−14	31	Relegation to the 2023–24 Maltese National Amateur League	0–1	1–2	0–2	—	—	2–2	—	—	—	0–1	2–2	—
15	Marsaskala (R)	28	7	8	13	50	57	−7	29	Relegation to the 2023–24 Maltese National Amateur League	—	—	—	1–3	—	3–1	—	1–3	—	5–0	3–1	—
16	Mqabba (R)	28	6	4	18	29	56	−27	22	Relegation to the 2023–24 Maltese National Amateur League	—	1–2	0–1	—	1–0	1–2	1–3	—	—	—	—	—
17	Vittoriosa Stars (R)	28	6	4	18	27	57	−30	22	Relegation to the 2023–24 Maltese National Amateur League	0–2	1–0	3–1	—	1–3	1–4	—	—	—	0–0	—	—
18	Mtarfa (R)	28	5	6	17	21	45	−24	21	Relegation to the 2023–24 Maltese National Amateur League	—	—	—	0–1	—	—	—	0–1	2–2	2–1	0–0	—

Updated to match(es) played on 23 April 2023. Source: Malta Football Association
Rules for classification: 1) Points; 2) Play-offs (only if needed to decide teams for relegation).
(R) Relegated

== Promotion or Relegation play-offs ==
A play-offs match shall be played between the twelfth-placed team in the Premier League, Santa Lucia, and the third-placed team in the Maltese Challenge League, Żejtun Corinthians. The winner will play in the 2023-24 Maltese Premier League.

28 April 2023	Santa Lucia (1)	2–0	Żejtun Corinthians (2)	Ta' Qali
19:00 CEST	Kyrian Nwoko 2'; Robert Hehedosh 17'			Stadium: Centenary Stadium; Referee: Fyodor Zammit

== Season statistics ==
=== Top scorers ===
As of 23 April 2023

Rank	Player	Club	Goals
1	(Brazil) Aroldo Da Silva Arruda	Fgura United	23
2	(Colombia) Robinson Blandon Rendon	Naxxar Lions	18
3	(Trinidad and Tobago) Rundell Winchester	Marsaskala	17
4	(Colombia) Duvan Mosquera Torres	Lija Athletic	16
4	(Malta) Lydon Micallef	Sliema Wanderers	16
6	(Malta) Adrian Carabott	Marsaskala	15
6	(Brazil) Claudio Antunes Pavlidis	Qrendi	15
8	(Japan) Hiroya Konno	Melita	14
8	(Brazil) Joao Vitor de Oliveira Florencio	Żurrieq	14
10	(Brazil) Edson Cerqueira Farias	Naxxar Lions	12
10	(Brazil) Andre Carlos Penha da Costa	Żejtun Corinthians	12

=== Hat-tricks ===
Player	For	Against	Result	Stadium	Date
(Brazil) Aroldo Da Silva Arruda	Fgura United	Mqabba	6–0 (A)	Centenary Stadium, Ta' Qali	29 August 2022
(Brazil) Aroldo Da Silva Arruda	Fgura United	Melita	4–2 (A)	Victor Tedesco Stadium, Hamrun	8 September 2022
(Japan) Hiroya Konno	Melita	Attard	4–2 (A)	Victor Tedesco Stadium, Hamrun	11 September 2022
(Japan) Hiroya Konno	Melita	St. Andrews	6–2 (H)	Victor Tedesco Stadium, Hamrun	2 October 2022
(Brazil) Matheus De Lucena Guariento	San Gwann	Vittoriosa Stars	3–0 (H)	Victor Tedesco Stadium, Hamrun	2 October 2022
(Japan) Hiroya Konno	Melita	Vittoriosa Stars	4–0 (A)	Centenary Stadium, Ta' Qali	9 October 2022
(Malta) Nicholas Schembri	Attard	Mtarfa	3–1 (H)	Centenary Stadium, Ta' Qali	5 November 2022
(Brazil) Lucas Matheus Dos Santos	Mqabba	Swieqi United	5–5 (H)	Centenary Stadium, Ta' Qali	10 December 2022
(Brazil) Pavlidis Claudio Antunes	Qrendi	Mtarfa	3–2 (H)	Centenary Stadium, Ta' Qali	18 December 2022
(Brazil) Pavlidis Claudio Antunes	Qrendi	Fgura United	4–3 (H)	Victor Tedesco Stadium, Hamrun	21 December 2022
(Brazil) Aroldo Da Silva Arruda	Fgura United	Żejtun Corinthians	4–1 (H)	Victor Tedesco Stadium, Hamrun	7 January 2023
(Brazil) Joao Vitor De Oliveira Florencio^{4}	Żurrieq	Lija Athletic	5–1 (H)	Centenary Stadium, Ta' Qali	8 January 2023
(Colombia) Robinson Blandon Rendon	Naxxar Lions	Żurrieq	3–0 (H)	Centenary Stadium, Ta' Qali	5 February 2023
(Netherlands) Suleiman Jalu	Qrendi	Attard	4–1 (A)	Victor Tedesco Stadium, Hamrun	25 February 2023
(Colombia) Duvan Mosquera Torres	Lija Athletic	Vittoriosa Stars	4–3 (H)	Victor Tedesco Stadium, Hamrun	5 March 2023
(Colombia) Robinson Blandon Rendon	Naxxar Lions	Żurrieq	5–0 (A)	Centenary Stadium, Ta' Qali	8 April 2023
(Japan) Hiroya Konno	Melita	Naxxar Lions	5–0 (A)	Luxol Stadium, Pembroke	22 April 2023

Notes

^{4} Player scored 4 goals

=== Clean sheets ===
Rank	Player	Club	Clean sheets
1	(Malta) Rashed Al-Tumi	Sliema Wanderers	11
2	(Malta) Yenz Cini	Naxxar	10
3	(Malta) Jean Claude Debattista	Swieqi United	9
4	(Malta) Miguel Montfort	St. Andrews	8
5	(Malta) Julian Azzopardi	Fgura United	7
5	(Malta) Ryan Caruana	Melita	7
5	(Malta) Sean Mintoff	Żejtun Corinthians/Qrendi	7
8	(Malta) Zach Valletta	Attard	6
9	(Malta) Nicholas Vella	Marsa	5
9	(Malta) Jean Mattiase` Vella	Mtarfa	5
9	(Malta) Matthias Debono	Tarxien Rainbows	5
9	(Malta) Christian Cassar	Vittoriosa Stars	5

=== Discipline ===
==== Club ====
- Most yellow cards: 82
  - Mqabba
- Most red cards: 7
  - Mtarfa
  - Vittoriosa Stars
