= 2023–24 Maltese Challenge League =

Maltese Challenge League
- Season: 2023–24
- Dates: 16 September 2023 – 5 May 2024
- Champions: Melita
- Promoted: Melita; Żabbar St. Patrick
- Relegated: Attard; Luqa St. Andrew's; Msida Saint-Joseph; Żejtun Corinthians
- Matches: 195
- Goals: 501 (2.57 per match)
- Top goalscorer: Andre Carlos Penha Da Costa (17 Goals)
- Biggest home win: Żebbuġ Rangers 6-0 Msida Saint-Joseph (17 March 2024); Melita 5-1 Pietà Hotspurs (27 April 2024)
- Biggest away win: Attard 0-6 Żebbuġ Rangers (7 April 2024)
- Highest scoring: Fgura United 4-4 Melita (17 December 2023)
- Longest winning run: Melita (7 Games)
- Longest unbeaten run: Senglea Athletic (12 Games)
- Longest winless run: Msida Saint-Joseph (13 Games)
- Longest losing run: Msida Saint-Joseph (11 Games)
- All statistics correct as of 5 May 2024.

The 2023–24 Maltese Challenge League (referred to as the BOV Challenge League for sponsorship reasons) is the second-level league football in Malta. It is the fourth season that the competition has been running in its present form.

The top two teams (Melita and Żabbar St. Patrick) were promoted to the 2024–25 Maltese Premier League. The bottom four teams (Msida Saint-Joseph and three others) will be relegated to the 2024–25 Maltese National Amateur League.

== Teams ==
The league consisted of sixteen teams; ten teams remaining from the previous season, four teams promoted from the 2022-23 Maltese National Amateur League, and two teams relegated from the 2022-23 Maltese Premier League.

=== Team changes ===
The following teams have changed divisions since the 2022–23 season:

==== To Maltese Challenge League ====
Promoted from Maltese National Amateur League

- Luqa St. Andrew's
- Msida Saint-Joseph
- Senglea Athletic
- Zabbar St. Patrick

Relegated from the Maltese Premier League

- Pietà Hotspurs
- Żebbuġ Rangers

==== From Maltese Challenge League ====
Promoted to the Maltese Premier League

- Sliema Wanderers
- Naxxar Lions

Relegated to Maltese National Amateur League

- Marsaskala
- Mqabba
- Mtarfa
- Qrendi
- San Gwann
- Vittoriosa Stars

Location of teams in 2023–24 Maltese Challenge League

Team	Location	Manager
Attard	Attard	(Malta) Robert Magro
Fgura United	Fgura	(Malta) Kevin Vella
Lija Athletic	Lija	(Malta) Joseph Galea
Luqa St. Andrew's	Luqa	(Malta) Edmond Lufi
Marsa	Marsa	(Nigeria) Orosco Anonam
Melita	San Ġiljan	(Malta) Clive Mizzi
Msida Saint-Joseph	Msida	(Malta) Neville Galea
Pietà Hotspurs	Pietà	(Malta) Manuel Caruana
Senglea Athletic	Senglea	(Malta) Liam Mangion
St. Andrews	St. Andrew's, Malta	(Montenegro) Vesko Petrovic
Swieqi United	Swieqi	(Argentina) Pablo Doffo
Tarxien Rainbows	Tarxien	(Malta) Jacques Scerri
Żabbar St. Patrick	Zabbar	(Argentina) Emilio Cornago San Pedro
Żebbuġ Rangers	Żebbuġ	(Malta) Rodney Bugeja
Żejtun Corinthians	Zejtun	(Malta) Ivan Casha
Żurrieq	Żurrieq	(Malta) Saviour Debono Grech

=== Kits ===
Team	Kit manufacturer	Shirt sponsor (front)	Shirt sponsor (back)	Shirt sponsor (sleeve)
Attard	Givova	Bilven Ltd, Searched		A to Z Electronics (Both)
Fgura United	Adidas	Fundazzjoni Sebħ, Trust Stamp, Euro Bridge, Iveco (Top Left)	EuroSport (Top), Rad Auto Dealer (Bottom)	Fundazzjoni Sebħ (Right), Hair Haven (Left)
Lija Athletic	Macron	Falzon Group Of Companies	TeamSport (Top), La Crema (Bottom)	
Luqa St. Andrew's	Macron	Seduta Construction		Bilon Service (Right)
Marsa	Legea	F Schembri		
Melita	Hummel	Atlas Insurance	Hub88 (Top), Burger King (Middle) Eurosport (Bottom)	I nouv (Right), VIBE (Left)
Msida Saint-Joseph	Legea	C.A.M.C. Security, MTZ Group (Top Left)	Sports Locker (Top), The Tub (Bottom)	Cuschieri Group (Left), KF Kebab (Right)
Pietà Hotspurs	Jartazi	Famalco.net, A1 Supplies, Xuereb Installation	Farstone Construction (Top)	
Senglea Athletic	Givova	Palumbo, AUM, JCJuc Ltd		
St. Andrews	Macron	Fiat, Frank Salt		atg (Left), Marsali (Right)
Swieqi United	Erima	Platin P Casino, BEHR	Eight Four Capital (Top)	
Tarxien Rainbows	Erreà	Cassar, Dee Spas	Cargo Nigel (Bottom)	AEN (Right)
Żabbar St. Patrick	Erreà	The Shoreline	DL Group (Top), Kristal (Bottom)	
Żebbuġ Rangers	Joma	The Convenience Shop, Coop Italia		
Żejtun Corinthians	Erreà	Inno-Hit		Magic Castle (Right)
Żurrieq	Erima	Trust Payment	Xace (Top), Corendion, D£, B.home (Bottom)	Tax ORB (Left), Firetech (Right)

=== Managerial changes ===
Team	Outgoing manager	Manner of departure	Date of vacancy	Position in table	Incoming manager	Date of appointment
Melita	(Malta) Saviour Debono Grech	End of Contract	24 April 2023	Pre-season	(Malta) Clive Mizzi	25 May 2023
Marsa	(Malta) Ryan Fenech	End of Caretaker	24 April 2023	Pre-season	(Nigeria) Orosco Anonam	15 May 2023
Żurrieq	(Malta) George Magri	Resign	29 April 2023	Pre-season	(Malta) Saviour Debono Grech	10 May 2023
Żabbar St. Patrick	(Argentina) Emilio Cornago	End of Caretaker	2 May 2023	Pre-season	(Malta) Joseph Spiteri	20 May 2023
Żebbuġ Rangers	(Malta) Brian Spiteri	End of Contract	3 May 2023	Pre-season	(Malta) Rodney Bugeja	19 May 2023
Pietà Hotspurs	(Malta) Rodney Bugeja	End of Contract	6 May 2023	Pre-season	(Malta) Manuel Caruana	26 May 2023
St. Andrews	(Malta) Brian Said	End of Contract	7 May 2023	Pre-season	(Malta) Ramon Zammit	13 May 2023
Żejtun Corinthians	(Nigeria) Orosco Anonam	End of Contract	15 May 2023	Pre-season	(Malta) Ivan Casha	29 May 2023
Swieqi United	(Malta) Stephen Damato	Signed by Sirens	24 May 2023	Pre-season	(Argentina) Pablo Doffo	26 May 2023
St. Andrews	(Malta) Ramon Zammit	Sacked	21 October 2023	13th	(Malta) Charles Muscat (Caretaker)	21 October 2023
Senglea Athletic	(Malta) Edgar Degabriele	Sacked	21 November 2023	10th	(Malta) Liam Mangion	30 November 2023
St. Andrews	(Malta) Charles Muscat	End of Caretaker	21 January 2024	15th	(Montenegro) Vesko Petrovic	21 January 2024

== Venues ==
On 29 January 2024. The Malta Football Association introduced another three stadiums Charles Abela Stadium, Luxol Stadium and Sirens Stadium due to the final fixture of the first round that played five matches at the same time.

2023–24 Maltese Challenge League is located in Malta	Pembroke	Mosta	San Pawl il-Baħar	Ta' Qali	Hamrun
2023–24 Maltese Challenge League is located in Malta	Luxol Stadium	Charles Abela Stadium	Sirens Stadium	Centenary Stadium	Victor Tedesco Stadium
2023–24 Maltese Challenge League is located in Malta	Capacity: 600	Capacity: 700	Capacity: 800	Capacity: 3,000	Capacity: 1,962

== Regular season ==
During the regular season, each team plays each other once (either at home or at away). The top six teams qualify for the Top Six, while the bottom ten teams qualify for the Play-Out.

=== League table ===
Pos	Team	Pld	W	D	L	GF	GA	GD	Pts	Qualification
1	Żabbar St. Patrick	15	10	3	2	21	9	+12	33	Qualification for the Top Six
2	Melita	15	9	4	2	32	21	+11	31	Qualification for the Top Six
3	Senglea Athletic	15	8	5	2	20	9	+11	29	Qualification for the Top Six
4	Marsa	15	8	4	3	32	17	+15	28	Qualification for the Top Six
5	Pietà Hotspurs	15	8	3	4	23	13	+10	27	Qualification for the Top Six
6	Żurrieq	15	8	3	4	18	17	+1	27	Qualification for the Top Six
7	Fgura United	15	8	2	5	32	25	+7	26	Qualification for the Play-Out
8	Lija Athletic	15	6	4	5	26	24	+2	22	Qualification for the Play-Out
9	Swieqi United	15	5	6	4	18	16	+2	21	Qualification for the Play-Out
10	Tarxien Rainbows	15	3	8	4	16	14	+2	17	Qualification for the Play-Out
11	Żejtun Corinthians	15	4	5	6	17	18	−1	17	Qualification for the Play-Out
12	Luqa St. Andrew's	15	4	4	7	21	24	−3	16	Qualification for the Play-Out
13	St. Andrews	15	3	2	10	14	28	−14	11	Qualification for the Play-Out
14	Żebbuġ Rangers	15	2	4	9	11	27	−16	10	Qualification for the Play-Out
15	Attard	15	1	5	9	14	33	−19	8	Qualification for the Play-Out
16	Msida Saint-Joseph	15	2	0	13	9	29	−20	6	Qualification for the Play-Out

Source: Malta Football Association
Rules for classification: 1) Points; 2) Play-offs (only if needed to decide champions or teams for relegation).

=== Results ===
Home \ Away	ATT	FGU	LJA	LQA	MSA	MEL	MSI	PIE	SEN	STA	SWQ	TAR	ZAB	ZEB	ZEJ	ZUR
Attard	—	1–2	2–3	—	0–6	—	—	2–1	—	1–1	—	—	0–3	—	1–1	—
Fgura United	—	—	3–0	—	1–2	4–4	—	0–4	—	2–0	1–3	—	2–3	—	—	—
Lija Athletic	—	—	—	3–1	—	2–3	3–2	—	0–2	—	2–2	0–0	—	—	4–1	4–0
Luqa St. Andrew's	4–1	0–3	—	—	—	—	—	—	—	2–2	2–2	4–2	1–3	—	2–0	—
Marsa	—	—	3–0	1–0	—	3–3	—	1–3	2–1	—	—	—	4–1	2–0	—	1–2
Melita	1–0	—	—	2–1	—	—	4–0	—	—	—	4–1	2–1	—	2–1	0–0	2–0
Msida Saint-Joseph	2–1	0–1	—	0–1	2–0	—	—	—	—	—	1–3	0–2	—	—	0–4	—
Pietà Hotspurs	—	—	2–2	1–0	—	2–2	1–0	—	0–1	0–1	—	—	—	2–0	—	2–0
Senglea Athletic	2–0	3–3	—	2–2	—	2–0	1–0	—	—	—	—	0–0	—	—	2–0	0–1
St. Andrews	—	—	1–2	—	1–4	0–3	3–2	—	0–1	—	—	0–3	—	3–1	—	2–3
Swieqi United	1–1	—	—	—	0–0	—	—	1–2	1–1	2–0	—	—	1–0	0–1	—	—
Tarxien Rainbows	4–2	0–1	—	—	3–3	—	—	0–1	—	—	0–0	—	—	—	0–0	0–0
Żabbar St. Patrick	—	—	1–0	—	—	4–0	1–0	1–0	0–0	1–0	—	1–1	—	1–0	—	—
Żebbuġ Rangers	1–1	1–3	1–1	1–1	—	—	3–0	—	0–2	—	—	0–0	—	—	—	0–5
Żejtun Corinthians	—	3–2	—	—	0–0	—	—	2–2	—	1–0	0–1	—	0–1	4–1	—	—
Żurrieq	1–1	1–4	—	1–0	—	—	1–0	—	—	—	1–0	—	0–0	—	2–1	—

Source: Malta Football Association
Legend: Blue = home team win; Yellow = draw; Red = away team win.
For upcoming matches, an "a" indicates there is an article about the rivalry between the two participants.

== Second phase ==
=== Top Six ===
The top six teams from the regular season face each other twice more (once at home and once away), with the top two teams earning promotion to the 2024–25 Maltese Premier League. Results from the regular season were carried over into this round.

==== League table ====
Pos	Team	Pld	W	D	L	GF	GA	GD	Pts	Promotion
1	Melita (C)	25	18	5	2	56	24	+32	59	Promotion to the 2024–25 Maltese Premier League
2	Żabbar St. Patrick (P)	25	15	6	4	38	20	+18	51	Promotion to the 2024–25 Maltese Premier League
3	Marsa	25	11	7	7	44	30	+14	40	
4	Pietà Hotspurs	25	11	5	9	35	31	+4	38	
5	Senglea Athletic	25	9	8	8	28	27	+1	35	
6	Żurrieq	25	10	5	10	27	36	−9	35	

Updated to match(es) played on 28 April 2024. Source: Malta Football Association
Rules for classification: 1) Points; 2) Play-offs (only if needed to decide champions).
(C) Champions; (P) Promoted

==== Results ====
Home \ Away	MSA	MEL	PIE	SEN	ZAB	ZUR
Marsa	—	0–4	3–0	4–1	1–3	0–0
Melita	1–0	—	5–1	2–1	1–1	5–0
Pietà Hotspurs	1–1	0–1	—	4–2	3–1	2–0
Senglea Athletic	0–0	0–1	1–0	—	0–0	0–3
Żabbar St. Patrick	2–0	0–2	1–1	3–2	—	2–0
Żurrieq	1–3	0–2	3–0	1–1	1–4	—

Updated to match(es) played on 7 April 2024. Source: Malta Football Association
Legend: Blue = home team win; Yellow = draw; Red = away team win.
For upcoming matches, an "a" indicates there is an article about the rivalry between the two participants.

=== Play-Out ===
The bottom ten teams from the regular season face each other for the second time (either at home or away), with the bottom four teams being relegated to the 2024–25 Maltese National Amateur League. Results from the regular season were carried over into this round.

==== League table ====
Pos	Team	Pld	W	D	L	GF	GA	GD	Pts	Relegation
1	Swieqi United	24	10	8	6	34	23	+11	38	
2	Fgura United	24	10	7	7	39	32	+7	37	
3	Lija Athletic	24	9	5	10	31	44	−13	32	
4	Tarxien Rainbows	24	7	10	7	30	15	+15	31	
5	Żebbuġ Rangers	24	8	5	11	36	34	+2	29	
6	St. Andrews (Note: St. Andrews and Luqa St. Andrew's finished equal on points, A play-off decider determines the loser will be Relegation to the 2024–25 Maltese National Amateur League.)	24	7	7	10	29	34	−5	28	
7	Luqa St. Andrew's (R)	24	7	7	10	32	40	−8	28	Relegation to the 2024–25 Maltese National Amateur League
8	Żejtun Corinthians (R)	24	6	9	9	23	24	−1	27	Relegation to the 2024–25 Maltese National Amateur League
9	Attard (R)	24	4	6	14	25	46	−21	18	Relegation to the 2024–25 Maltese National Amateur League
10	Msida Saint-Joseph (R)	24	2	2	20	16	53	−37	8	Relegation to the 2024–25 Maltese National Amateur League

Updated to match(es) played on 28 April 2024. Source: Malta Football Association
Rules for classification: 1) Points; 2) Play-offs (only if needed to decide teams for relegation).
(R) Relegated

==== Results ====
Home \ Away	ATT	FGU	LJA	LQA	MSI	STA	SWQ	TAR	ZEB	ZEJ
Attard	—	—	—	1–2	—	—	—	1–0	0–6	0–1
Fgura United	1–0	—	1–1	0–1	—	—	1–1	—	—	1–1
Lija Athletic	0–2	—	—	—	—	—	—	0–4	0–4	1–0
Luqa St. Andrew's	—	—	0–1	—	2–0	2–2	0–4	—	—	—
Msida Saint-Joseph	1–1	2–2	0–2	—	—	1–3	2–3	—	—	—
St. Andrews	2–1	0–0	5–0	—	—	—	0–0	1–0	—	—
Swieqi United	0–2	—	4–0	—	—	—	—	0–1	3–1	—
Tarxien Rainbows	—	0–1	—	3–3	3–1	—	—	—	3–1	0–0
Żebbuġ Rangers	—	1–0	—	4–0	6–0	1–1	—	—	—	1–0
Żejtun Corinthians	—	—	—	1–1	2–0	1–1	0–1	—	—	—

Updated to match(es) played on 26 April 2024. Source: Malta Football Association
Legend: Blue = home team win; Yellow = draw; Red = away team win.
For upcoming matches, an "a" indicates there is an article about the rivalry between the two participants.

=== Relegation tie-breaker ===
With both St. Andrews and Luqa St. Andrew's level on 28 points, a play-off match was conducted to the looser will be Relegation to the 2024–25 Maltese National Amateur League.

5 May 2024	St. Andrews	1–0 (a.e.t.)	Luqa St. Andrew's	Ta' Qali
15:00 CEST	Luke Anthony Borg (yellow card) 51'; Clyde Cumbo (yellow card) 68'; Luke Grech (yellow card) 70'; Matthew Muscat (yellow card) 79'; Brayan Samuel Nyetam Junior 118'		Omar Khatib (yellow card) 84'; Alan Abdel Rahman (yellow card) 86'; Fabien Lufi (red card)	Stadium: Centenary Stadium; Referee: Daniel Portelli

== Season statistics ==
=== Scoring ===
==== Top scorers ====
As of 28 April 2024

Rank	Player	Club	Goals
1	(Brazil) Andre Carlos Penha Da Costa	Melita	17
2	(Argentina) Augusto Rene' Caseres	Marsa	13
2	(Colombia) Duvan Mosquera Torres	Zebbug Rangers	13
4	(Albania) Bledi Alla	Attard	12
4	(Nigeria) Ofufu Ibeh	Fgura United	12
6	(Colombia) Camilo Andres Sanchez Gonzales	Luqa St. Andrews	11
7	(Albania) Erjon Beu	Lija Athletic	10
7	(Malta) Alan Abdel Rahman	Luqa St. Andrews	10
7	(Brazil) David Oliveira Souza	Zabbar St.Patrick	10
10	(Colombia) Johan Alberto Castano	Fgura United	9
10	(Brazil) Pavlidis Claudio Antunes	Pieta Hotspurs	9
10	(Portugal) Ivan Sousa Flora Francisco	Zurrieq	9

==== Hat-tricks ====
Player	For	Against	Result	Stadium	Date
(Brazil) Andre Carlos Penha Da Costa	Melita	Msida Saint-Joseph	4-0 (H)	Victor Tedesco Stadium, Hamrun	1 October 2023
(Argentina) Santiago Fabian Moracci	Tarxien Rainbows	Attard	4-2 (H)	Centenary Stadium, Ta' Qali	22 October 2023
(Argentina) Augusto Rene' Caseres	Marsa	Attard	6-0 (A)	Victor Tedesco Stadium, Hamrun	4 November 2023
(Portugal) Ivan Sousa Flora Francisco	Żurrieq	St. Andrews	3-2 (A)	Centenary Stadium, Ta' Qali	2 December 2023
(Brazil) Pavlidis Claudio Antunes	Pieta Hotspurs	Marsa	3-1 (A)	Centenary Stadium, Ta' Qali	10 December 2023
(Brazil) Andre Carlos Penha Da Costa^{4}	Melita	Fgura United	4-4 (A)	Centenary Stadium, Ta' Qali	17 December 2023
(Argentina) Augusto Rene' Caseres	Marsa	St. Andrews	4-1 (A)	Victor Tedesco Stadium, Hamrun	27 January 2024
(Trinidad and Tobago) Rundell Winchester	Tarxien Rainbows	Lija Athletic	4-0 (A)	Victor Tedesco Stadium, Hamrun	11 February 2024
(Venezuela) Donys Aldair Quintero Maldonado	Marsa	Senglea Athletic	4-1 (H)	Centenary Stadium, Ta' Qali	6 April 2024
(Malta) Johann Bezzina	Żebbuġ Rangers	Attard	6-0 (A)	Victor Tedesco Stadium, Hamrun	7 April 2024
(Brazil) David Oliveira Souza	Żabbar St. Patrick	Żurrieq	4-1 (A)	Centenary Stadium, Ta' Qali	21 April 2024
(Malta) William James England	St. Andrews	Lija Athletic	5-0 (H)	Sirens Stadium, San Pawl il-Baħar	28 April 2024

Notes

^{4} Player scored 4 goals

=== Clean sheets ===
Rank	Player	Club	Clean sheets
1	(Malta) Matthew Grech	Żabbar St. Patrick	13
2	(Malta) Gosef Mizzi	Melita	12
2	(Malta) Glenn Zammit	Senglea Athletic	12
4	(Malta) Andreas Vella	Tarxien Rainbows	11
5	(Malta) Jamie Azzopardi	Zebbug Rangers	9
6	(Malta) Christopher Farrugia	Marsa	8
6	(Malta) Frederick Tabone	Zejtun Corinthians	8
8	(Malta) Reeves Cini	Pieta Hotspurs	7
8	(Malta) Jean Claude Debattista	Swieqi United	7
8	(Malta) Ryan Caruana	Zurrieq	7

=== Discipline ===
==== Player ====
- Most yellow cards: 12
  - (Colombia) Camilo Del Castillo Escobar (Attard)
- Most red cards: 2
  - (Brazil) Lucas Vinicius Viana Prati (Lija Athletic)
  - (Malta) Josmar Galea (Żejtun Corinthians)

==== Club ====
- Most yellow cards: 63
  - Swieqi United
  - Żurrieq
- Most red cards: 6
  - Lija Athletic
