= 2021–22 Maltese Challenge League =

Maltese Challenge League
- Season: 2021–22
- Dates: 10 September 2021 – 23 April 2022
- Champions: Żebbuġ Rangers
- Promoted: Marsaxlokk; Pietà Hotspurs; Żebbuġ Rangers
- Relegated: Luqa St. Andrew's; Mġarr United; Pembroke Athleta; Rabat Ajax F.C. Senglea Athletic; St. George's
- All statistics correct as of 24 April 2022.

The 2021–22 Maltese Challenge League (referred to as the BOV Challenge League for sponsorship reasons) was the second-level league football in Malta. It was the second season that the competition ran in its present form.

Following the decision of the Maltese Football Association Executive Committee, the teams that had finished in the promotion and relegation places in the previous Challenge League season would remain in the Challenge League in the 2021-22 season (with the exception of Qormi, due to less than 75% of the matches having been completed in the competition. Relegation from the Premier League and promotion from the National Amateur League remained in place due to these competitions being adequately completed. This season therefore saw twenty-two teams competed rather than the sixteen that had been originally expected. This took place within two groups on eleven teams with the top two clubs from either group earning promotion to the Premier League. The six teams to finish in the bottom three places of both groups relegated to the National Amateur League the following season.

== Teams ==
Location of teams in 2021–22 Maltese Premier League

Twenty-two teams competed in the league, which included the four teams promoted from the Amateur League and four teams relegated from the Premier League. The top two teams from either group achieved automatic promotion with the end of season leaders of the two groups meeting in a playoff to decide who would be the champion for 2021–22. The bottom three clubs of both groups automatically relegated without any playoffs.

Team	Location
Fgura United	Fgura
Lija Athletic	Lija
Luqa St. Andrew's	Luqa
Marsa	Marsa
Marsaxlokk	Marsaxlokk
Melita	San Ġiljan
Mġarr United	Mġarr
Mqabba	Mqabba
Naxxar Lions	Naxxar
Pembroke Athleta	Pembroke
Pietà Hotspurs	Pietà
Qrendi	Qrendi
Rabat Ajax F.C.	Rabat
San Ġwann	San Ġwann
Senglea Athletic	Senglea
St. Andrews	St. Andrew's, Malta
St. George's	Cospicua
Swieqi United	Swieqi
Tarxien Rainbows	Tarxien
Vittoriosa Stars	Birgu
Żebbuġ Rangers	Żebbuġ
Żejtun Corinthians	Żejtun

== League tables ==
=== Challenge League Group A ===
Pos	Team	Pld	W	D	L	GF	GA	GD	Pts	Qualification or relegation
1	Pembroke Athleta (Note: On 20 May 2022 Pembroke Athleta asked the Malta Football Association if they want to play in the National Amateur League instead of Premier League due to financing problems.) (R)	20	14	6	0	49	16	+33	48	Relegation to the 2022-23 Maltese National Amateur League
2	Marsaxlokk (P)	20	13	2	5	40	22	+18	41	Promotion to the 2022–23 Maltese Premier League
3	Żejtun Corinthians	20	12	4	4	44	24	+20	40	
4	Naxxar Lions	20	12	1	7	37	22	+15	37	
5	Melita	20	10	3	7	28	22	+6	33	
6	San Ġwann	20	8	6	6	38	22	+16	30	
7	Lija Athletic	20	8	4	8	39	37	+2	28	
8	Mqabba	20	5	5	10	29	41	−12	20	
9	Vittoriosa Stars (Note: Vittoriosa Stars were originally relegated to National Amateur League. On 16 June 2022 the Malta Football Association decided that they would play in the Maltese Challenge League instead of Pembroke Athleta.)	20	5	1	14	23	61	−38	16	~~Relegation to the 2022-23 Maltese National Amateur League~~
10	Rabat Ajax (R)	20	3	4	13	20	42	−22	13	Relegation to the 2022-23 Maltese National Amateur League
11	St. George's (R)	20	1	2	17	13	51	−38	5	Relegation to the 2022-23 Maltese National Amateur League

Updated to match(es) played on 10 April 2022. Source:
Rules for classification: 1) Points
(P) Promoted; (R) Relegated

=== Challenge League Group B ===
Pos	Team	Pld	W	D	L	GF	GA	GD	Pts	Qualification or relegation
1	Żebbuġ Rangers (P)	20	14	3	3	46	15	+31	45	Promotion to the 2022–23 Maltese Premier League
2	Pietà Hotspurs (P)	20	12	4	4	39	19	+20	40	Promotion to the 2022–23 Maltese Premier League
3	Tarxien Rainbows	20	10	8	2	45	24	+21	38	
4	Marsa	20	10	5	5	35	22	+13	33 (Note: Marsa received a 2 point deduction after their player assaulted a match official in a match against Pietà Hotspurs.)	
5	Fgura United	20	9	4	7	35	27	+8	31	
6	St. Andrews	20	8	4	8	36	30	+6	28	
7	Qrendi	20	7	3	10	30	37	−7	24	
8	Swieqi United	20	5	9	6	21	29	−8	24	
9	Senglea Athletic (R)	20	4	3	13	24	50	−26	15	Relegation to the 2022-23 Maltese National Amateur League
10	Mġarr United (R)	20	3	5	12	11	36	−25	14	Relegation to the 2022-23 Maltese National Amateur League
11	Luqa St. Andrew's (R)	20	2	4	14	9	42	−33	10	Relegation to the 2022-23 Maltese National Amateur League

Updated to match(es) played on 30 January 2022. Source:
Rules for classification: 1) Points
(P) Promoted; (R) Relegated

== Results ==
=== Challenge League Group A results ===
Home \ Away	LIJ	MXK	MEL	MQA	NXL	PEM	RAB	SĠW	STG	VST	ŻEJ
Lija Athletic	—	0–1	1–2	4–3	1–3	1–1	3–0	2–2	2–0	4–0	2–1
Marsaxlokk	3–4	—	0–2	3–1	3–0	2–2	1–1	3–2	1–0	6–0	1–3
Melita	2–1	1–0	—	0–0	0–2	1–3	0–0	0–2	3–0	3–0	1–3
Mqabba	1–1	0–2	3–2	—	1–1	2–3	1–2	0–4	4–1	2–1	2–4
Naxxar Lions	2–0	1–3	0–2	5–0	—	1–2	1–0	0–3	1–0	3–0	1–2
Pembroke Athleta	5–1	1–0	4–1	3–0	1–0	—	3–0	1–1	2–0	1–0	2–2
Rabat Ajax	1–3	1–2	1–2	2–2	0–2	0–2	—	2–7	1–1	3–0	0–2
San Ġwann	4–1	0–1	0–0	0–2	0–1	2–2	3–1	—	4–0	3–2	0–0
St. George's	2–2	1–3	0–2	1–4	0–1	0–6	0–3	2–0	—	1–2	3–5
Vittoriosa Stars	1–5	1–3	0–3	1–1	2–9	1–4	3–2	2–1	3–1	—	1–4
Żejtun Corinthians	3–1	1–2	2–1	1–0	2–3	1–1	4–0	0–0	2–0	2–3	—

Updated to match(es) played on 10 April 2022. Source: Malta Football Association
Legend: Blue = home team win; Yellow = draw; Red = away team win.

=== Challenge League Group B results ===
Home \ Away	FGU	LSA	MSA	MĠA	PHS	QND	SEN	STA	SWI	TAR	ŻEB
Fgura United	—	1–1	1–2	2–0	0–1	5–1	2–2	2–5	0–0	1–3	3–0
Luqa St. Andrew's	1–2	—	0–2	1–1	2–0	0–2	0–2	0–2	1–0	0–2	0–8
Marsa	1–1	1–1	—	1–0	1–2	1–0	5–0	2–0	2–2	1–0	1–3
Mġarr United	1–0	1–0	0–2	—	0–2	2–2	1–0	1–4	1–2	0–4	0–4
Pietà Hotspurs	1–3	5–0	2–0	3–0	—	3–2	1–0	3–1	3–1	1–3	0–1
Qrendi	1–2	2–1	0–4	3–1	1–1	—	2–3	3–2	1–1	1–2	2–0
Senglea Athletic	2–3	1–0	3–5	0–0	0–6	2–3	—	2–1	0–1	1–6	0–3
St. Andrews	1–2	3–1	1–1	2–0	0–0	2–0	3–2	—	2–2	1–3	0–1
Swieqi United	1–0	0–0	2–1	1–1	2–2	1–3	1–0	1–4	—	2–2	0–3
Tarxien Rainbows	1–4	3–0	1–1	3–1	2–2	2–0	3–3	2–2	0–0	—	1–1
Żebbuġ Rangers	2–1	4–0	3–1	0–0	0–1	2–1	4–1	0–2	3–1	2–2	—

Updated to match(es) played on 10 April 2022. Source: Malta Football Association
Legend: Blue = home team win; Yellow = draw; Red = away team win.

== Championship play-offs ==
=== Championship final ===
23 April 2022	Pembroke Athleta	1–1 (a.e.t.) (3–5 p)	Żebbuġ Rangers	Ta' Qali
15:00 CEST	Erikys da Silva Ferreira 11'		Shalon Diacono 79'	Stadium: Centenary Stadium
