= 2017–18 Maltese Futsal League =

Maltese Futsal League
- Season: 2017–18
- Country: Malta
- Champions: Valletta FC Futsal Club
- UEFA Futsal Champions League: Valletta
- Biggest win: Luxol 24-1 Junior College
- Highest scoring: Luxol 24-1 Junior College

The 2017-18 Maltese Futsal Premier League is the 8th season of the Maltese Gatorade League, the top Maltese league for futsal clubs, since its establishment in 2011. It is also 19th season of the futsal championship in Malta, since the beginning of organized futsal in the country in 1999.

== Regular season ==
The first round of the Gatorade Futsal League concluded on 18 December 2017, with Luxol recording a comprehensive 24–1 victory over bottom side Junior College, while Tarxien JMI defeated Qormi 9–1. Valletta finished the first round with 33 points, three ahead of Luxol.

The decisive series of matches occurred when Valletta won all eleven matches, including derbies against Ħamrun Tre Angeli (5–3) and Luxol St. Andrews (4–2).

Pos	Team	Pld	W	D	L	GF	GA	GD	Pts	Qualification
1	Valletta	11	11	0	0	81	15	+66	33	Qualification for the Elite group
2	Luxol	11	10	0	1	110	23	+87	30	Qualification for the Elite group
3	Swieqi	11	8	1	2	62	34	+28	25	Qualification for the Elite group
4	Ħamrun	11	7	1	3	90	30	+60	22	Qualification for the Elite group
5	Mriehel ESS	11	7	0	4	61	40	+21	21	Qualification for the Elite group
6	University of Malta	11	6	2	3	76	44	+32	20	Qualification for the Division one
7	Pietà Nordiska	11	5	0	6	52	56	−4	15	Qualification for the Division one
8	Tarxien JMI	11	4	0	7	56	53	+3	12	Qualification for the Division one
9	Qormi	11	3	0	8	34	65	−31	9	Qualification for the Division one
10	Marsascala	11	2	0	9	20	74	−54	6	Qualification for the Division one
11	Swieqi U21	11	1	0	10	31	100	−69	3	Qualification for the Division one
12	Junior College	11	0	0	11	19	159	−140	0	Qualification for the Division one

Updated to match(es) played on unknown. Source: Futsal Malta Association

== Elite Group ==
Pos	Team	Pld	W	D	L	GF	GA	GD	Pts
1	Luxol	15	14	0	1	131	28	+103	42
2	Valletta	15	14	0	1	98	25	+73	42
3	Hamrun	15	9	1	5	112	51	+61	28
4	Swieqi	15	8	1	6	71	59	+12	25
5	Mriehel	15	8	0	7	69	55	+14	24

Updated to match(es) played on unknown. Source: Futsal Malta Association

=== Elite First Place Decider ===
After regular 11 rounds, Valletta fished at first place with the same number of points as Luxol, but with a better goal score. The first place was determined after the first place decider held on February 27, 2018. Luxol won 2-1 with Mark Zammit and Giancarlo Sammut among the scorers. Shawn Vella scored the only goal for Valletta.

== Division One ==
Pos	Team	Pld	W	D	L	GF	GA	GD	Pts
1	University of Malta	17	10	2	5	110	62	+48	32
2	Tarxien Rainbows	17	10	0	7	96	73	+23	30
3	Pietà Nordiska	17	9	0	8	76	74	+2	27
4	Qormi	17	7	0	10	57	82	−25	21
5	Marsascala	17	3	0	14	41	104	−63	9
6	Swieqi U21	17	3	0	14	49	120	−71	9
7	Junior College	17	0	0	17	27	204	−177	0

Updated to match(es) played on unknown. Source: Futsal Malta Association

=== Division One Playoffs ===
Semifinals
3	Mrieħel ESS	2
4	Pietà Nordiska	1
1	University	4 (1p)
2	Tarxien	4 (3p)

Final
1	Mrieħel ESS	8
2	Tarxien	7

== Playoffs ==
The 2018 Maltese Futsal Premier League Playoffs began on March 2, 2018. The season ended on March 23, 2018, with the final between two regular stage best teams, Luxol and Valletta.

Semifinals
3	Valletta	5	4
4	Hamrun	1	2
1	Luxol	6	4
2	Swieqi	1	1

Final
1	Luxol	1	2 (4p)
2	Valletta	5	2(5p)
