= 2018–19 Maltese Futsal Knockout Cup =

2018–19 Maltese futsal competition

Tournament details
- Host country: Malta
- Dates: 6 December 2018 - 12 Aprile 2019
- Teams: 10

Final positions
- Champions: Luxol
- Runners-up: Valleta

2018–19 Maltese Futsal Knockout Cup was a futsal competition in Malta, organized in a single-elimination format. Ten teams entered the tournament, which began on 6 December 2018 and concluded with the final on 12 April 2019. Luxol claimed the title after a 6–2 victory over Valleta in the final.

== Preliminary Round ==
The draws of the 2018–19 Maltese Futsal Knock-Out competition were made on 6 December 2018. The two Preliminary Round ties were contested by the teams occupying the bottom four places at the end of the first round of the 2018–19 Maltese Futsal League, with the winners progressing to the main round. Pietà Hotspurs and Luxol SA Futsal U-19 advanced to the main round.

Team 1	Score	Team 2
Luxol SA Futsal U-19	?	Swieqi Utd Futsal U-21
Pietà Hotspurs	?	UOM Futsal Academy

== Quarter-Finals ==
Team 1	Score	Team 2
Pietà Hotspurs	4–2	University of Malta
Swieqi United Futsal	4–5	Luxol
Luxol SA Futsal U-19	0–17	Valletta
Birkirkara	9–7	Tarxien Rainbows

== Semi-Finals ==
Luxol and Valletta gained promotion to the Final.

Team 1	Score	Team 2
Pietà Hotspurs	0–9	Luxol
Birkirkara	3–5	Valletta

== Final ==
After winning the championship, Luxol ended the season in style as they won the 2018–19 Futsal Cup thanks to a 6–2 win over Valletta in an entertaining final on 12 April 2019.

Team 1	Score	Team 2
Luxol St Andrews	6–2	Valletta

== External sources ==
- FutsalPlanet – Competitions overview
