= 2017–18 Maltese Futsal Knockout Cup =

2017–18 Maltese futsal competition

Tournament details
- Host country: Malta
- Dates: 7 September 2017 - 14 April 2018
- Teams: 12
- Venue(s): Corradino Pavillion, Paola, Malta

Final positions
- Champions: University of Malta Futsal
- Runners-up: Luxol

2017–18 Maltese Futsal Knockout Cup was a futsal competition in Malta, organized in a single-elimination format. Fifteen teams entered the tournament, which began on 7 September 2017 and concluded with the final on 26 June 2018. University of Malta Futsal claimed the title after a 5–2 victory over Luxol in the final.

== Preliminary Round ==
The preliminary round of the Knock-Out Competition featured first-round matches in which Pieta, University of Malta, Marsascala, and Tarxien JMI joined the seeded teams Luxol, Valletta, Ħamrun, and Swieqi.

Team 1	Score	Team 2
University of Malta	6–4	Mriehel ESS
Tarxien JMI	8–2	Swieqi U21
Marsascala	5–2	Qormi
Pieta	w./o.	Junior College

== Quarter-Finals ==
Team 1	Score	Team 2
University of Malta	?	Valletta

== Semi-Finals ==
Team 1	Score	Team 2
University of Malta	5–2	Swieqi
Luxol St Andrews	6–2	Ħamrun Tre Angeli

== Final ==
Team 1	Score	Team 2
University of Malta	5–2	Luxol St Andrews

== External sources ==
- FutsalPlanet – Competitions overview
