= 2020–21 Maltese National Amateur League =

1st season of the Maltese National Amateur League

Maltese National Amateur League
- Season: 2020–21
- Dates: 17 October 2020 – 6 March 2021
- Champions: Luqa St. Andrew's
- Promoted: Melita; Mġarr United; Rabat Ajax
- Matches: 151
- Goals: 491 (3.25 per match)
- All statistics correct as of 7 March 2021.

The 2020–21 Maltese National Amateur League (referred to, for sponsorship reasons, as the BOV National Amateur League), was the third level league football in Malta. This was the first season since the unification of both the Second and Third Divisions into the three group Amateur League system.

== Teams ==
Twenty-two teams competed in the league. These were split into three groups, two groups of seven and one of eight.

Team	Location	Stadium	Capacity
Attard	Attard	Sirens Stadium	1,500
Birżebbuġa	Birżebbuġa	Centenary Stadium	2,000
Dingli Swallows	Ħad-Dingli	Tartarni Ground	500
Għargħur	Għargħur	Għargħur Stadium	800
Għaxaq	Għaxaq	Għaxaq Stadium	300
Kalkara	Kalkara	Luxol Sports Ground	800
Kirkop United	Ħal Kirkop	Centenary Stadium	2,000
Luqa St. Andrew's	Luqa	Luxol Sports Ground	800
Marsaskala	Marsaskala	Luxol Sports Ground	800
Mdina Knights	Mdina Knights	Centenary Stadium	2,000
Melita	San Ġiljan	Gianni Bencini Ground	500
Mellieħa	Mellieħa	Mellieħa Sports Complex	400
Mġarr United	Mġarr	Mġarr Stadium	500
Msida St. Joseph	Msida	Victor Tedesco Stadium	6,000
Mtarfa	Mtarfa	Mtarfa Ground	150
Rabat Ajax	Rabat	Rabat Ajax Football Ground	700
Siġġiewi	Siġġiewi	Siġġiewi Ground	240
St. Venera	Santa Venera	Santa Venera Lightnings Training Centre	800
Ta' Xbiex	Ta' Xbiex		
Xgħajra Tornados	Xgħajra	Xgħajra Tornados Ground	200
Żabbar St. Patrick	Ħaż-Żabbar	Il-Foss	1000
Żurrieq	Żurrieq	Żurrieq Football Ground	100

== League stage ==
=== Group A ===
Pos	Team	Pld	W	D	L	GF	GA	GD	Pts	Qualification or relegation
1	Mġarr United (P)	14	11	2	1	43	10	+33	35	Promotion to the 2021–22 Maltese Challenge League
2	Żurrieq	14	9	3	2	30	15	+15	30	Qualification for the promotion play-offs
3	Marsaskala	14	7	6	1	27	15	+12	27	Qualification for the promotion play-offs
4	Mellieħa	14	6	4	4	20	17	+3	22	Qualification for the promotion play-offs 1st round
5	Birżebbuġa	14	5	2	7	23	23	0	17	
6	Għargħur	14	3	3	8	20	28	−8	12	
7	Ta' Xbiex	14	2	2	10	9	38	−29	8	
8	Għaxaq	14	0	4	10	7	33	−26	4	

Updated to match(es) played on 14 February 2021. Source:
Rules for classification: 1) Points; 2) Goal difference
(P) Promoted

=== Group B ===
Pos	Team	Pld	W	D	L	GF	GA	GD	Pts	Qualification or relegation
1	Luqa St. Andrew's (C, P)	12	7	4	1	26	10	+16	25	Promotion to the 2021–22 Maltese Challenge League
2	Msida St. Joseph	12	6	3	3	24	17	+7	21	Qualification for the promotion play-offs
3	Siġġiewi	12	6	2	4	17	12	+5	20	Qualification for the promotion play-offs
4	Rabat Ajax (O, P)	12	4	6	2	16	16	0	18	Qualification for the promotion play-offs
5	Mtarfa	12	4	3	5	14	19	−5	15	
6	Żabbar St. Patrick	12	2	4	6	12	24	−12	10	
7	Mdina Knights	12	0	4	8	11	22	−11	4	

Updated to match(es) played on 14 February 2021. Source:
Rules for classification: 1) Points; 2) Goal difference
(C) Champions; (O) Play-off winners; (P) Promoted

=== Group C ===
Pos	Team	Pld	W	D	L	GF	GA	GD	Pts	Qualification or relegation
1	Melita (P)	12	12	0	0	38	8	+30	36	Promotion to the 2021–22 Maltese Challenge League
2	Attard	12	8	1	3	37	15	+22	25	Qualification for the promotion play-offs
3	Kirkop United	12	6	2	4	25	20	+5	20	Qualification for the promotion play-offs
4	Xgħajra Tornados	12	6	0	6	26	25	+1	18	Qualification for the promotion play-offs 1st round
5	Kalkara	12	4	1	7	16	27	−11	13	
6	Dingli Swallows	12	2	3	7	15	29	−14	9	
7	St. Venera	12	0	1	11	5	38	−33	1	

Updated to match(es) played on 14 February 2021. Source:
Rules for classification: 1) Points; 2) Goal difference
(P) Promoted

== Promotion play-offs ==
=== Bracket ===
First Round
Mellieħa	1
Xgħajra Tornados	2

Quarter-finals
Attard (p)	1 (4)
Xgħajra Tornados	1 (3)
Żurrieq	1
Kirkop United	2
Msida St. Joseph	0
Rabat Ajax	1
Marsaskala	2
Siġġiewi	1

Semi-finals
Attard	1
Kirkop United	2
Rabat Ajax	2
Marsaskala	1

Final
Kirkop United	1
Rabat Ajax	2

=== 1st round ===
24 February 2021	Mellieħa	1 - 2	Xgħajra Tornados

=== Quarter-finals ===
27 February 2021	Attard	(4) 1 - 1 (3)	Xgħajra Tornados

27 February 2021	Żurrieq	1 - 2	Kirkop United

28 February 2021	Msida St. Joseph	0 - 1	Rabat Ajax

28 February 2021	Marsaskala	2 - 1	Siġġiewi

=== Semi-finals ===
4 March 2021	Attard	1 - 2	Kirkop United

4 March 2021	Rabat Ajax	2 - 1	Marsaskala

=== Play-offs Final ===
6 March 2021	Kirkop United	1 - 2	Rabat Ajax

== Championship play-offs ==
Pos	Team	Pld	W	D	L	GF	GA	GD	Pts	Qualification
1	Luqa St. Andrew's (C)	2	2	0	0	5	2	+3	6	Champions and Promotion to the 2021–22 Maltese Challenge League
2	Melita (P)	2	0	1	1	2	3	−1	1	Promotion to the 2021–22 Maltese Challenge League
3	Mġarr United (P)	2	0	1	1	2	4	−2	1	Promotion to the 2021–22 Maltese Challenge League

Updated to match(es) played on 7 March 2021. Source:
Rules for classification: 1) Points; 2) Goal difference
(C) Champions; (P) Promoted

27 February 2021	Mġarr United	1 - 1	Melita	Ħamrun
	Zammit (yellow card) 25'; Saliba 29'; Grima (yellow card) 53'; Doric 68'	Report	Abela (yellow card) 38'; Tergougoff 59'; Rizzo (yellow card) 90'	Stadium: Victor Tedesco Stadium

2 March 2021	Luqa St. Andrew's	3 - 1	Mġarr United	Ta' Qali
	Vella 65' (pen.), 80' (pen.); Nwaogu (yellow card) 83', (goal) 92'; Degiorgio (yellow card) 87'; Cassar (yellow card) 92'	Report	Doric 11'; Saliba (yellow card) 44'; Davies (yellow card) 80'; Zammit (yellow card) 80'	Stadium: Centenary Stadium

6 March 2021	Melita	1 - 2	Luqa St. Andrew's	Ħamrun
	Camilleri (yellow card) 32'; Cachia (yellow card) 32', (goal) 49' (pen.); Omondi (yellow card) 45'; Abela (yellow card) 90+2'; Rizzo (yellow card) 90+4'	Report	Vella 34' (pen.), (yellow card) 90+2'; Lufi (yellow card) 53'; Nwaogu 77', (yellow card) 86'; Grima (yellow card) 78'; Abdel (yellow card) 84'	Stadium: Victor Tedesco Stadium
