= 2018–19 Maltese Futsal League =

Maltese Futsal League
- Season: 2018–19
- Country: Malta

The 2018–19 Maltese Futsal Premier League is the 8th season of the Maltese Futsal League, the top Maltese league for futsal clubs, since its establishment in 2011. It is also 20th season of the futsal championship in Malta, since the beginning of organized futsal in the country in 1999.

It is a transitory season in the handover between the Futsal Malta Association and the Malta Football Association with regards to operation of the league.

== Teams ==
October 1 marked the start of the championship, with the first round played on a round-robin basis before the ten teams were split into two categories — the top six advanced to the Elite Futsal League, while the remaining four competed in the Futsal League.

Teams as of August 2018:

Team	Locality
Birkirkara Futsal	Birkirkara
Luxol Futsal	St. Andrew's, Swieqi
Luxol Futsal Under 19	St. Andrew's, Swieqi
Pietà Hotspurs Futsal	Pietà, Malta
Swieqi United Futsal	Swieqi
Swieqi Utd Futsal Under 21	Swieqi
Tarxien Rainbows Futsal	Tarxien
University of Malta	University of Malta, Msida
UM Futsal Academy	University of Malta, Msida
Valletta FC Futsal Club	Valletta

== Transfers ==
Pos.	Player	Moving from	Moving to
Sweeper	(Malta) Andrea Farrugia	University of Malta	(Malta) Swieqi United
Pivot	(Malta) Leo Muscat	University of Malta	(Malta) Swieqi United
Winger	(Malta) Rodney Debono	University of Malta	(Malta) Swieqi United
Goalkeeper	(Malta) Dylan Cacciattolo	University of Malta	(Malta) Swieqi United
Winger	(Serbia) Dušan Rakić	University of Malta	(Malta) Swieqi United
Winger	(Malta) Alistair Scerri	University of Malta	(Malta) Tarxien Rainbows
Winger	(Spain) José María Aguilera Castellano	University of Malta	(Malta) Tarxien Rainbows
Goalkeeper	(Malta) Matthew Gatt	University of Malta	(Malta) Birkirkara
Sweeper	(Malta) Gary Inguanez	University of Malta	(Malta) Birkirkara
Winger	(Malta) Paul Scerri	University of Malta	(Malta) Pietà Hotspurs Futsal
Winger	(Slovenia) Nermin Hasanbegović	University of Malta	(Belgium) FS Gelko Hasselt
Winger	(Malta) Shawn Deguara	University of Malta	(Malta) Valletta
Winger	(Malta) Ryan Xuereb	(Malta) Swieqi United	(Malta) Birkirkara
Pivot	(Malta) Glenn Bonello	(Malta) Luxol	(Malta) Birkirkara
Sweeper	(Malta) Jason Mifsud	(Malta) Ħamrun (defunct)	(Malta) Birkirkara
Winger	(Malta) Aidan Micallef	(Malta) Swieqi United	(Malta) Luxol
Winger	(Brazil) Rogério dos Santos Filho	(Malta) Luxol	(Cyprus) Omonia Futsal
Winger	(Italy) Daniele Degennaro	(Malta) Ħamrun (defunct)	University of Malta
Goalkeeper	(Malta) Martin Attard	(Malta) Swieqi United Under 21	University of Malta
Goalkeeper	(Malta) Neil Marlow	(Malta) Swieqi United Under 21	University of Malta
Winger	(Malta) Cleaven Portelli	(Malta) unattached	University of Malta
Winger	(Malta) Clive Aquilina	(Malta) unattached	University of Malta
