= Leopold Drucker =

Austrian footballer (1903–1988)

Leopold Drucker (22 February 1903 – 25 February 1988) was an Austrian international football player and coach who played as a midfielder.

== Biography ==
Drucker was born in Vienna, Austria-Hungary. He made his debut for the youth team of Hakoah Vienna (Hebrew for the Force, a Jewish multisports club in Vienna) and moved to the first team, then playing in the Austrian second division. His first match in the first division came in December 1920 with the Hakoah first team, who had just been promoted. He marked his appearance with a goal. However, he continued to play sporadically for the first team, more often used as a reserve. Therefore, he decided to move clubs, and left for FAC, Floridsdorfer AC who had just been relegated to the second division. The objective was for the team to be immediately re-promoted to the first division, and the following season, Floridsdorfer returned to the elite. Drucker was one of the key players for the team, playing almost every game in the victorious 1925–1926 season in the first division. During this season, he played twice for the Vienna city team, against Kraków in September 1925 and Bratislava in March 1926.

He rejoined Hakoah Vienna the following season. In 1926, during a very successful club tour to the United States, he received an offer to play in the ASL, the American Soccer League. He signed for the Brooklyn Wanderers in New York. He played two seasons at the club. In 1928, there was a split with the creation of a rival league in the ESL. Drucker left to play for the newly created New York Hakoah (also known as the Hakoah All-Stars) where he rejoined his former teammates from Hakoah Vienna. With the club, he won the US Open Cup. Drucker played 136 matches in the ASL.

In 1931, Leopold Drucker moved back to his home club, Hakoah Vienna. In July 1932, he won his first cap for the Austria national team in a 4-3 win against Sweden in Stockholm. While the newspapers reported on an excellent performance by Drucker, this was his only international cap, possibly due to the political situation at the time. Drucker was the only Hakoah player to play for the Wunderteam, the name given to the brilliant Austria national team of the 1920s–1930s.

In 1933, he left Hakoah for the third time, and after a brief spell at FAC - rejoined his former coach at Hakoah, and former Austrian international, Vinzenz Dittrich, at Olympique de Marseille. He also played with his former teammate Jószef Eisenhoffer. During the 1933–34 season, Drucker played 16 matches in the French Championship and played in the final of the Coupe de France, losing 2–1 to FC Sète.

At the end of the season, he left for Malta, which he knew through a tournament with FAC. In the following years, Drucker was a player and coach for Floriana FC, St. George's FC and Melita FC, leading the latter to the 1938–39 Maltese FA Trophy, the greatest honour in the club's history to date. After the outbreak of the Second World War, he moved to Palestine, where he played and coached in Jerusalem. After the war, he moved to New York, where in 1947, he worked for Athletic Club Hakoah.

Drucker died in New York City, United States.
