= 1939–40 Maltese Premier League =

Maltese First Division
- Season: 1939–40
- Champions: Sliema Wanderers F.C. (11th title)
- Matches played: 31
- Goals scored: 117 (3.77 per match)

The 1939–40 Maltese First Division was the 29th season of top-tier football in Malta. It was contested by 6 teams, and Sliema Wanderers F.C. won the championship.

== Teams ==
Locations of the 1939–40 Maltese First Division teams

== League standings ==
Pos	Team	Pld	W	D	L	GF	GA	GD	Pts
1	Sliema Wanderers F.C. (C)	10	7	2	1	39	16	+23	16
2	St. George's F.C.	10	7	2	1	22	7	+15	16
3	Melita F.C.	10	5	0	5	17	20	−3	10
4	Xewkija Tigers F.C.	10	3	3	4	15	14	+1	9
5	Msida Saint-Joseph F.C.	10	2	1	7	10	32	−22	5
6	Valletta St. Paul's	10	1	2	7	11	25	−14	4

Source: rsssf.com
(C) Champions

== Championship tie-breaker ==
With both Sliema Wanderers and St. George's level on 16 points, a play-off match was conducted to decide the champion.

Sliema Wanderers	2–1	St. George's

Empire Stadium

== Results ==
Home \ Away	MLT	MSD	SLM	STG	VAL	XEW
Melita	—	1–0	3–5	0–2	1–6	2–0
Msida Saint-Joseph	2–4	—	0–7	1–5	1–0	1–6
Sliema Wanderers	3–2	6–2	—	1–1	4–2	1–1
St. George's	1–0	1–1	2–1	—	3–0	0–1
Valletta St. Paul's	0–2	0–1	1–8	1–4	—	0–0
Xewkija Tigers	1–2	2–1	2–3	1–3	1–1	—

Legend: Blue = home team win; Yellow = draw; Red = away team win.
