= Edmond Lufi =

Albanian footballer

Personal information
- Date of birth: 14 February 1969 (age 57)
- Place of birth: Shkodër, Albania
- Position: Defender

Senior career*
Years	Team	Apps	(Gls)
1990–1991	Vllaznia	33	(0)
1991–1992	Tirana		
1992–1994	Valletta	32	(0)
1994–1998	Ħamrun Spartans	87	(5)
1998–2001	Pietà Hotspurs	51	(13)
2001–2002	Naxxar Lions	28	(4)
2003	Hibernians	9	(0)
2003–2005	Mqabba	16	(2)

Managerial career
- 2006–2007: Marsa
- 2007–2008: Hibernians
- 2011–2013: Pietà Hotspurs
- 2013–2016: San Ġwann
- 2016: Mosta
- 2018–2019: Melita
- 2020–2024: Luqa St. Andrew's
- * Club domestic league appearances and goals

Edmond Lufi (born 14 February 1969) is an Albanian retired footballer, who played the majority of his career in the Maltese league.

== Playing career ==
One of the first players to leave his country after the fall of communism in Albania, Lufi moved to Malta and played for several clubs as a defender and later became a manager. He left his role as player/coach at Naxxar Lions to join Hibernians in January 2003.

== Managerial career ==
Lufi rejoined Hibernians in 2011 as assistant to head coach Mark Miller. His first stint at the helm was in 2006 when he took charge of Marsa, Lufi also worked two years for Pietà Hotspurs, for San Ġwann and Mosta and he was appointed manager of Melita in June 2018.
