= 1953–54 Maltese Premier League =

Maltese First Division
- Season: 1953–54
- Champions: Sliema Wanderers F.C. (13th title)
- Relegated: Melita F.C.
- Matches played: 56
- Goals scored: 160 (2.86 per match)

The 1953–54 Maltese First Division was the 39th season of top-tier football in Malta. It was contested by 8 teams, and Sliema Wanderers F.C. won the championship.

== League standings ==
Pos	Team	Pld	W	D	L	GF	GA	GD	Pts	Qualification
1	Sliema Wanderers F.C. (C)	14	9	2	3	31	16	+15	20	Champions
2	Floriana F.C.	14	8	3	3	26	17	+9	19	
3	Hamrun Spartans F.C.	14	6	4	4	25	17	+8	16	
4	Rabat	14	6	4	4	25	18	+7	16	
5	Valletta F.C.	14	5	3	6	17	20	−3	13	
6	Hibernians F.C.	14	5	2	7	16	23	−7	12	
7	Birkirkara F.C.	14	3	4	7	11	16	−5	10	
8	Melita F.C. (R)	14	3	0	11	9	33	−24	6	Relegation

Source: rsssf.com
(C) Champions; (R) Relegated

== Results ==
Home \ Away	BKR	FRN	HIB	ĦMR	MLT	RBT	SLM	VLT
Birkirkara	—	0–0	0–0	2–2	1–2	0–2	2–1	0–1
Floriana	0–0	—	4–1	3–2	3–0	2–1	0–2	1–1
Hibernians	2–1	0–3	—	0–1	1–0	0–3	2–3	1–0
Ħamrun Spartans	2–1	5–1	2–1	—	0–1	1–1	1–0	1–2
Melita	0–3	1–2	2–1	0–4	—	1–3	0–5	0–2
Rabat	0–1	1–3	2–2	3–2	3–1	—	1–2	3–2
Sliema Wanderers	2–0	3–2	2–3	1–1	3–2	1–1	—	1–0
Valletta	2–0	0–2	0–2	2–2	2–0	2–2	1–5	—

Legend: Blue = home team win; Yellow = draw; Red = away team win.
