= Wéverton (footballer, born 1992) =

Brazilian footballer

Wewerton
Personal information
- Full name: Wéverton Gomes Souza
- Date of birth: 8 March 1992 (age 34)
- Place of birth: Três Lagoas, Brazil
- Height: 1.78 m (5 ft 10 in)
- Position: Forward

Team information
- Current team: Pembroke Athleta
- Number: 20

Youth career
- Londrina

Senior career*
Years	Team	Apps	(Gls)
2012–2013	Londrina	5	(0)
2013–2014	América Mineiro	11	(0)
2014	Portuguesa	4	(0)
2015	Londrina	3	(0)
2015	Atlético Goianiense	7	(0)
2016	Tigres do Brasil	0	(0)
2017	Toledo	0	(0)
2017	Coimbra MG	?	(?)
2018	Cascavel	0	(0)
2018	Brusque	3	(0)
2019	Londrina	0	(0)
2019–2020	Mosta	16	(5)
2020–2021	Balzan	14	(1)
2021–	Pembroke Athleta	17	(11)
- * Club domestic league appearances and goals as of 18 July 2023

Wéverton Gomes Souza, simply known as Wéverton (born 8 March 1992), is a Brazilian professional footballer who plays for Maltese club Pembroke Athleta as a forward.

== Career ==
Born in Três Lagoas, Wéverton graduated from Londrina's youth setup, and made his first-team debut on 25 January 2012, coming on as a second-half substitute in a 4–0 home routing against Paranavaí, for the Campeonato Paranaense championship. He scored his first goal on 20 January of the following year, netting his side's last of a 4–2 home success against Toledo CW, also in the State Leagues.

On 19 August 2013, after being tracked by Corinthians and Palmeiras in the previous months, Wéverton left Londrina and joined Série B side América Mineiro. He made his debut for Coelho late in the month, starting in a 2–0 home loss against Joinville.

Wéverton finished the campaign with eleven appearances, and after finding his chances limited in 2014, he moved to Portuguesa. After appearing sparingly for the latter (which eventually suffered relegation), he returned to Londrina on 20 November 2014.
