= FS Gelko Hasselt =

Gelko Hasselt
- Full name: FS Gelko Hasselt
- Founded: 2016
- League: Belgian Futsal Division 1
- 2017–18: Belgian Futsal Division 1
Home colours	Away colours

FS Gelko Hasselt is a Belgian futsal team from Hasselt, playing in the Belgian Futsal Division 1.

The club was founded in 2016.

== Kit ==
The team is sponsored by Joma.

== Current squad 2018/19 ==
Current squad as at:

Number	Player	Nat.
1	Roy Sterkmans (GK)	(Belgium)
6	Hamsa Zaaf	(Belgium)
7	Abderrazak Ziriouhi	(Belgium)
8	Anes Beslija	(Belgium)
9	Jawad Yachou	(Belgium)
12	Nermin Hasanbegović	(Slovenia)
13	Gerard González Martínez	(Spain)
15	Ilias Kaddouri	(Belgium)
18	Dimitri Wagemans	(Belgium)
22	Dries Lahraoui (GK)	(Belgium)
25	Joren Paulus	(Belgium)
28	Antoine Mageren (GK)	(Belgium)
