= 2022–23 Maltese National Amateur League =

2nd season of the Maltese National Amateur League

Maltese National Amateur League
- Season: 2022–23
- Dates: 26 August 2022 – 23 April 2023
- Champions: Senglea Athletic
- Promoted: Senglea Athletic; Msida Saint-Joseph; Luqa St. Andrew's; Zabbar St. Patrick
- Matches: 210
- Goals: 763 (3.63 per match)
- Top goalscorer: (Nigeria) Christian Ebisindor Saint (20 Goals)
- Biggest home win: Msida Saint-Joseph 12-0 Mdina Knights (10 March 2023)
- Biggest away win: Pembroke Athleta 0-7 Kalkara United (18 September 2022); Mdina Knights 0-7 Msida Saint-Joseph (5 November 2022); Mdina Knights 0-7 Kirkop United (19 March 2023)
- Highest scoring: Msida Saint-Joseph 12-0 Mdina Knights (10 March 2023)
- Longest winning run: Senglea Athletic (10 Games)
- Longest unbeaten run: Msida Saint-Joseph (12 Games)
- Longest winless run: Ta' Xbiex (20 Games)
- Longest losing run: Ta' Xbiex (11 Games)
- All statistics correct as of 23 April 2023.

The 2022–23 Maltese National Amateur League (referred to, for sponsorship reasons, as the IZIBet National Amateur League) is taking place between August 26, 2022 and April 23, 2023. This is the third season since the Second and Third divisions were unified into the two-group Amateur League system. The Maltese National Amateur League is Malta's third-highest professional football division. The 2022-23 League winners will be promoted to the Maltese Challenge League.

== Teams ==
Twenty-one teams competed in the 2022-23 League. These teams were split into two groups, one of eleven and one of ten.

Location of Maltese clubs played in Maltese Premier League

Team	Location
Birzebbuga St. Peter's	Birzebbuga
Dingli Swallows	Dingli
Gharghur	Gharghur
Ghaxaq	Ghaxaq
Kalkara United	Kalkara
Kirkop United	Kirkop
Luqa St. Andrew's	Luqa
Mdina Knights	Mdina
Mellieħa	Mellieħa
Mgarr United	Mgarr
Msida Saint-Joseph	Msida
Pembroke Athleta	Pembroke
Qormi	Qormi
Rabat Ajax	Rabat
Santa Venera Lightnings	Santa Venera
Senglea Athletic	Senglea
Siggiewi	Siggiewi
St. George's	Cospicua
Ta' Xbiex	Ta' Xbiex
Xgħajra Tornados	Xghajra
Żabbar St. Patrick	Zabbar

== Venues ==
2022–23 Maltese National Amateur League is located in Malta	Pembroke	San Pawl il-Baħar	Ta' Qali	Hamrun
2022–23 Maltese National Amateur League is located in Malta	Luxol Stadium	Sirens Stadium	Centenary Stadium	Victor Tedesco Stadium
2022–23 Maltese National Amateur League is located in Malta	Capacity: 600	Capacity: 800	Capacity: 3,000	Capacity: 1,962

== League stage ==
=== Group A ===
Pos	Team	Pld	W	D	L	GF	GA	GD	Pts	Qualification or relegation
1	Senglea Athletic (C)	20	17	2	1	53	8	+45	53	Promotion to the 2023–24 Maltese Challenge League and Championship play-offs
2	Mgarr United (Q)	20	16	2	2	56	11	+45	50	Promotion play-offs
3	Żabbar St. Patrick (P)	20	15	3	2	53	10	+43	48	Qualification for the play-offs 2nd round
4	Kalkara United (Q)	20	11	3	6	39	25	+14	36	Qualification for the play-offs 1st round
5	Xgħajra Tornados (Q)	20	10	2	8	30	28	+2	32	Qualification for the play-offs 1st round
6	Birzebbuga St. Peter's	20	9	1	10	35	29	+6	28	
7	Qormi	20	7	1	12	30	42	−12	22	
8	Pembroke Athleta	20	7	0	13	29	51	−22	21	
9	Mellieħa	20	5	1	14	21	42	−21	16	
10	Santa Venera Lightning	20	4	2	14	20	50	−30	14	
11	Ta' Xbiex	20	0	1	19	10	80	−70	1	

Updated to match(es) played on unknown. Source:
Rules for classification: 1) Points; 2) Play-offs (only if needed to decide champions or teams for promotion play-offs).
(C) Champions; (P) Promoted; (Q) Qualified for the phase indicated

=== Group A Results ===
Home \ Away	BRZ	KLK	MLH	MGR	PBK	QOR	SVL	SEN	XBX	XJR	ZBR
Birzebbuga St. Peter's	—	1–0	2–1	1–2	1–2	3–1	4–2	0–1	3–1	1–1	0–2
Kalkara United	2–0	—	3–1	0–3	1–0	2–1	1–1	2–4	6–3	1–0	1–1
Mellieħa	1–0	1–3	—	0–4	1–0	0–2	2–0	0–3	4–1	1–3	1–3
Mgarr United	2–0	3–1	2–0	—	5–1	4–1	4–0	0–1	2–1	1–1	0–0
Pembroke Athleta	3–2	0–7	2–1	0–3	—	1–2	1–2	0–3	6–2	0–2	0–4
Qormi	1–5	1–2	2–2	2–3	2–3	—	2–0	0–2	2–0	1–3	0–5
Santa Venera Lightning	1–5	1–3	1–0	1–6	2–1	2–4	—	1–3	1–1	1–2	1–2
Senglea Athletic	3–1	0–0	4–0	1–0	7–1	0–1	4–0	—	6–0	3–0	0–0
Ta' Xbiex	0–4	0–2	1–3	0–6	0–4	0–5	0–3	0–4	—	0–2	0–6
Xgħajra Tornados	1–2	3–2	2–0	0–5	1–3	3–0	1–0	1–2	3–0	—	1–3
Żabbar St. Patrick	2–0	1–0	4–2	0–1	3–1	2–0	4–0	1–2	8–0	2–0	—

Updated to match(es) played on 2 April 2023. Source:
Legend: Blue = home team win; Yellow = draw; Red = away team win.

=== Group B ===
Pos	Team	Pld	W	D	L	GF	GA	GD	Pts	Qualification or relegation
1	Msida Saint-Joseph (P)	18	13	4	1	52	11	+41	43	Promotion to the 2023–24 Maltese Challenge League and Championship play-offs
2	Luqa St. Andrew's (P)	18	9	6	3	35	17	+18	33	Promotion play-offs
3	Gharghur (Note: Gharghur and Rabat Ajax finished equal on points, A play-off decider determines the third place and Qualification for the play-offs 2nd round) (Q)	18	8	7	3	34	17	+17	31	Qualification for the play-offs 2nd round
4	Rabat Ajax (Q)	18	9	4	5	24	16	+8	31	Qualification for the play-offs 1st round
5	St. George's (Note: Kirkop United and St. George's finished equal on points, A play-off decider determines the fifth place and Qualification for the play-offs 1st round) (Q)	18	8	5	5	26	24	+2	29	Qualification for the play-offs 1st round
6	Kirkop United	18	9	2	7	29	19	+10	29	
7	Ghaxaq	18	7	4	7	22	21	+1	25	
8	Siggiewi	18	3	3	12	11	31	−20	12	
9	Dingli Swallows	18	1	6	11	12	32	−20	9	
10	Mdina Knights	18	1	3	14	11	67	−56	6	

Updated to match(es) played on unknown. Source:
Rules for classification: 1) Points; 2) Play-offs (only if needed to decide champions or teams for promotion play-offs).
(P) Promoted; (Q) Qualified for the phase indicated

=== Group B Results ===
Home \ Away	DIN	GHR	GHX	LQA	KRK	MDI	MSI	RBT	SIG	STG
Dingli Swallows	—	1–1	1–1	3–2	0–3	1–1	1–1	1–3	0–1	0–3
Gharghur	3–0	—	0–0	1–2	1–1	4–0	3–3	3–0	3–1	3–1
Ghaxaq	1–0	1–0	—	1–1	0–1	6–2	1–2	0–3	1–0	2–1
Luqa St. Andrew's	2–2	1–1	4–0	—	1–1	5–0	0–2	0–0	1–0	0–0
Kirkop United	2–1	1–2	1–0	0–1	—	2–1	0–1	1–2	0–2	1–4
Mdina Knights	1–1	0–4	1–3	1–5	0–7	—	0–7	0–2	1–1	1–2
Msida Saint-Joseph	3–0	2–2	1–0	2–1	1–0	12–0	—	0–1	6–0	3–0 (Note: Msida Saint-Joseph were awarded a 3–0 win after the Malta Football Association's Protests Board upheld their protest. Originally, the match ended in a 0–0.)
Rabat Ajax	1–0	2–2	1–2	0–3	0–1	3–0	1–3	—	3–0	0–0
Siggiewi	1–0	0–1	0–0	1–2	1–3	0–2	0–2	0–2	—	1–2
St. George's	2–0	2–1	2–0	2–4	1–4	4–0	1–1	1–1	2–2	—

Updated to match(es) played on 2 April 2023. Source:
Legend: Blue = home team win; Yellow = draw; Red = away team win.

== Group B tie-breakers ==
=== Group B Third Place tie-breaker ===
With both Gharghur and Rabat Ajax level on 31 points, a play-off match was conducted to qualify for the play-offs 2nd round

8 April 2023	Gharghur	0-0 (a.e.t.) (4–3 p)	Rabat Ajax	St. Paul's Bay
17:30 CEST	Matthew Borda (yellow card) 45'; Warren Azzopardi (yellow card) 61'; Jonathan Pace (yellow card) 85'		Miguel Aquilina (yellow card) 63'; Andrew Joseph Sant (yellow card) 80'; Immy Micalle (yellow card) 90+3'	Stadium: Sirens Stadium; Referee: Stefan Minic
	Penalties
	Jamie Delia (penalty missed); Mark Cutajar (penalty scored); Robert Ciantar (penalty scored); Matthew Borda (penalty scored); Shawn Vella (penalty scored)		(penalty missed) Immy Micallef; (penalty scored) Craig Borg; (penalty missed) Nobukatsu Tsuchiya; (penalty scored) Dean Sciberras; (penalty scored) Kurt Agius

=== Group B Fifth Place tie-breaker ===
With both Kirkop United and Rabat Ajax level on 29 points, a play-off match was conducted to qualify for the play-offs 1st round

8 April 2023	Kirkop United	1-3	St. George's	Ta' Qali
18:00 CEST	Melchior Grech (yellow card) 56'; Jamie Mifsud (yellow card) 68'; Isaac Abela 70'; Jean Claude Vella (yellow card) 73'		Morientes Muscat 65' (pen.); Jean Luca Caruana 90+2' (o.g.); Paul Simon Ellul 90+4'	Stadium: Centenary Stadium; Referee: Emanuel Grech

== Championship play-offs ==
=== Championship final ===
16 April 2023	Senglea Athletic	2-0	Msida Saint-Joseph	Ta' Qali
11:30 CEST	Esquivel Sebastian Perdomo 39'; Ryan Sammut (yellow card) 43'; Steven Meilak (yellow card) 72'; Nicholas Gauci (yellow card) 77'; Carmelo Caruana (yellow card) 79'; Keith Vella (yellow card) 80'; Aidan Paul Azzopardi 90+1', (yellow card) 90+2'		Ryan Dalli (yellow card) 21'; Carmelo Farrugia (yellow card) 48'; Agatino Sicali (yellow card) 68'; Davide Mula (yellow card) 75'; Jean Pierre Mifsud Triganza (yellow card) 80'	Stadium: Centenary Stadium; Referee: Patrick Falzon

== Promotion play-offs ==
=== Second-place Promotion Decider ===
16 April 2022	Mgarr United	1-2	Luqa Saint Andrew's	St. Paul's Bay
15:00 CEST	Julian Camilleri (yellow card) 22', (red card) 60'; Saint Ebisindor Christian 90+8', (yellow card) 53'; Kevin Camilleri (yellow card) 78'; Jamie Lee Micallef (yellow card) 90+2'		Julien Iwueke (yellow card) 45+2'; Josmike Cesare (yellow card) 45+3', (red card) 90+6'; Sam Lorn Kind 78'; Ryan Schembri (yellow card) 86'; Fabien Lufi 90+3' (pen.), (yellow card) 90+3'	Stadium: Sirens Stadium; Referee: Anthony Paul Vella

=== Play-offs ===
Quarterfinals
4a	Kalkara United	2
5b	St. George's	1
4b	Rabat Ajax	2
5a	Xghajra Tornados	0

Semifinals
3b	Gharghur	2
Kalkara United	3
3a	Zabbar St. Patrick	3
Rabat Ajax	0

Finals
Kalkara United	1
Zabbar St. Patrick	2

=== Quarter-finals ===
12 April 2023	Kalkara United	2-1	St. George's	Ta' Qali
19:30 CEST	David Azzopardi 57'; Vadim Gulceac 60'		Nicholas Zammit 84'	Stadium: Centenary Stadium; Referee: Daniel Casha

12 April 2023	Rabat Ajax	2-0	Xghajra Tornados	Ħamrun
20:00 CEST	Dean Sciberras (red card) 11'; Andy Paul Camilleri 22'; Miguel Aquilina 90+5'		Lark Pino Falzon (red card) 90+1'	Stadium: Victor Tedesco Stadium; Referee: Raiden Psaila

=== Semi-finals ===
15 April 2023	Gharghur	2-3	Kalkara United	St. Paul's Bay
15:00 CEST	Andrew Joseph Zammit (yellow card) 11'; Erik Pietribiasi 19' (pen.); Samuel Agius 52'; Isaac Chircop (yellow card) 75'; Jamie Delia (yellow card) 75'; Warren Azzopardi (yellow card) 90+5', (red card)		Jean Paul Formosa 12'; Ryan Cauchi (yellow card) 16'; Vadim Gulceac 25'; Owen Magri 37' (o.g.); Mario Bartolo (yellow card) 81'; David Azzopardi (yellow card) 84'; Calvin Camilleri (yellow card) 90+2'	Stadium: Sirens Stadium; Referee: Daniel Portelli

15 April 2023	Zabbar St. Patrick	3-0	Rabat Ajax	St. Paul's Bay
17:30 CEST	David Oliveira Souza 15'; Nick Borg 32'; Kurt Borg (yellow card) 75', (goal) 90'; Carl Magro (yellow card) 63'; Andre Joe Cutajar (yellow card) 84'		Matthew Farrugia (yellow card) 75'; Andy Paul Camilleri (yellow card) 90+2'	Stadium: Sirens Stadium; Referee: Andrea Naudi

=== Play-offs final ===
19 April 2023	Kalkara United	1-2	Zabbar St. Patrick	Ħamrun
20:30 CEST	David Azzopardi (yellow card) 30'; Vadim Gulceac 47'		Brendan Scerri (yellow card) 10'; Samuel Buhagiar (yellow card) 20'; Nick Borg 53', (yellow card) 54'; Kurt Borg 77'	Stadium: Victor Tedesco Stadium; Referee: Gerard William Zammit Young

=== Promotion final ===
23 April 2023	Zabbar St. Patrick	2-0	Mgarr United	Ta' Qali
11:00 CEST	Samuel Buhagiar (yellow card) 13'; Nick Borg 18'; John Micallef 64' (o.g.); Shalon Diacono (yellow card) 72'; Andre Joe Cutajar (yellow card) 80'		Clayton Borg (yellow card) 16'; Christian Ebisindor Saint (red card) 70'; Saturday Nanapere (yellow card) 10'	Stadium: Centenary Stadium; Referee: Daniel Portelli

== Season statistics ==
=== Top scorers ===
As of 2 April 2023

Rank	Player	Club	Goals
1	(Nigeria) Christian Ebisindor Saint	Mgarr United	20
2	(Italy) Erik Pietribiasi	Gharghur	16
2	(Malta) Jean Pierre Mifsud Triganza	Msida St.Joseph	16
2	(Malta) Timothy Thomas	Senglea Athletic	16
5	(Brazil) Wéverton Gomes	Pembroke Athleta	15
6	(Malta) Aidan Agius Gilford	Xghajra Tornados	14
7	(Malta) Morientes Muscat	St. George's	13
7	(Malta) Andre Joe Cutajar	Zabbar St.Patrick	13
9	(Malta) Giovanni Galea	Msida St.Joseph	12
10	(Brazil) David Oliveira Souza	Zabbar St.Patrick	11
11	(France) Andrely Kouessabio Makela	Birzebbuga St.Peter's	9
11	(Malta) Malcolm Vella Vidal	Mellieħa	9
11	(Colombia) Esquivel Sebastian Perdomo	Senglea Athletic	9
14	(Malta) Keith Muscat	Birzebbuga St.Peter's	8
15	(Malta) Jean Paul Formosa	Kalkara United	7
15	(Malta) Isaac Abela	Kirkop United	7
15	(Nigeria) Saturday Nanapere	Mgarr United	7
15	(Malta) Aidan Azzopardi	Senglea Athletic	7

==== Hat-tricks ====
Player	For	Against	Result	Group	Stadium	Date
(Malta) Saturday Nanapere	Mgarr United	Pembroke Athleta	5–1 (H)	A	Sirens Stadium, San Pawl il-Baħar	4 September 2022
(Colombia) Esquivel Sebastian Perdomo	Senglea Athletic	Santa Venera Lightning	3–0 (A)	A	Luxol Stadium, Pembroke	4 September 2022
(Malta) Morientes Muscat	St. George's	Kirkop United	4–1 (A)	B	Centenary Stadium, Ta' Qali	16 September 2022
(Italy) Erik Pietribiasi	Gharghur	Mdina Knights	4–0 (A)	B	Luxol Stadium, Pembroke	15 October 2022
(Malta) Andre Joe Cutajar	Zabbar St.Patrick	Ta' Xbiex	8–0 (H)	A	Centenary Stadium, Ta' Qali	28 October 2022
(Malta) Giovanni Galea	Msida St.Joseph	Mdina Knights	7–0 (A)	B	Sirens Stadium, San Pawl il-Baħar	5 November 2022
(Nigeria) Saint Ebisindor Christian	Mgarr United	Ta' Xbiex	6–0 (A)	A	Luxol Stadium, Pembroke	6 November 2022
(Malta) Aidan Agius Gilford	Xghajra Tornados	Mellieha	3–1 (A)	A	Luxol Stadium, Pembroke	17 December 2022
(Malta) Sam Lorn Kind	Luqa St. Andrew's	Mdina Knights	5–0 (H)	B	Victor Tedesco Stadium, Hamrun	8 January 2023
(Malta) Timothy Thomas	Senglea Athletic	Ta' Xbiex	6–0 (H)	A	Luxol Stadium, Pembroke	28 January 2023
(Nigeria) Saint Ebisindor Christian	Mgarr United	Santa Venera Lightnings	6–1 (A)	A	Centenary Stadium, Ta' Qali	24 February 2023
(Malta) Aidan Agius Gilford	Xghajra Tornados	Qormi	3–1 (A)	A	Sirens Stadium, San Pawl il-Baħar	4 March 2023
(Malta) Jean Pierre Mifsud Triganza^{6}	Msida St.Joseph	Mdina Knights	12–0 (H)	B	Victor Tedesco Stadium, Hamrun	10 March 2023
(Malta) Giovanni Galea	Msida St.Joseph	Mdina Knights	12–0 (H)	B	Victor Tedesco Stadium, Hamrun	10 March 2023
(Brazil) Wéverton Gomes	Pembroke Athleta	Ta' Xbiex	4–0 (A)	A	Luxol Stadium, Pembroke	12 March 2023
(Malta) Dale Tabone	Kirkop United	Mdina Knights	7–0 (A)	B	Centenary Stadium, Ta' Qali	19 March 2023

Notes

^{6} Player scored 6 goals

=== Clean sheets ===
Rank	Player	Club	Clean sheets
1	(Malta) Carmelo Caruana	Senglea Athletic	13
2	(Malta) Jonathan Grech	Żabbar St. Patrick	12
3	(Malta) Jacob Chircop St John	Mgarr United	9
3	(Malta) Dean Sciberras	Rabat Ajax	9
5	(Malta) Clive Caruana	Msida Saint-Joseph	8
6	(Malta) Andrew Joseph Zammit	Gharghur	6
6	(Malta) Damian Borg	Qormi / Luqa St. Andrew's	6
8	(Malta) Leon Seisun	Ghaxaq	5
8	(Malta) Mario Bartolo	Kalkara United	5
8	(Malta) Brandon Edward Bartolo	Luqa St. Andrew's	5
8	(Malta) Miguel Abela	Xgħajra Tornados	5
12	(Malta) Ryan Micallef	Siggiewi	4
12	(Malta) Matthew Camilleri	St. George's	4
14	(Malta) Jonathan Mallia	Kirkop United	3
15	(Malta) Ristan Schembri	Birzebbuga St. Peter's	2
15	(Malta) James Magro	Mellieħa	2
15	(Malta) Andre Spiteri	Msida Saint-Joseph	2
15	(Malta) Miguel Falzon	Qormi	2
15	(Malta) Clyde Aquilina	Santa Venera Lightning	2

=== Discipline ===
==== Club ====
- Most yellow cards: 62
  - St. George's
- Most red cards: 6
  - Dingli Swallows
  - St. George's
