= Melita F.C. =

Association football club in Malta

Melita
- Full name: Melita Football Club
- Founded: 28th April 1933; 93 years ago
- Ground: Melita FC Ground
- Capacity: 500
- Manager: Brian Said
- League: Maltese Premier League
- 2025–26: Maltese Challenge League, 2nd (promoted)

Melita Football Club is a Maltese professional football club that represents the town of St. Julian's. Melita was recently promoted to the Maltese top flight for the fifth time in their history, and will once again be playing in the Maltese Premier League from the 2024–25 season. They also play in the annual Maltese FA Trophy.

== History ==
=== Origins ===
Melita Football Club was founded on 28 April 1933 at the first general meeting by Sur Gian Bencini who was elected the first president of the club at that meeting. The cardinal points in its first statute were that the club would have its base in St. Julian's, would have an "amateur" status, that the original colours would be red and white and the motto of the club would be "Play the Game for the Game's Sake" and "The Game First and Foremost". Any or all of these points could only be changed by a unanimous vote at an Extraordinary General Meeting called for such a purpose.

The club has been affiliated with the Malta Football Association since 23 April 1944, representing the locality of St. Julian's.

Anton Naudi, who served as club president for 26 years starting in 1983, a period during which Melita competed in the First Division. He stepped down in 2009 and was succeeded by, Paul Zammit. Matthew Naudi, was appointed as the new secretary while Alfred Zammit replaced Oliver Lautier as the club's representative on the MFA Council. and John Naudi as vice-president, also an ex player. The treasurer remains the same, Joseph Borg.

Although the club has won many honours since its foundation, the greatest of all is the 4–0 victory by the club over Sliema Wanderers in the FA Trophy Final in 1939 and has inscribed its name among the many famous local clubs in this competition. The second biggest success in the club's history was in season 2008–2009 when four competitions were won in maltas Senior Sector which the club was participating in, namely the Runner-up position in the Second Division which meant automatic promotion to the First Division and winners of the 11/111 Division K.O. Cup for the Senior Team and champions of Youth Section "B" which meant promotion to Section "A" and K.O. Cup Winners of Youth Sections "B", "C" and "D" for the Youth U/19 Team. This success has never been attained by the club before and has also never been achieved by any club member of the MFA competing in all the competitions at stake in one season. The third biggest success emerged in season 2012/2013 when the club will be playing Premier Division football for the first time in its history.

=== Early years ===
The club was founded in 1933 by Gianni Bencini. After only six years in the Malta Football Association, Melita FC managed to go all the way to the final of the Maltese Cup. In the final Melita faced Sliema Wanderers, winning the game 4–0 – the first and so far the only major Cup trophy Melita have won. Melita made it to the final for the second consecutive year in 1940, again playing Sliema, but this time they lost the match 3–2. Their league form was very promising having shot up the leagues to play their first season of top flight football in the 1939-40 Maltese Premier League, finishing runner-up, their highest ever league position. They kept their position among the elite of Maltese football until their relegation from the top flight in the 1947-48 Maltese Premier League. The club managed to return to the top tier for the 1953-54 Maltese Premier League, however their stay lasted only one season.

=== 1963-1964: Return to Premier Division ===
Following an absence of 10 years, Melita F.C. sealed their return to the top level of Maltese Football for the 1963-64 Maltese Premier League season.

==== League Standings ====
Pos	Team	Pld	W	D	L	GF	GA	GD	Pts	Qualification
1	Sliema Wanderers F.C. (C)	14	13	0	1	39	9	+30	26	Qualification for the European Cup
2	Valletta F.C.	14	10	2	2	44	8	+36	22	Qualification for the European Cup Winners' Cup (Note: Valletta qualified for the Cup Winners' Cup as Maltese FA Trophy Winners)
3	Hibernians F.C.	14	7	3	4	26	16	+10	17	
4	Floriana F.C.	14	7	3	4	22	18	+4	17	
5	Hamrun Spartans F.C.	14	4	3	7	14	26	−12	11	
6	Rabat	14	4	2	8	24	37	−13	10	
7	Melita F.C. (R)	14	3	2	9	9	26	−17	8	Relegation
8	St. George's F.C. (R)	14	0	1	13	8	46	−38	1	Relegation

Source: rsssf.com
(C) Champions; (R) Relegated
Notes:

Home \ Away	FRN	HIB	ĦMR	MLT	RBT	SLM	STG	VLT
Floriana	—	3–1	3–1	3–0	3–2	0–2	2–1	0–1
Hibernians	0–0	—	1–0	4–0	3–2	0–2	7–1	1–1
Ħamrun Spartans	1–1	1–0	—	1–0	2–2	1–4	2–0	1–6
Melita	0–2	1–1	0–0	—	2–1	0–2	1–0	1–2
Rabat	4–1	2–3	3–1	2–1	—	0–3	4–1	0–8
Sliema Wanderers	4–2	3–0	3–0	4–1	2–1	—	3–1	0–1
St. George's	0–1	0–4	0–3	0–1	1–1	2–6	—	0–2
Valletta	1–1	0–1	3–0	4–1	6–0	0–1	9–1	—

Legend: Blue = home team win; Yellow = draw; Red = away team win.
- Malta - List of final tables (RSSSF)

=== Late 1960s - early 2010s: Life in the lower leagues ===
The club survived for one solitary season before a period of 45 years playing lower league football in the first, second and third divisions, with varying levels of success. Many titles have been won in the third and second division, while Melita's youth nursery team have also had their share of success, as well as a reputation for bringing through quality players that have gone on to play at the highest level. This period also saw inauguration of the Gianni Bencini Ground in Pembroke.

=== 2012–13: Golden Era – Premier League ===
Season 2012–13 promised to be a historical season as it meant that Melita would be playing in the Premier League for the first time in their history. Following near misses for promotion from the 2nd tier, they finally managed to gain promotion by winning the 1st Division title. Melita's Premier League adventure started slowly; however, as the season went by some historical wins and results were obtained, including a 2–1 victory over reigning champions Valletta F.C. as well as a 5–3 victory over Ħamrun Spartans the final day of the season.

==== First phase ====
Pos	Team	Pld	W	D	L	GF	GA	GD	Pts
9	Floriana	22	5	9	8	26	31	−5	24
10	Ħamrun Spartans	22	4	4	14	24	58	−34	16
11	Melita	22	3	5	14	18	56	−38	14
12	Rabat Ajax	22	1	8	13	16	45	−29	11

Source: Malta Football Association
Rules for classification: 1) points; 2) goal difference; 3) number of goals scored.

At the end of the first phase, Melita ended up finishing in 11th place and therefore qualifying for the relegation pool. At this point, the points would be halved and another two rounds of fixtures would be played. Melita did not fair very well in this phase, winning only their final game of the season and therefore confined to relegation.

==== Group table ====
Pos	Team	Pld	W	D	L	GF	GA	GD	Pts	Qualification or relegation
7	Floriana	32	14	10	8	48	38	+10	40	
8	Qormi	32	15	4	13	61	50	+11	34	
9	Balzan	32	9	9	14	48	61	−13	23	
10	Rabat Ajax	32	6	9	17	38	60	−22	22	
11	Ħamrun Spartans (R)	32	6	5	21	39	88	−49	15	Relegation to 2013–14 Maltese First Division
12	Melita (R)	32	4	8	20	31	78	−47	13	Relegation to 2013–14 Maltese First Division

Source: Malta Football Association
Rules for classification: 1) points; 2) goal difference; 3) number of goals scored.
(R) Relegated

=== 2013 – 2018: Return to 1st Division ===
Following the clubs' relegation from the Premier division, Melita have once again cemented their place as a 1st Division team in spite of a number of players ending their playing time with the club. Melita have gone close to returning to the premier league in recent seasons, one time missing out on promotion after losing to Gzira United on penalties in a play-off decider, where the eventual winners ended up facing Mosta F.C. for a place in the 2015-16 Maltese Premier League. The club had maintained their status within the division for a number of years, although survival became the clubs ambition year after year. Unfortunately, the club's long spell in the division came to an end on 18 April 2018, following a crushing defeat to San Gwann F.C. which sealed the clubs fate.

=== 2018 – 2020: Limited success in the 2nd Division ===
Melita F.C. competed in the third tier of Maltese football for the first time in 10 years following the club's most successful period. Led by newly appointed coach Edmond Lufi, the club will be looking to bounce back up to the 1st division at the first attempt with a mix of experience and youth, the majority of which are homegrown products.

Following a disappointing mid-table finish during head coach Edmond Lufi's first season in charge, an inconsistent start to the 2019–20 season ultimately led to the termination of Edmond Lufi's contract at the club, with Youth team coach Saviour Debono Grech stepped up as interim coach, assisted by former player Emilio Cornago San Pedro, until the end of the season. Unfortunately due to the COVID-19 pandemic, the season was cut short and considered null and void, with Melita in 6th position after 19 games.

=== 2020 – 2021: Covid-19, National Amateur League & Promotion ===
Due to the problems associated with the relegations and promotions following an unfinished season, the MFA decided to restructure the league, with three teams getting promoted from the Second Division, and none relegated from the First Division. Moreover, the Maltese Second Division and Thurd Division would be combined, with all teams divided into three sections of 7 or 8 teams, playing each other three times each, before the champions and promotion places are decided via the Playoffs. Melita F.C. will be competing in group C, under the guidance of Coach Saviour Debono Grech, and assisted by Alessandro Ciantar and Simon Cassar. Melita breezed through the section unbeaten and with a 100% record, allowing them to compete for the 1st ever National Amateur League Trophy. Following a draw with Section A winners Mgarr United a loss to Section B winners Luqa St. Andrew's F.C. meant Melita would get promoted, yet were left empty handed. Nevertheless, the season was a successful one in the clubs history and meant that they would be back in the second tier of Maltese football following an absence of three seasons.

=== 2021 – 2024: Challenge League Years & Promotion ===
Saviour Debono Grech remained in charge as Melita returned to the second tier and were placed in Section A of the Maltese Challenge League, once again due to further restructuring of the Maltese leagues. A comfortable first season back saw The Amateurs finish comfortably in 5th position, just outside the promotion places yet with a solid foundation to build upon for the upcoming seasons. At the end of the 2022–23 season, Coach Saviour Debono Grech departed the club following a successful stint, ending his final season in 5th place once again, having qualified for the promotion group. Clive Mizzi was appointed as the new coach of Melita FC as from the 2023-24 Maltese Challenge League season. His first season in charge began with a lucrative international friendly with Italian Serie B outfit Palermo FC, at their home ground, which ended in a resounding 5-1 victory for the Sicilians. Nevertheless, Mizzi had a successful campaign finishing as champions of the 2023-24 Maltese Challenge League and as a result sealing promotion to the 2024-25 Maltese Premier League season.

== New sports complex ==
In 2004 Melita F.C inaugurated their first 5-a-side artificial pitches and in the summer of 2007 the club launched the Melita F.C Complex at its training facility in Pembroke, Malta. The complex includes changing rooms, gymnasiums and a 105-metre full sized 2-Star FIFA-recommended pitch, certified to host UEFA Cup and UEFA Champions League matches. The complex also includes a small stand with a maximum capacity of 70 (400 standing). When the pitches were launched they were seen as one of the best training facilities in the area.

Today the club boasts being one of the best sports complexes on the island establishing itself in 2002 when the administrators came up with the idea to construct some 5 a-side pitches with high quality artificial turf. At that time, there were no pitches of the sort in Malta but after a feasibility study, they opened the first 2 pitches which could convert to one 7 a-side pitch complete with all round fencing, floodlighting and other amenities on the 23rd of May 2004. At a later stage they also embarked on further development and a 50 space car park, additional dressing rooms and a conversion of the full size gravel pitch into a super artificial surface pitch known as FIFA 2 Star, which is the nearest to actual turf complete with lighting of the highest standard and FIFA approved steel surround all along the perimeter were brought to mind for discussion. Eventually all this was constructed and was officially inaugurated on 27 April 2008 along with a restructured block to house a snack bar/restaurant and a committee room, two terraces, a children's playground, kit room and more dressing rooms. The club now also has the first ever Children's Gym in Malta and this is already functioning along with an adult gym both lying underground and housing the most modern and efficient equipment.

Although the club's registered place is in St. Julians where the committees meet regularly, the sports complex is situated in Pembroke as it was never possible to have such a complex constructed in the urban locality of St. Julians, obviously due to lack of space required for such a place. However, notwithstanding the club is in St. Julians and the complex in Pembroke, the club still accepts children and teenagers and adults from any locality around Malta to form part of it.

Old Badge

== Players ==
=== Current squad ===
As of 14 April 2026

Note: Flags indicate national team as defined under FIFA eligibility rules; some limited exceptions apply. Players may hold more than one non-FIFA nationality.

No.	Pos.	Nation	Player
1	GK	MLT	Gosef Mizzi
2	DF	MLT	Adam Aquilina
3	DF	MLT	Alec Sladden
5	DF	MLT	Jack Micallef
6	MF	MLT	Jean Pierre Attard (Captain)
7	FW	MLT	Karl Mohnani
8	MF	MLT	Nick Cutajar
9	FW	NED	Ismael Cisse
10	MF	MLT	Ben Cassar
11	MF	MLT	Alan Borg Olivier (Vice-Captain)
12	GK	MLT	Sean Mintoff
13	DF	MLT	Gareth Barone
14	DF	MLT	Matthias Vella

No.	Pos.	Nation	Player
15	FW	GHA	Eric Mensah
17	DF	MLT	Josuael Azzopardi
18	DF	MLT	Matthew Portelli
19	FW	NGA	Quadri Allionida
20	FW	VEN	Jesus Yepez
21	MF	MLT	Andreas Vella
22	DF	MLT	George Grima
23	FW	MLT	Timothy Cassar Torreggiani
24	MF	MLT	Kurt Chircop
25	DF	COL	Kevin Moreno
26	MF	MLT	Kurt Bondin
27	MF	MLT	Kane Arpa

=== On loan ===
Note: Flags indicate national team as defined under FIFA eligibility rules; some limited exceptions apply. Players may hold more than one non-FIFA nationality.

No. / Pos. / Nation / Player; — / MF / MLT / Paul Galea Testaferrata (at Attard F.C. until 30 June 2026)	No. / Pos. / Nation / Player

=== Youth Team ===
Daniel Sciberras is the current head coach of the Melita under 19 squad.

Note: Flags indicate national team as defined under FIFA eligibility rules; some limited exceptions apply. Players may hold more than one non-FIFA nationality.

No.	Pos.	Nation	Player
1	GK	MLT	Andy John DeBono
2	DF	MLT	Luke Mizzi
3	MF	MLT	Matthew Rossi
4	DF	MLT	Jack Micallef (Captain)
5	DF	MLT	George Grima
6	MF	MLT	Karl Grima
7	FW	MLT	Mark Sammut Peresso
8	MF	MLT	Nick Mifsud
9	FW	NED	Ismael Cisse
10	FW	MLT	Ben Cassar
11	FW	MLT	Timothy Cassar Torreggiani

No.	Pos.	Nation	Player
12	GK	MLT	Andrew Cassar Parnis
14	MF	MLT	Daniel Pawley
12	DF	MLT	Andreas Vella
16	DF	MLT	Luca Abela
18	FW	MLT	Jake Dalli
19	DF	MLT	Andrew St John
20	DF	MLT	Timmy Amato Gauci
21	MF	MLT	Noah Azzopardi
22	MF	MLT	Nathan Grech
23	MF	MLT	Luke Montanaro
25	DF	MLT	Adam Aquilina
26	MF	MLT	Abdulazez Kasem

== Managers ==
- (Austria) Leopold Drucker (1937 –)
- (Malta) George Micallef ()
- (Malta) Louis Borg ()
- (Malta) Tarcisio Azzopardi ()
- (Malta) Pippo Psaila (Oct 1986 – May 1989)
- (Malta) Alfred Debono ()
- (Malta) Robert Kelly (;– Apr 2002)
- (Malta) Steve D'Amato (Apr 2002 – Oct 2008)
- (Malta) Martin Gregory (Oct 2008 – Nov 2012)
- (Spain) Patxi Salinas (Nov 2012 – June 2013)
- (Malta) Jacques Scerri (July 2013 – May 2014)
- (Malta) Neil Zarb Cousin (May 2014 – May 2016)
- (Italy) Andrea Pisanu (May 2016 – May 2018)
- (Albania) Edmond Lufi (May 2018 – November 2019)
- (Malta) Saviour Debono Grech (December 2019 - April 2023)
- (Malta) Clive Mizzi (May 2023 - May 2025)
- (Malta) Brian Said (May 2025 - )

== Honours ==
- Maltese FA Trophy (aka F.A. Trophy)
  - 1939: Winners – final versus Sliema Wanderers 4–0
  - 1940: Runners-up – final versus Sliema Wanderers 2–3
- 1936/37 Malta Amateur Cup Champions
- 1939/40 Malta Amateur Cup Champions
- 1952/53 Maltese First Division Champions (Old Second Division)
- 1962/63 Maltese First Division Champions (Old Second Division)
- 1970/71 Maltese Second Division Knock-Out Runners Up (Old Second Division)
- 1999/00 Second/Third Division Knock-out Winners – final versus St. George's 2–1 (a.e.t)
- 2007/08 Second/Third Division Knock-out Winners – final versus Balzan Youths 5–1
- 2008/09 Second Division Runners-up
- 2008/09 Second/Third Division Knock-out Winners – final versus St. Venera Lightnings 3–0
- 2011/12 Maltese First Division Champions
- 2020/21 Maltese National Amateur League Section C Winners
- 2020/21 Maltese National Amateur League Runners-up
- 2023/24 Maltese Challenge League Champions
