= Pietà Hotspurs F.C. =

Pietà Hotspurs
- Full name: Pietà Hotspurs Football Club
- Nickname: Hotspurs
- Founded: 1968; 58 years ago
- Ground: Pieta' Hotspurs Ground
- Capacity: N/A
- Chairman: Mario Mallia
- Manager: Manuel Caruana
- League: Maltese Challenge League
- 2025/26: 6th Maltese Challenge League
Home colours	Away colours

Pietà Hotspurs Football Club is a Maltese football club based in Pietà, founded in 1968. The club currently plays in the Maltese Challenge League.

== History ==
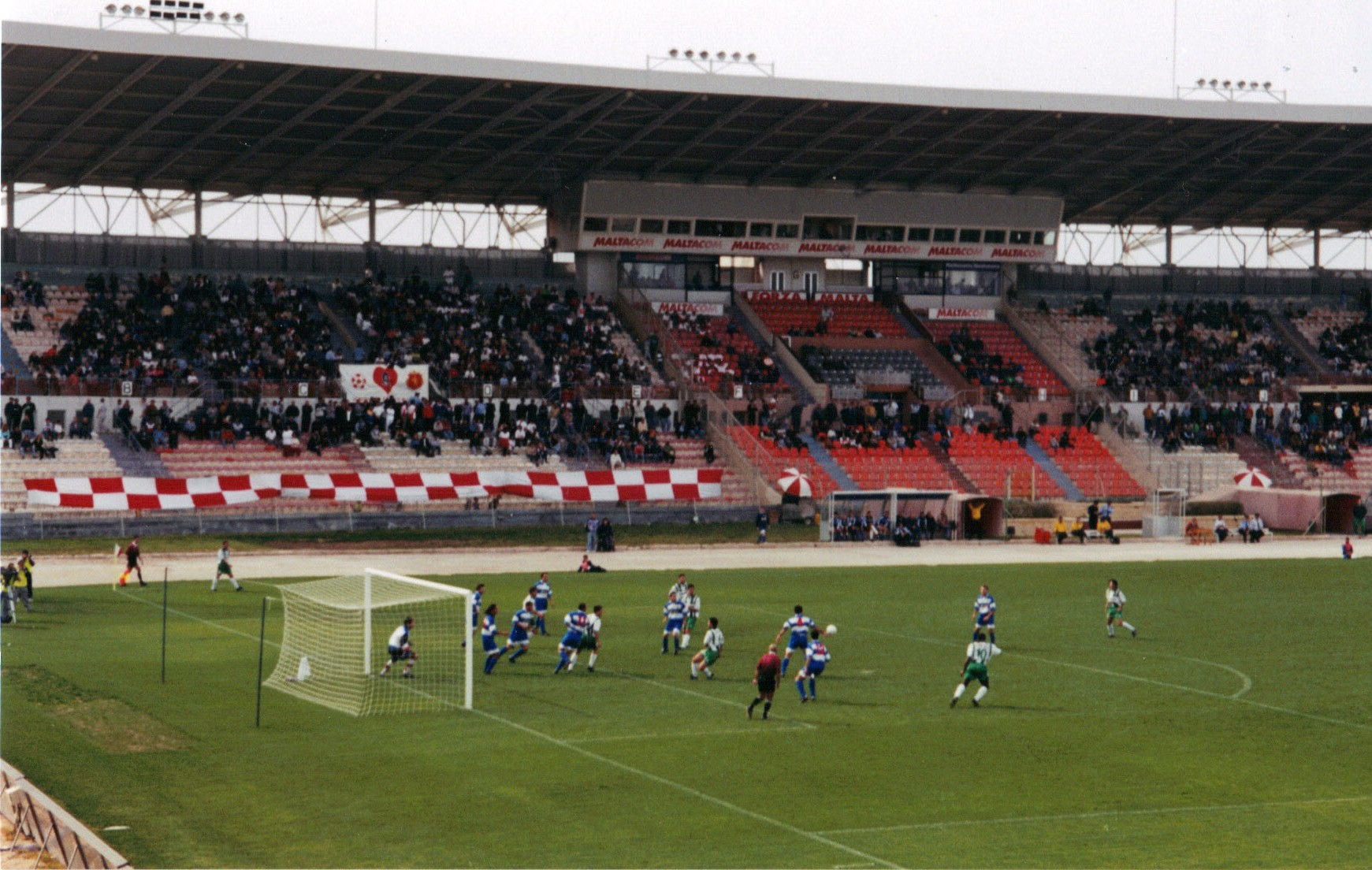
Pietà Hotspurs playing against Floriana during the 1999–2000 Maltese Premier League.

Pietà Hotspurs had their league debut on 23 October 1934, but any success the club had hoped to achieve was postponed due to the outbreak of World War II. After the war's end, Pietà took part in the Anglo Maltese Football League, before joining the Third Division of the National Championships, where they spent ten seasons. Pietà Hotspurs, however, were replaced in the league with Pietà Atlanta in 1962, a team which later changed their name to Pietà Hotspurs in 1973, joining the Fourth Division in 1974. The team won the league and promotion, but spent ten years in the Third Division. They eventually won promotion in 1985, but were soon relegated again. However, they won promotion again in 1988. In 1994 they finally won promotion to the Premier Division.

The club's football nursery has produced talented footballers such as Cleavon Frendo, Massimo Grima, Valeri Bojinov, Saviour Darmanin and Attila Filkor, as well as Jovica Milijić, a Maltese futsal player of Serbian descent.

== Futsal ==
Pietà Hotspurs F.C. fielded a futsal team that competed in the Maltese Futsal League until 2019. That season, Pietà reached the semi-finals of the Maltese Futsal Knockout Cup where they were suffered a heavy 0–9 defeat by Luxol.

== Players ==
=== Current squad ===
As of 1 March 2026

Note: Flags indicate national team as defined under FIFA eligibility rules; some limited exceptions apply. Players may hold more than one non-FIFA nationality.

No.	Pos.	Nation	Player
1	GK	MLT	Reeves Cini
2	DF	MLT	Kaydon Catania
3	MF	MLT	Sami Aboassaf
4	DF	MLT	Isaac Cutajar
5	DF	MLT	Thomas Howland
6	DF	MLT	Sheldon Borg
7	MF	MLT	Gabriel Xuereb
8	DF	MLT	Luca Gatt
9	FW	BRA	Arthur Stelmach
10	MF	MLT	Jeremy Micallef
11	FW	MLT	James Brincat
12	MF	MLT	Owen Magro

No.	Pos.	Nation	Player
14	DF	MLT	Nicholas Pisani
17	MF	MLT	Jake Borg
18	MF	MLT	Luka Bageja
20	FW	MLT	Jaylen Zarb
24	FW	MLT	Daneel Abela
25	DF	MLT	Ivin Gatt
27	DF	ARG	Gabriel Mannino
29	MF	MLT	Zane Mangion
55	GK	MLT	Adam Newell
77	FW	BRA	Lecão
99	MF	GHA	Emmanuel Bio
-	FW	RUS	Karim El-Abudi
