= Swieqi United F.C. =

- Full name: Swieqi United Football Club
- Nicknames: The Orange; The Owls
- Founded: 2009; 17 years ago
- Ground: Santa Clara, Pembroke, Malta
- Capacity: N/A
- Manager: Liam Mangion
- League: Maltese Challenge League & Maltese Futsal League
- 2025–26: Maltese Challenge League, 3rd
- Website: swieqiunitedfc.com
Home colours	Away colours

Swieqi United Football Club is a Maltese professional football and futsal club representing the municipality of Swieqi. The club was created by a group of University Students and Swieqi residents. Founded in 2009, the club has a strong local fan-base, especially amongst young people on the island. The team plays in Orange shirts (a fusion of the red and yellow of Swieqi) and uses blue as the away kit. The club's symbol is the Owl – a reference to the students who founded Swieqi United Football Club. The men’s futsal team will participate in the 2026-27 Maltese Futsal League. After securing a top five finish in the qualifying phase, they earned a spot in the Futsal Premier League, the highest tier in the country.

The club is registered with the Malta Football Association and is registered with the Malta Sports Council. Despite being set up a mere eight years ago, the club has already achieved promotion to the 1st Division, has opened its own premises, launched a men’s and women’s futsal team, Under 19s team, and established a Youth Academy.

== Women's team ==
During the 2014–15 season, Swieqi also launched its first ever Woman's Squad which takes part in the National League. They finished runners-up in the Second Division during the 2015–16 season and went on to win the Second Division the following season.

Swieqi United's women's team has steadily risen through the ranks of Maltese football, with recent seasons marking significant achievements. In 2024, the club made headlines by introducing semi-professional contracts for their players, a pioneering move in the Maltese women's football scene, where most players have traditionally been amateurs. This initiative aims to enhance player development and ensure long-term sustainability for the sport within the club and across the island.

Recent Performances

In the 2023/2024 season, Swieqi United finished as runners-up in the Assikura Women's League having secured their first major silverware by winning the knock-out trophy in 2022–23, defeating Hibernians. The club's performances have been bolstered by key players, including Ghanaian forward Salamatu Abdulai, who finished as the league's top scorer with 23 goals and Brazilian goalkeeper Patricia Araujo, who joined from Corinthians and was named Goalkeeper of the Year by the Malta Football Players Association.

Coaching and Management

The team is currently coached by Dorianne Theuma, a former captain of the Malta women's national team. Theuma took over the coaching duties in the latter part of the 2023/2024 season and is now set for her first full season in charge. Her leadership is expected to further strengthen the team's competitive edge in the domestic league.

Player Development and Transfers

Swieqi United has been active in both retaining key players and acquiring new talent to build a strong squad for the 2024/2025 season. Notable new signings include American fullback Nicola Lebakos and Macedonian youth international Eva Koneva. The team has also retained several foreign players who have been instrumental in their recent successes.

Impact on Maltese Women's Football

Swieqi United's decision to offer semi-professional contracts is seen as a significant step forward for women's football in Malta. This move not only provides financial compensation but also includes initiatives focused on player development, aiming to raise the standard and professionalism of the sport on the island.

== Honours ==
=== Men's Seniors Squad ===
- BOV 1st Division Play-off: Winners (2017–18).
- BOV 3rd Division: Runners-Up (2013–14).

Minor Honours:

- Noel Muscat Cup Winners 2010 (1)
- Strickland Cup Winners 2013, 2014 (2)

=== Youth Squad (U19/U20) ===
- Youth K/O: Runners-Up (2025-26)
- Youth League Section B: Runners-Up (2024–25)
- Youth League Section B: Winners (2021–22)
- Youth League Section C: Winners (2017–18)
- Youth League Section D: Winners (2016–17)
- Youth League Section E: Winners (2014–15)

=== Under 15s Squad (Men) ===
- Youth FA Section D: Runners-Up (2017–18)
- Youth FA Section E: Runners-Up (2016–17)
- Youth FA Section C: Winners (2023–24)

=== Women's Squad ===
- BOV Women's League: Winners: 1 (2024-25)
- BOV Women's League: Runners-up: 5 (2020–21, 2021–22, 2022–23, 2023-24, 2025-26)
- Assikura Women's Super Cup: Winners: 2 (2024–25, 2025-26)
- BOV Women's K/O: Winners: 1 (2022–23)
- BOV Women's K/O: Runners-up: 1 (2021–22)
- BOV Women's Second Division: Winners (2016–17)
- BOV Women's Second Division: Runners-Up (2015–16)
- BOV Women's Fair Play Award: Winners (2014–15)
- Enemed Women's Futsal Trophy: Winners (2023–24)
- Enemed Women's Super-Cup: Winners (2024–25)

=== Youth squads (Women) ===
- MFA Under 17 League: Winners (2022–23)
- MFA Under 16 K/O: Winners (2021–22)
- MFA Under 15 League: Winners (2019–20)

=== Futsal ===
- FMA Futsal Elite Division: Runners-up (2020–21, 2022–23)
- FMA Futsal Fair Play Award: Winners (2014–15)
- Other achievements
- (i) MFPA (Malta Football Players Association) Special Award: Winners (2016–17)
- (ii) MFA (Malta Football Association) Fair Play Award: Winners (2016–17)
- (iii) MFA (Malta Football Association) Roderick Taliana: Nomination for BOV 2nd Div. Player of the year 2017–18
- (iv) BOV Women's 2nd Division Top Scorer: Emma Moore (2016–17)
- (v) Youth League Section D Top Scorer: Nicholas Schembri – 21 goals (2016–17)
- (vi) YFA U15 Top Scorer: Daniele Ferlaino (2016–17)
- (vii) IASC Good Conduct Shield Winners: 2016–17
- (viii) The club was awarded the Gieh is-Swieqi award in 2020.

== Football & futsal squads ==
The current squad: Note: Flags indicate national team as defined under FIFA eligibility rules; some limited exceptions apply. Players may hold more than one non-FIFA nationality.

No.	Pos.	Nation	Player
1	GK	MLT	Timothy Aquilina
2	DF	ENG	Thayne Myrie
3	DF	MLT	Benjamin Hili
4	MF	MLT	Marc Attard
5	DF	ARG	Juan Cruz Aguilar
6	MF	MLT	Matthew Spiteri
7	FW	BRA	Felipe Souza
8	MF	MLT	Paul Fenech
9	FW	ARG	Augusto Cáseres
10	FW	MLT	Kian Leonardi
11	DF	AUS	Isaac Davey
13	MF	MLT	Jake Scerri

No.	Pos.	Nation	Player
16	DF	MLT	Samuel Okoh
17	FW	MLT	Zak Barbara
19	FW	GHA	Emmanuel Asante
20	DF	MLT	Miguel Abela
22	GK	MLT	Fredrick Tabone
23	DF	MLT	Gianluca Aquilina
25	MF	MLT	Matthew Laferla
28	DF	MLT	Glenn Attard
77	FW	MLT	Ayrton Attard
80	FW	GHA	Kojo Okle
96	MF	MLT	Daniel Agius
97	FW	GHA	Salam Mawuena

2026-27 Maltese Futsal League squad:

#1. Galea, Daniel (GK) (C)

#8. Duca, Owen

#9. Emura, Yuya

#10. Rodrigues Silva, Leonardo

#23. Frias, John Mike

#2. Zanotti, Gustavo (GK)

#5. Cachia, Andrew

#7. Theuma, Justin

#18. Parnis, Denim

#21. Lara Obando, Lender Sebastian

#22. Gjepali, Armando

#24. Azzopardi, Bertram

#82. Pickard, Craig

#99. Valletta, Dale

Head Coach:

Craig Pickard
