= Carmel Busuttil =

Maltese footballer (born 1964)

Personal information
- Date of birth: 29 February 1964 (age 62)
- Place of birth: Rabat, Malta
- Position: Forward

Youth career
- 1977–1979: Rabat Ajax

Senior career*
Years	Team	Apps	(Gls)
1979–1988	Rabat Ajax	106	(47)
1987–1988	→ Verbania (loan)	20	(8)
1988–1994	Genk	166	(45)
1994–2001	Sliema Wanderers	143	(64)
2003–2005	Konica Minolta Gunners (futsal)		(26)
Total		435	(164)

International career
1982–2001	Malta	113	(23)

Managerial career
- 2003–2005: Malta (assistant)
- 2005–2006: Santa Lucia
- 2006–2008: Pietà Hotspurs
- 2009–2011: Malta (assistant)
- * Club domestic league appearances and goals

Carmel Busuttil MQR (born 29 February 1964), nicknamed "Il-Bużu", is a Maltese former professional footballer who played as a forward.

Regarded as one of the best Maltese players of all time, he began his career with his hometown club Rabat Ajax winning two Premier League titles, two Super Cups and an FA Trophy. After a year spell with Verbania in Italy, Busuttil joined Genk in 1988. He was a prominent figure in the Belgian side, where he served as club captain and was the team's top scorer for three consecutive seasons. Busuttil returned to Malta to join Sliema Wanderers where he won another Premier League title. He finished off his career in 2001 as one of the highest goalscorers in Premier League history with 93 goals.

At international level, Busuttil made his debut for the Malta national team in 1982. He was capped 113 times, scoring 23 goals in the process. He is the nation's fourth-most capped player of all-time, and his top goalscoring record stood until it was broken in March 2010. In 2004, he was selected by the Malta Football Association as the country's "single most outstanding player" in the last 50 years as part of the UEFA Jubilee Awards.

== Club career ==
=== Rabat Ajax ===
Born in Rabat, Malta, on 29 February 1964, Busuttil was introduced to football when he played with the neighbourhood children next to his parents’ house. He joined Rabat Magpies Amateurs at the age of ten, and following financial and administrative problems a new club was formed under the name of Rabat Ajax. Spotted by former Malta international and head coach of Rabat Ajax, Lolly Borg, Busuttil made his debut at age 14 against Għaxaq. Starting from the Third Division, Rabat Ajax earned two successive promotions, making a return to the top tier of Maltese football for the 1982–83 season after a 17-year wait. In their first season back, Rabat Ajax finished a respectable second place, tied with Valletta, which gave them access to the 1983–84 UEFA Cup. Busuttil made his debut in European competition in the 0–10 defeat against the Czechs of Inter Bratislava, played at the Rabat Ajax Football Ground on 11 September 1983.

After two runner-up finishes in their first two seasons back, in which Busuttil was awarded the first out of his two Player of the Year awards, Rabat Ajax won the Premier League title two consecutive seasons; the second was part of a double with the FA Trophy. The high point of the previous seasons was followed by the low of the 1986–87 season as Rabat Ajax surprisingly suffered relegation. Busuttil finished as the league top scorer with 10 goals.

=== Verbania ===
Following Rabat's relegation, Busuttil expressed interest in leaving the club and Adelmo Paris, who at that time was with Żurrieq, invited him to join him at semi-professional Verbania. In late August 1987, a season-long loan deal was agreed, with an additional clause added that following the season, in the event that a higher-level Italian club showed interest in Busuttil, Verbania would act on behalf of Rabat Ajax and receive 30% of any deal struck. Playing in the Promozione, at that time the fifth level in Italian football, Verbania finished second in the Piemonte and Aosta Valley regional division, gaining promotion to the Interregionale (today's Serie D). Busuttil ended his first stint outside his home country with eight goals to his name, and nowadays is still regarded with high esteem at the Piedmontese side.

=== Genk ===
During the summer of 1988, Belgian side Genk started negotiations with Rabat Ajax for Busuttil's signature. Rabat Ajax were hesitant to sanction the sale due to Busuttil's importance to the team and the lack of agreement on the transfer fee; in turn, Busuttil was suspended by the club for his stance on leaving the club and did not play for three months. Ultimately, the Malta Football Association (MFA) president (and future President of Malta) George Abela interceded on behalf of Rabat Ajax and in September 1988 an agreement was reached for the transfer of Busuttil. The sum agreed was Lm 45,000 (€104,821) and he joined the club after a 15-day trial.

His first season was also Genk's first as a newly-formed club following the merger of Waterschei Thor with KFC Winterslag. The club was marred with an unhealthy environment of bitterness between old rivals and now members of a single club, and finished the season last with only two wins in 34 matches. Busuttil scored the first of his three goals for the season in a 2–2 draw against Beerschot on 2 October 1988. Fortunes soon turned for the club and they finished fourth in the Second Division, thereby qualifying for the promotion play-offs. In the decisive match against Zwarte Leeuw, played on 31 May 1990, Busuttil scored twice as Genk won 7–2. He finished the season as the club's top scorer with 17 goals in all competitions, including 14 in the league.

Returning to the top division, Busuttil further solidified his place in the first team and extended his stay with the club despite interest from Belgian, Turkish and Hungarian clubs. For the following four years he served as club captain. Although considered relegation candidates for most of the 1990–91 season, Genk finished 14th in the league, avoiding relegation by four points; Busuttil scored five goals including the opener in a 1–1 draw against eventual champions Anderlecht on 13 April 1991. In the following couple of seasons, Busuttil finished as club top scorer with ten goals as Genk narrowly avoided relegation in both years. His last season with the Belgian club ended on a low point as the team's poor performances coupled with three managers hired during the course of the season led to a last place finish; Busuttil ended his season with six goals.

He finished his spell with Genk registering 57 goals in 183 games, becoming a crowd favourite and remaining highly regarded to this day.

=== Sliema Wanderers ===
Busuttil returned to Malta and in the summer of 1994 signed with Sliema Wanderers for a reported sum of Lm40,000 (€93,175). In his first season back in his homeland he scored seven goals and helped Sliema Wanderers finish runners-up behind Hibernians. The following season, Hibernians and Valletta started as early title favourites. With inconsistent results between the two and a comeback win for Sliema Wanderers against Valletta in the second round, the Blues never looked back and headed to a league title win, the 23rd in their history. Although this was to be his only Premier League title with Sliema Wanderers, his contribution was not only limited to his goal-scoring capabilities (scoring 35 goals in 67 matches between the 1996 and 1999 league campaigns) but he also served as a player-coach for the 1997–98 season. In the 1999–2000 season, Busuttil added the FA Trophy and Super Cup to his honours, both triumphs coming against Birkirkara. The following season, Busuttil found his first European goal, scoring the winner in a 2–1 win over Partizan in the first leg of the qualifying round of the 2000–01 UEFA Cup.

His last league game of his career came on 18 August 2001 in the 4–1 win over Marsa, the opening game of the 2001–02 season. During this game he scored a goal but was also sent off, resulting in an unfulfilled one-match ban. Busuttil's last official match came the following week, in the second leg qualifier of the 2001–02 UEFA Cup, a 2–1 win over Matador Púchov in which he left a mark with his final goal.

== International career ==
Following his early exploits with Rabat Ajax, Busuttil made his debut for Malta on 5 June 1982 in a 2–1 win against Iceland in a UEFA Euro 1984 qualifying match played at the Stadio Giovanni Celeste. In his fifth cap with the senior side, Busuttil scored a brace in a 2–3 defeat against Spain played on 15 May 1983. His goals gave Malta a momentary 2–1 lead but were outdone by a late winner from Rafael Gordillo. On 15 December 1984, Malta hosted West Germany at the National Stadium in a 1986 FIFA World Cup qualifier. In a record crowd of 35,000, Busuttil gave Malta a ten-minute lead after avoiding the challenge from a German defender and scoring with a low shot to the left corner. Malta ultimately ended up losing 2–3, with Busuttil completing the second half carrying an injury following a first-half stamp from Hans-Peter Briegel where he had to be given a painkiller during half-time.

During the 1990 FIFA World Cup qualifiers, Malta played against Hungary in a home match on 11 December 1988. The Hungarians took a 1–0 lead before the break, but at the start of the second half, Busuttil scored the equaliser after receiving a through pass from Raymond Vella and rounding goalkeeper Péter Disztl. As Hungary regained their lead with a József Kiprich penalty, a minute into stoppage time Busuttil struck again from a Silvio Vella freekick to equalise the scores. In the reverse fixture played at the Népstadion on 12 April 1989, Malta took the lead after seven minutes: John Buttigieg won the ball inside his own penalty box and after beating the challenge of a number of Hungarian players, fed the ball to Busuttil who overcame Ervin Kovács and slid the ball past Disztl. The match ended in a 1–1 draw with Imre Boda scoring from the penalty spot.

On 19 December 1992, in a 1994 FIFA World Cup qualifier, Malta hosted Italy in a packed stadium. Following a first half with no goals, Italy scored twice in three minutes. After a penalty miss from Kristian Laferla following Franco Baresi's handball offence, five minutes from time, Malta reduced the lead when Busuttil collected a Charles Scerri through ball and fed Martin Gregory for the goal. This ended up to be a consolation goal as Malta were defeated 1–2.

Busuttil was named captain for the first time in the 0–3 defeat against Scotland on 17 February 1993, fulfilling this role for 36 games in his international career. On 16 February 1994, Malta faced Belgium for the first time on a senior level, the latter using this match as preparation for the 1994 FIFA World Cup finals. Busuttil, who at that time was plying his trade in Belgium and had arrived in the same aircraft as the Belgian party, collected a pass from Raymond Vella (this was also Vella's last match with the national side following his retirement) and scored what would be the match winner. Returning to Genk, Busuttil rode the same plane as the Belgian squad.

His 100th cap arrived on 6 February 2000 in the 3–0 win against Azerbaijan, the first Maltese national to achieve this feat. His final Malta appearance came on 25 April 2001 in a 1–4 defeat against Iceland, ending his international career amassing 113 games and 23 goals. His 23 goals were the highest scored with the international team up till 3 March 2010 when Michael Mifsud scored his 24th goal in a 1–2 defeat against Finland.

== Retirement ==
Following his retirement, in September 2001 Busuttil opened the Bużu Football School, a youth development initiative aimed at providing football coaching programs. He also ventured into the futsal game, playing for Konica Minolta Gunners which included in its roster a number of former Maltese international players like John Buttigieg, Silvio Vella, Ray Farrugia, and Martin Gregory. He was the top scorer of the 2003-04 Third Division with 26 goals. Alongside Buttigieg, Busuttil participated in a six-a-side competition played in October 2002 at the London Arena representing the Southern Europe team; the selection ended up winning the one-day competition and Busuttil was awarded with both the Goal and Player of the Tournament.

Busuttil took part in numerous local charity events, consisting of friendly-style football matches against teams made up of former professional players and one-off selections.

== Managerial career ==
On 21 October 2003, the Malta Football Association announced the appointment of Horst Heese as the new head coach of the Maltese national team, and Busuttil would serve as his assistant with the aim to take over in two years' time. Heese managed Busuttil during the latter's time playing with Malta's national team and was an important figure in pushing for Busuttil's transfer to Genk. At the end of 2005, Heese made aware his intentions of not extending his contract and the MFA began discussions with Busuttil to take the helm. When Busuttil rejected the association's offer, Dušan Fitzel was engaged on a two-year contract.

On 17 November 2005, Busuttil was presented as the new coach for Third Division side, Santa Luċija, signing a season-long contract. His first game in charge was a 2–1 win over Siġġiewi. Santa Luċija finished fifth in the league which wasn't enough for a promotion place to the Second Division. In November 2006, Pietà Hotspurs announced Busuttil as their new coach. At the time, Pietà Hotspurs were lingering at the bottom of the Premier League table with only two points from eight games, and although he had a slow start the team's form recovered and by the end of the season they confirmed their top-tier status with games to spare. The following 2007–08 season, Pietà Hotspurs ended their 12-year stay at the top level when they finished second to last and were relegated to the First Division.

In July 2009, Dušan Fitzel stepped down from his coaching role of the Maltese national team due to health problems and was replaced by John Buttigieg, with Busuttil returning as assistant, and both officially signed a five-year contract starting from 1 August. Following a two-year spell which gave only two wins from 21 games and with criticism over the players' selection, Buttigieg and Busuttil were relieved of their duties. Between August 2012 and June 2018, Busuttil formed part of Melita's coaching staff, assisting both the senior amateur team in their first-ever season in the Premier League as well as heading the youth academy.

Busuttil is a holder of the UEFA A Licence, and on 6 July 2011, he obtained his Category 1 UEFA Pro Coaching Licence at Coverciano.

== Personal life ==
Busuttil is married to Julie, who he met while playing for Rabat Ajax, and they have two children: Kelly and Gary (the latter named after English striker Gary Lineker).

== Career statistics ==
=== Club ===
Appearances and goals by club, season and competition
Club	Season	League			Cup (Note: No official record is available of cup competitions)		Continental		Total	
Club	Season	Division	Apps	Goals	Apps	Goals	Apps	Goals	Apps	Goals
Rabat Ajax	1979–80	Maltese Third Division	14	2	—		—		14	2
Rabat Ajax	1980–81	Maltese Second Division	13	7	—		—		13	7
Rabat Ajax	1981–82	Maltese First Division	14	9	—		—		14	9
Rabat Ajax	1982–83	Maltese Premier League	14	4	—		—		14	4
Rabat Ajax	1983–84	Maltese Premier League	13	4	—		1	0	14	4
Rabat Ajax	1984–85	Maltese Premier League	12	5	—		2	0	14	5
Rabat Ajax	1985–86	Maltese Premier League	14	6	—		2	0	16	6
Rabat Ajax	1986–87	Maltese Premier League	12	10	—		2	0	14	10
Rabat Ajax	Total		106	47	0	0	7	0	113	47
Verbania	1987–88	Promozione	20	8	—		—		20	8
Genk	1988–89	Belgian First Division	22	3	—		—		22	3
Genk	1989–90	Belgian Second Division	29	11	—		—		29	11
Genk	1990–91	Belgian First Division	28	5	—		—		28	5
Genk	1991–92	Belgian First Division	33	10	—		—		33	10
Genk	1992–93	Belgian First Division	27	10	—		—		27	10
Genk	1993–94	Belgian First Division	27	6	—		—		27	6
Genk	Total		166	45	0	0	0	0	166	45
Sliema Wanderers	1994–95	Maltese Premier League	17	7	—		—		17	7
Sliema Wanderers	1995–96	Maltese Premier League	14	7	—		2	0	14	7
Sliema Wanderers	1996–97	Maltese Premier League	22	11	—		4	0	26	11
Sliema Wanderers	1997–98	Maltese Premier League	23	13	—		—		23	13
Sliema Wanderers	1998–99	Maltese Premier League	22	11	—		—		22	11
Sliema Wanderers	1999–2000	Maltese Premier League	22	7	—		2	0	24	7
Sliema Wanderers	2000–01	Maltese Premier League	22	7	—		2	1	24	8
Sliema Wanderers	2001–02	Maltese Premier League	1	1	—		2	1	3	2
Sliema Wanderers	Total		143	64	0	0	12	2	153	66
Career total			435	164	0	0	19	2	452	166

=== International ===
Appearances and goals by national team and year
National team	Year	Apps	Goals
Malta	1982	3	0
Malta	1983	5	2
Malta	1984	2 (Note: Includes matches against Italy U-21 (played on 5 December 1984) and England B (played on 14 October 1987) which are considered as full international A matches by the Malta Football Association.)	1
Malta	1985	6	0
Malta	1986	1	0
Malta	1987	8	3
Malta	1988	9	9
Malta	1989	9	1
Malta	1990	3	0
Malta	1991	5	0
Malta	1992	5	0
Malta	1993	7	2
Malta	1994	9	2
Malta	1995	8	0
Malta	1996	1	0
Malta	1997	1	0
Malta	1998	8	1
Malta	1999	8	1
Malta	2000	13	1
Malta	2001	2	0
Total		113	23

"Score" represents the score in the match after Busuttil's goal.

No.	Date	Venue	Opponent	Score	Result	Competition
1	15 May 1983	National Stadium, Ta' Qali, Ta' Qali, Malta	Spain	1–1	2–3	UEFA Euro 1984 qualification
2	15 May 1983	National Stadium, Ta' Qali, Ta' Qali, Malta	Spain	2–1	2–3	UEFA Euro 1984 qualification
3	16 December 1984	National Stadium, Ta' Qali, Ta' Qali, Malta	West Germany	1–0	2–3	1986 FIFA World Cup qualification
4	29 March 1987	Estádio do Marítimo, Funchal, Portugal	Portugal	1–2	2–2	UEFA Euro 1988 qualification
5	15 April 1987	Stade de la Maladière, Neuchâtel, Switzerland	Switzerland	1–3	1–4	UEFA Euro 1988 qualification
6	15 November 1987	National Stadium, Ta' Qali, Ta' Qali, Malta	Switzerland	1–1	1–1	UEFA Euro 1988 qualification
7	7 February 1988	National Stadium, Ta' Qali, Ta' Qali, Malta	Finland	1–0	2–0	1988 Malta International Tournament
8	7 February 1988	National Stadium, Ta' Qali, Ta' Qali, Malta	Finland	2–0	2–0	1988 Malta International Tournament
9	10 February 1988	National Stadium, Ta' Qali, Ta' Qali, Malta	Tunisia	2–1	2–1	1988 Malta International Tournament
10	22 March 1988	National Stadium, Ta' Qali, Ta' Qali, Malta	Scotland	1–1	1–1	Friendly
11	1 June 1988	National Stadium, Ta' Qali, Ta' Qali, Malta	Wales	1–1	2–3	Friendly
12	1 June 1988	National Stadium, Ta' Qali, Ta' Qali, Malta	Wales	2–1	2–3	Friendly
13	12 October 1988	Tsirio Stadium, Limassol, Cyprus	Cyprus	1–0	1–0	Friendly
14	11 December 1988	National Stadium, Ta' Qali, Ta' Qali, Malta	Hungary	1–1	2–2	1990 FIFA World Cup qualification
15	11 December 1988	National Stadium, Ta' Qali, Ta' Qali, Malta	Hungary	2–2	2–2	1990 FIFA World Cup qualification
16	12 April 1989	Népstadion, Budapest, Hungary	Hungary	1–0	1–1	1990 FIFA World Cup qualification
17	24 March 1993	Stadio Renzo Barbera, Palermo, Italy	Italy	1–4	1–6	1994 FIFA World Cup qualification
18	7 November 1993	Stade El Menzah, Tunis, Tunisia	Gabon	2–0	2–1	1993 Coupe 7 Novembre
19	16 February 1994	National Stadium, Ta' Qali, Ta' Qali, Malta	Belgium	1–0	1–0	Friendly
20	19 April 1994	National Stadium, Ta' Qali, Ta' Qali, Malta	Azerbaijan	3–0	5–0	Friendly
21	8 February 1998	National Stadium, Ta' Qali, Ta' Qali, Malta	Latvia	1–0	2–1	1998 Malta International Tournament
22	27 January 1999	National Stadium, Ta' Qali, Ta' Qali, Malta	Bosnia and Herzegovina	2–1	2–1	Friendly
23	20 January 2000	National Stadium, Ta' Qali, Ta' Qali, Malta	Qatar	2–0	2–0	Friendly

== Honours and achievements ==
=== Player ===
Rabat Ajax

- Premier League: 1984–85, 1985–86
- FA Trophy: 1985–86
- Super Cup: 1985, 1986

Sliema Wanderers

- Premier League: 1995–96
- FA Trophy: 1999–2000
- Super Cup: 1996, 2000

=== Individual ===
- Maltese Player of the Year: 1983, 1986
- Premier League Player of the Month: October 1985, March 1995, February 1997, October 1997, August 1998
- UEFA Jubilee Awards – Malta's Golden Player
- Malta Olympic Committee Hall of Fame
- Top goal scorer of Maltese Futsal Division Three: 2003-04 as a member of Konica Gunners

=== Orders ===

Midalja għall-Qadi tar-Repubblika: 2000

== See also ==
- List of men's footballers with 100 or more international caps
