= Silvio Vella =

Maltese footballer

Personal information
- Date of birth: 8 February 1967 (age 59)
- Place of birth: Toronto, Ontario, Canada
- Position: Defender

Senior career*
Years	Team	Apps	(Gls)
1985–1994	Rabat Ajax	136	(16)
1994–2002	Hibernians	162	(9)
2003–2004	Konica Minolta Gunners (futsal)		

International career
1988–2000	Malta	90	(1)

Managerial career
- 2010–2013: Rabat Ajax
- 2014–2021: Malta U21
- 2023: Hibernians
- * Club domestic league appearances and goals

Silvio Vella (born 8 February 1967) is a former professional footballer who played for Rabat Ajax and Hibernians as a defender. Born in Canada, he played for the Malta national team.

== Career ==
Born in Canada, Vella has dual nationality, Maltese and Canadian. His family moved to Malta in 1970. He started playing football with Rabat Ajax and when he was promoted to the senior team, he soon became an invaluable asset, and rarely missed a game.

Silvio Vella was chosen as Malta's Footballer of the Year in the 1993–94 season, in spite of Rabat Ajax' relegation as the first (and to date only) player from a relegated team to win that award. This was at the height of his career, and to keep on playing in the Premier Division he joined the Hibernians. Although it was initially a loan deal, it became a permanent transfer later on, and he remained a Hibernians player for the rest of his career.

In 2003, Silvio Vella ventured into futsal, playing for Konica Minolta Gunners during the 2003–04 season and even won the cup. The roster included several former Maltese international players like John Buttigieg, Martin Gregory, Ray Farrugia, and Carmel Busuttil.

After his retirement in the summer of 2002, he joined the Malta Football Association's coaching staff for the various national teams. He served as assistant coach for the Maltese U21 national team until October 2009, when he became U19 national team coach. In June 2010 Vella joined his former club Rabat Ajax as their new manager. He became head coach of the U21 team in March 2014, and held that position until January 2021, when he was replaced by Gilbert Agius.

== Club Management ==
On 7 February 2023, Hibernians announced that Silvio Vella will be the club's new coach, replacing Andrea Pisanu.

== Achievements ==
=== Player ===
- Maltese Premier League: 3

1985/86, 1994/95, 2001/02

- Maltese Cup: 2

1985/86, 1997/98

- MFA Super Cup: 3

1985, 1986, 1994

- Konica Minolta Gunners

Maltese Futsal Knockout Cup: 2003-04

- Maltese Player of the Year : 1

1993/94
