= Martin Gregory =

Maltese footballer

Personal information
- Full name: Martin Gregory
- Date of birth: 10 February 1965 (age 61)
- Place of birth: Malta
- Position: Striker

Youth career
- Young Boys

Senior career*
Years	Team	Apps	(Gls)
1985–1988	Sliema Wanderers	183	(40)
1995–1997	Floriana	50	(6)
1997–2001	Sliema Wanderers	52	(9)
2003–2004	Konica Minolta Gunners (futsal)		
Total		285	(55)

International career^{‡}
1985–1995	Malta	63	(1)

Managerial career
- 1999–2000: Sliema Wanderers (coach)
- 2002–2004: Għargħur
- 2004–2006: Qormi
- 2009–2012: Melita
- * Club domestic league appearances and goals as of 9 November 2012 ‡ National team caps and goals as of 9 November 2012

Martin Gregory (born 10 February 1965) is a retired professional footballer who was most recently manager of Melita in the Maltese Premier League.

During his career he played for various Maltese soccer teams including the Sliema Wanderers and Floriana football clubs, where he played as a striker. During his International career, he played on the Malta men's national football team.

== Club career ==
Gregory made his senior debut for Sliema Wanderers in March 1982 against Gżira United and he went on to win one league title and two cups with the club.

Two years after retirement, Martin Gregory ventured into futsal, playing for Konica Minolta Gunners during the 2003–04 season and even won the cup. The roster included several former Maltese international players like John Buttigieg, Silvio Vella, Ray Farrugia, and Carmel Busuttil.

== International career ==
Martin Gregory debuted internationally in 1985 against the Portugal national football team at 20 years old. He scored once during 19 December 1992, against the Italy national football team, at 27 years old. His last appearance was in 1995, at 30 years old, against the Luxembourg national football team.

== Honours ==
Rabat Ajax

- Maltese Premier League: 1989
- Maltese FA Trophy: 1990, 2000
- Maltese Super Cup: 2000
- Maltese First Division: 1984

Konica Minolta Gunners

- Maltese Futsal Knockout Cup: 2003-04
