= Konica Minolta Gunners Futsal Club =

Maltese futsal club, 2003 to 2006

Konica Minolta Gunners
- Full name: Konica Minolta Gunners Futsal Club
- Nicknames: Gunners, KMG FC, KMG
- Founded: 2003; 22 years ago
- Dissolved: 2006; 19 years ago
- Ground: Corradino Pavilion, Paola, Malta
- Capacity: 1,000
- Chairman: none
- Manager: none
- League: none
- 2005-06: Maltese Futsal League, 6th place

Konica Minolta Gunners was a Maltese futsal club that competed between 2003 and 2006.

== Name ==
The club's full name, Konica Minolta Gunners Futsal Club, reflected a sponsorship agreement with the Maltese branch of the Japanese company Konica Minolta - Business Machines. Initially, they started as Konica Gunners FC but added "Minolta" to their name in mid-2004 due to the change in the name of the Main Sponsor from Konica to Konica Minolta.

== History ==
=== 2003-04 ===
Konica Minolta Gunners began competing in the Maltese futsal league system in 2003, starting from Third Division Section A. Despite hiring numerous former Maltese football internationals, KMG began their journey in the third tier. In their debut season, they went unbeaten, winning 13 out of 15 matches and drawing the remaining two. They secured the Section A title in March with a decisive 3–3 draw against their closest rivals, Southenders from Safi, which confirmed their first-place finish in the group.

In the inaugural season, the Gunners won their only major trophy - the Maltese Futsal Cup. After a 6–3 victory against Seven in the first round, they were drawn against Russian Boarding School Malta, the team that had just won the national title. Although officially a Third Division side, Konica Gunners featured several former Malta national football team stalwarts, including John Buttigieg, Carmel Busuttil, Ray Farrugia, Martin Gregory, and Silvio Vella. Despite a competitive effort, RBSM lost the match 2–4, and Konica Minolta Gunners advanced to the next round of the competition. In the following rounds, they faced only first-tier opponents but managed to win all their matches. They recorded convincing victories in the quarter-finals against Swing Kids (8–4) and in the semi-finals against Amazon Pago (9–2).

In the final match, Buzzu and company faced the futsal section of the renowned Hibernians from Paola. Despite being debutants competing in the third tier, the Gunners prevailed over their first-tier opponents 6–4 after extra time in an exciting encounter. Konica Minolta Gunners led 3–1 shortly before half-time in the final, but the suspension of Oliver Mallia shifted the momentum, allowing Hibernians to level the score at 3–3 and force extra time. During the additional period, the Gunners mounted a strong comeback, scoring three consecutive goals to secure a 6–4 victory and claim the cup. Goalkeeper Anthony Farrugia played a key role in the win, notably saving three out of four penalties during the match before lifting the trophy. The game was held at the Hibernians Pavilion in Raħal Ġdid.

At the end of the season, the winners of the futsal player awards were announced. Guzi Xuereb of Hibernians was named Best Futsal League Player, finishing ahead of Konica Minolta Gunners players Anthony Farrugia and Carmel Busuttil. Busuttil, who was simultaneously Malta's assistant coach, scored 26 goals in the league and was recognized as the top scorer of Division Three.

=== 2004-05 ===
Immediately after winning the Second Division Section A, the Gunners participated in the Summer Futsal Euro Cup held in June 2005 in Riccione. KMG sent an experienced team to Italy: Anthony Farrugia (GK), Carmel Zahra (GK), Carmel Busuttil, Marko Glumac, James Navarro, Ray Farrugia, Oliver Mallia, Robert Micallef, Silvan Borg, Alex Mizzi, Adrian Caruana, and Aaron Micallef.

The Gunners retained the core of their unbeaten squad from the previous season and went on to win the Second Division Section A with a record of nine wins and one draw, extending their unbeaten run to 25 matches and earning promotion to the First Division the next year. In the championship decider, they faced Żurrieq, who had won Section B. The final ended in a draw and was decided by penalties, with Gunners narrowly losing 6–7 in the shootout, finishing as runners-up of the division.

During this season, Konica Minolta Gunners had a successful run in the Maltese Futsal Cup - until the quarter-finals. There, Hibernians avenged their previous season's final defeat by winning 4–2, securing the victory for the club from Paola. Previously, Konica Minolta Gunners recorded convincing victories in the preliminary round against Deportivo Estudiantes (7-3), followed by a 9–2 win over Wolves United in the first round, and a 6–1 triumph against Swing Kids in the second round.

At the end of the season, two Gunners received the main accolades: James Navarro won the Best Futsal Player award, while Serbian international Marko Glumac finished as the top scorer with 20 goals.

=== 2005-06 ===
After two successful campaigns, Konica Minolta Gunners experienced a disappointing final season. They finished sixth in Section A of the First Division, just one place above the bottom, and suffered several heavy defeats during the competition, including losses to Kings of Shade (1–8), El Mundos (1–11), and Hibernians (2–11). Their Maltese Futsal Cup run also ended early, with an 11–2 defeat to the third-tier Stingrays in the first round.

== Notable players ==
- Carmel Busuttil, ex-striker of Rabat Ajax, Sliema, and Floriana; 113 caps and 23 goals for Malta
- (Malta) James Navarro, ex-defender of Zurrieq, Sliema, and Floriana
- Ray Farrugia, ex-striker of Floriana, Melita Eagles, and Naxxar Lions; 4 caps for Malta
- Martin Gregory, ex-striker of Sliema, and Floriana; 63 caps and 1 goal for Malta
- Silvio Vella, Canada-born ex-defender of Rabat Ajax, and Hibernians FC; 90 caps and 1 goal for Malta
- Glumac Marko; ex-defender in lower divisions in Serbia and Germany

== Honours ==
- Maltese Futsal Knockout Cup: 1
  - Champions: 2003-04
- Maltese Futsal League Second Division - Section A: 1
  - Champions: 2004-05
- Maltese Futsal League Second Division: 1
  - Runners-up: 2004-05
- Maltese Futsal League League Third Division - Section A: 1
  - Champions: 2003-04
- Maltese Futsal League Third Division
  - Runners-up: 2003–04
