= John Buttigieg =

John Buttigieg may refer to:

- John Buttigieg (footballer), Maltese Association (soccer) footballer and coach
- John Buttigieg (rugby league), Australian rugby league footballer

== See also ==
- Buttigieg
