= Buttigieg =

Buttigieg (Maltese: Buttiġieġ [bʊtːɪˈd͡ʒɪːt͡ʃ]) is a Maltese surname, derived from Sicilian Arabic أبو الدجاج Abu-d-dajāj, meaning 'chicken owner, poulterer' (lit. 'father of chickens'). People with the name include:

- Albert Buttigieg (born 1964), Maltese politician
- Anthony Buttigieg (born 1962), Maltese politician
- Anton Buttigieg (1912–1983), Maltese politician and poet, president of Malta 1976–1981
- Chasten Buttigieg (born 1989), American author, educator, activist
- Claudette Buttigieg (born 1968), Maltese politician
- Eugène Buttigieg (born 1961), Maltese judge
- John Buttigieg (born 1963), Maltese footballer
- John Buttigieg (born 1977), Australian rugby league footballer
- Joseph Buttigieg (1947–2019), Maltese-American literary scholar, professor and translator
- Mark Buttigieg (born 1966), Australian politician, member of the New South Wales Legislative Council
- Michael Franciscus Buttigieg (1793–1866), Maltese priest, Bishop of Gozo
- Nicole Buttigieg (born 1993), Maltese footballer
- Norman Buttigieg (born 1956), Maltese footballer
- Pete Buttigieg (born 1982), American politician
- Ray Buttigieg (born 1955), Maltese poet and musician
- Rebecca Buttigieg (born 1993), Maltese politician
- Robbie Buttigieg (1936–2004), Maltese footballer
- Simone Buttigieg (born 1994), Maltese footballer
