= Kevin Cannavò =

Maltese footballer

Personal information
- Date of birth: 9 February 2000 (age 26)
- Place of birth: Partinico, Italy
- Height: 1.83 m (6 ft 0 in)
- Position: Forward

Team information
- Current team: Spezia (on loan from Venezia)
- Number: 34

Youth career
- –2018: Palermo

Senior career*
Years	Team	Apps	(Gls)
2018–2019	Palermo	2	(0)
2019–2021	Empoli	0	(0)
2020–2021	→ Vis Pesaro (loan)	32	(5)
2021–2025	Vis Pesaro	86	(12)
2023	→ Padova (loan)	10	(1)
2023–2024	→ Lumezzane (loan)	32	(5)
2025–	Venezia	0	(0)
2025–2026	→ Cosenza (loan)	36	(4)
2026–	→ Spezia (loan)	0	(0)

International career^{‡}
2026–	Malta	5	(0)
- * Club domestic league appearances and goals as of 1 May 2026 ‡ National team caps and goals as of 19:50, 18 November 2026 (UTC)

Kevin Cannavò (born 9 February 2000) is a professional footballer who plays as a forward for Serie C Group B club Spezia, on loan from Venezia. Born in Italy, he plays for the Malta national team.

== Club career ==
Cannavò is a product of the youth sector of Palermo; he signed his first professional contract with the club in October 2018. He made his professional debut for Palermo on 26 January 2019, coming on as a substitute for Ivaylo Chochev in the 75th minute of a Serie B game against Cremonese.

=== Empoli ===
On 18 July 2019, Cannavò signed for Serie B club Empoli for free. He mostly played for their under-19 squad in the 2019–20 season, he was called up to the senior squad 10 times but remained on the bench on all those occasions.

=== Vis Pesaro ===
On 21 August 2020, he joined Vis Pesaro on loan. On 5 July 2021, he moved to Vis Pesaro on a permanent basis and signed a three-year contract.

On 24 January 2023, Cannavò was loaned to Serie C club Padova. On 1 September 2023, Cannavò was loaned to fellow Serie C club Lumezzane, with an option for the Lombardian club to sign the player by the end of the season permanently.

=== Venezia ===
On 14 August 2025, Cannavò signed a three-year contract with Serie B club Venezia. On the same day, he was loaned out to Serie C side Cosenza, with an option to buy. He made 36 appearances and scored four goals for Cosenza throughout the 2025–26 season.

== International career ==
Born in Italy, Cannavò is of Maltese descent. In May 2026, he received his first call-up to the Malta national team, being included by manager Emilio De Leo in the provisional squad for two friendly matches against Slovakia and Azerbaijan; he was eventually included in the final squad.
