= Ray Farrugia =

Maltese footballer

Personal information
- Full name: Raymond 'Żażu' Farrugia
- Date of birth: 1 October 1955 (age 71)
- Place of birth: Floriana, Malta
- Position: Striker

Senior career*
Years	Team	Apps	(Gls)
1974–1978	Floriana		
1978–1990	Melita Eagles	318	(123)
1990–1994	Naxxar Lions		
2003-05	Konica Minolta Gunners (Futsal)		

International career
1977–1983	Malta	4	(0)

Managerial career
- 1994–1998: Naxxar Lions
- 1998–2002: Malta U-21
- 2002–2004: Pietà Hotspurs
- 2005–2006: Marsaxlokk
- 2006–2007: Sliema Wanderers
- 2011–2014: Malta U-21
- 2014–2018: Malta (assistant)
- 2018–2019: Malta
- * Club domestic league appearances and goals

Raymond "Żażu" Farrugia (born 1 October 1955 in Floriana, Malta) is a football coach and former player He had been the head coach for the Malta national football team from 2 May 2018. to the end of 2019.

== Club career ==
Ray Farrugia started out in his hometown team of Floriana, where he played for four years between 1974 and 1978. In 1978, he left for Sydney, Australia, to play for Melita Eagles. He was popular enough to be honoured with the first ever testimonial match in Australia.

In 1990, he returned to Malta to play for Naxxar Lions, until 1994. Farrugia also ventured into the futsal game, playing for Konica Minolta Gunners, between 2003 and 2005, which included in its roster a number of former Maltese international players like John Buttigieg, Silvio Vella, Carmel Busuttil, and Martin Gregory. They even managed to win the cup in 2004 as third-tier side. cup

== International career ==
Farrugia played four times for Malta, twice against Tunisia, the infamous 12–1 defeat against Spain, and once against the Netherlands. He had attracted the interest of Australia when playing in Sydney, however he was unable to join the squad since he had already turned out for Malta.

== Managerial career ==
Between 1994 and 1998, Farrugia coached Naxxar Lions. He served as the head coach of the Malta under-21 team between 2011 and 2014. In 2014, he was promoted to assistant coach to Pietro Ghedin who was at the helm of the Malta senior side.

After the sacking of Tom Saintfiet, Farrugia was appointed as head coach for Malta's senior team.

Farrugia debuted as Malta manager on 29 May 2018, against the Armenia national football team with a satisfactory draw. He introduced Malta national under-21 football team players in the squad, such as the likes of Jake Grech and Jurgen Degabriele. He also handed a full debut to Gozitan Ferdinando Apap. Farrugia's second match was a narrow defeat of 1–0 against the Georgia national football team.

After finishing in the last position in the UEFA Euro 2020 qualifying group, in November 2019 the Malta Football Association announced that Farrugia's contract will not be renewed after its expiry at the end of the year.

=== Managerial statistics ===
As of match played 18 November 2019

Team	From	To	Record					Ref
Team	From	To	P	W	D	L	Win %	Ref
Malta	2 May 2018	31 December 2019	18	1	4	13	5.6	
Total			18	1	4	13	5.6	—

=== Honours ===

Midalja għall-Qadi tar-Repubblika (Medal for Service to the Republic): 2020

Konica Minolta Gunners

- Maltese Futsal Knockout Cup: 2003-04
