= 2004–05 Maltese Futsal Knockout Cup =

2004–05 Maltese futsal competition

Tournament details
- Host country: Malta
- Dates: 29 April 2005 - 23 Jul 2005
- Teams: 54

Final positions
- Champions: Hibernians
- Runners-up: Air Malta Cabin Crew

2004–05 Maltese Futsal Knockout Cup was a futsal competition in Malta, organized in a single-elimination format. Fifty-four teams entered the tournament, which began on 29 April 2005 and concluded with the final on 23 Jul 2005. Hibernians claimed the title after an 8–6 victory over Air Malta Cabin Crew in the final.

== Preliminary Round 1 ==
| Team 1 | Score | Team 2 |
|---|---|---|
| Wolves Utd | 6–3 | Korol |
| Paramatta AFC | 2–6 | Datastream |
| Pumas | 3–4 a.p. | FTW |
| Warriors | n.p. | Vittoriosa Stars FC |

== Preliminary Round 2 ==
| Team 1 | Score | Team 2 |
|---|---|---|
| Energizer Boyz | 1–2 | Lazio Supporters Clubs |
| AC Trampi | 2–5 | Jeepers FC |
| Deportivo Estudiantes | 3–7 | Konica Minolta Gunners |
| Johnson | 2–4 | Wolves Utd |
| Southenders | 5–3 | Kerygma Football |
| Blurred Minds | 1–2 | Juvenis Aluserv |
| Big Blue | 3–5 a.p. | Unistars 2000 |
| Babylonia | 4–0 | Datastream |
| Thomas Cook Utd | 6–0 | ECB FC |
| AD Handyman Centre | n.p. | Webcraft |
| Cool Boys | 5–2 | Olimpia 5 Thermaseal |
| Zurrieq FC | 2–0 | FTW |
| Union Press | 1–4 | Fugazi 5 |
| White Guys | 2–0 | Dreamers |
| KM PHS | 5–1 | Central Bank of Malta |
| Deportivo Santa Cruz | 2–4 | Warriors |
| Net Stars | 2–5 | Zurrieq Old Boys |
| Micab Futsal | 2–4 | Southsiders |

== First Round ==
| Team 1 | Score | Team 2 |
|---|---|---|
| Hibernians | 11–3 | Lazio Supporters Clubs |
| El Mundos | 4–2 | Jeepers |
| Konica Minolta Gunners | 9–2 | Wolves Utd |
| Swing Kids | 5–2 | Southenders |
| King of Shaves | 5–1 | Juvenis Aluserv |
| Vindaloo | n.p. | Unistars 2000 |
| Debson FC | n.p. | Babylonia |
| Amazon FC | 5–3 | Thomas Cook Utd |
| Scandals Bar | 3–0 | AD Handyman Centre |
| Head Hunters | 0–6 | Cool Boys |
| Liverpool Supporters Club | 3–0 | Zurrieq |
| St Helen Band Club | 5–6 a.p. | Fugazi 5 |
| AJR Dolceria Italiana | 6–3 | White Guys |
| KM PHS | 2–4 | Warriors |
| Air Malta Cabin Crew | 5–3 | Zurrieq Old Boys |
| Serbia | 2–3 | Southsiders |

== Second Round ==
| Team 1 | Score | Team 2 |
|---|---|---|
| Hibernians FC | 4–2 | El Mundos |
| Konica Minolta Gunners | 6–1 | Swing Kids |
| King of Shaves | 7–3 | Unistars 2000 |
| Babylonia | 0–6 | Amazon FC |
| Scandals Bar | 6–3 | Cool Boys |
| Liverpool Supporters Club | 5–n.p. | Fugazi 5 |
| AJR Dolceria Italiana | 4–3 | Warriors |
| Air Malta Cabin Crew | 7–2 | Southsiders |

== Quarter-finals ==
| Team 1 | Score | Team 2 |
|---|---|---|
| Hibernians FC | 4–2 | Konica Minolta Gunners |
| King of Shaves | 0–4 | Amazon FC |
| Scandals Bar | 5–4 | Fugazi 5 |
| AJR Dolceria Italiana | 0–2 | Air Malta Cabin Crew |

== Semi-finals ==
| Team 1 | Score | Team 2 |
|---|---|---|
| Hibernians FC | 9–7 | Amazon FC |
| Scandals Bar | 3–7 | Air Malta Cabin Crew |

== Final ==
| Team 1 | Score | Team 2 |
|---|---|---|
| Hibernians FC | 8–6 | Air Malta Cabin Crew |

Maltese Futsal Cup 2004/2005 Winner: Hibernians FC

== External sources ==
- FutsalPlanet – Competitions overview
- FutsalPlanet – Competitions and statistics
