= Joseph Griffiths (disambiguation) =

Joseph Griffiths may refer to:

- Joe Griffiths (1890–1973), English footballer
- Joseph Griffiths (1894–1976), English footballer
- Joe A. Griffiths (1910–1986), Maltese footballer
