= Joey Falzon =

Maltese football player and manager

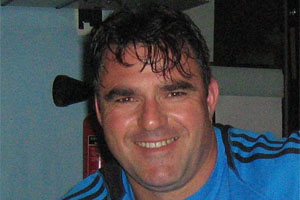
- Falzon in 2010

Personal information
- Full name: Joey Jamie Falzon
- Date of birth: 2 October 1969 (age 57)
- Place of birth: Melbourne, Australia
- Height: 1.78 m (5 ft 10 in)
- Positions: Defender; midfielder

Team information
- Current team: Rabat Ajax (Manager)

Senior career*
Years	Team	Apps	(Gls)
1986–1999	Żurrieq	170	(27)
- Luqa St. Andrew's
- Siġġiewi
2000-2003	Mqabba	16+	(3+)

International career^{‡}
1986–1988	Malta U18	10	(0)
1990–1991	Malta U21	12	(0)
1990–1992	Malta	2	(0)

Managerial career
- 2006–2008: Mqabba
- 2008–2011: St. George's
- 2011-2013: Zejtun Corinthians
- 2014-2016: Rabat Ajax
- 2020-2023: Żurrieq
- * Club domestic league appearances and goals as of 12 February 2010 ‡ National team caps and goals as of 12 February 2010

Joey Jamie Falzon (born 2 October 1969) is a former professional footballer and current manager of Maltese First Division side St. George's. Throughout his career he played as a defender, and as a midfielder. Born in Australia, he represented the Malta national team.

== Playing career ==
=== International ===
Falzon played for the Malta national football team in the 1990 Rothman's Tournament.

== Managerial career ==
Falzon was in charge of Mqabba between 2006 and 2008. In 2011 he was named manager of Zejtun Corinthians after leaving St. George's. In May 2016 he was dismissed after two seasons at Rabat Ajax.

== Honours ==
Zurrieq

- Maltese First Division: 1993

Mqabba

- Maltese Second Division: 2001
