= Robbie Buttigieg =

Maltese footballer (1936–2004)

Personal information
- Full name: Robert Buttigieg
- Date of birth: 27 November 1936
- Place of birth: Malta
- Date of death: 10 February 2004 (aged 67)
- Place of death: Malta
- Position: Defender

Senior career*
Years	Team	Apps	(Gls)
	Sliema Wanderers	166	

International career
1966	Malta	2	(0)

Managerial career
- 1981–1982: Sliema Wanderers
- * Club domestic league appearances and goals

Robert "Robbie" Buttigieg (27 November 1936 – 10 February 2004) was a Maltese football who played as a defender for Sliema Wanderers and represented Malta at international level. A one-club man, he captained Sliema Wanderers and later managed the club.

== Personal life ==
Buttigieg's son, John, was also a footballer and won 97 caps for the Malta national football team.
