= Pippo Psaila =

Maltese football manager (born 1957)

Personal information
- Full name: Philip Psaila
- Date of birth: 2 June 1957 (age 69)
- Place of birth: Malta

Managerial career
- Years: Team
- 1991–1992: Malta

Pippo Psaila (born as Philip Psaila on 2 June 1957, Malta), was the Malta national team coach between 1991 and 1992, and was the Director of Sports of the Malta Olympic Committee.

== Politics ==
Psaila will contest his first general elections in the interests of the Partit Nazzjonalista over the ninth and tenth political districts of Malta
