= Adelmo Paris =

Italian footballer and coach (born 1954)

Personal information
- Full name: Adelmo Paris
- Date of birth: 26 November 1954 (age 71)
- Place of birth: Cambiasca, Italy
- Position: Defender

Team information
- Current team: Vaprio (Manager)

Youth career
- 1970: Vaprio

Senior career*
Years	Team	Apps	(Gls)
1972–1973	Verbania		
1973–1975	Bologna		
1975–1976	Brescia		
1976–1984	Bologna	212	(9)
1984–1986	Żurrieq	14	(1)
1986–1988	Verbania		

Managerial career
- 1989–1992: Verbania
- 1993–1994: Omegna
- 1994–1995: Verbania
- 1995–1996: Verscio
- 1996–1998: Cannobiese
- 1999–2001: Gravellona
- 2001–2003: Valdossola
- 2003–2004: Verbania
- 2004–2005: Gravellona
- 2006–2007: Verbania
- 2008–: Vaprio
- * Club domestic league appearances and goals as of February 13, 2010

Adelmo Paris (born 1954) was a professional footballer and Italian football coach.

== Playing career ==
Paris joined Verbania in Serie C and then moved to Bologna, in which he won the Italian Cup (Coppa Italia) in season 1973-74. He made his Serie A debut with Bologna in a 2–1 loss to Vicenza on 10 February 1974. After a year with Brescia he returned to Bologna, and gained promotion to Serie B in 1983-84. During 1984-86, he joined Żurrieq, playing in the Maltese Premier League and helping Żurrieq win the Maltese Cup in 1985. He went back to Verbania where he retired, taking with him one of Maltese football's legends, Carmel Busuttil.

As a coach, he trained some of the major teams in the province of Verbano-Cusio-Ossola, winning a League and the Italian Cup (Coppa Italia) with the 'Gravellona'. Since January 2008 Adelmo Paris is the coach of Vaprio in the Promotion Piedmont league.
