= 1987–88 Maltese Premier League =

Maltese Premier League
- Season: 1987–88
- Champions: Hamrun Spartans F.C. (6th title)
- Relegated: Mosta F.C.
- European Cup: Hamrun Spartans F.C.
- European Cup Winners' Cup: Floriana F.C.
- UEFA Cup: Sliema Wanderers F.C.
- Matches played: 56
- Goals scored: 106 (1.89 per match)

The 1987–88 Maltese Premier League was the 8th season of the Maltese Premier League, and the 73rd season of top-tier football in Malta. It was contested by 8 teams, and Hamrun Spartans F.C. won the championship.

== Teams ==
Locations of the 1987–88 Maltese Premier League teams

== League standings ==
Pos	Team	Pld	W	D	L	GF	GA	GD	Pts	Qualification
1	Ħamrun Spartans F.C. (C)	14	9	4	1	21	5	+16	22	Qualification for the European Cup
2	Sliema Wanderers F.C.	14	8	3	3	19	7	+12	19	Qualification for the UEFA Cup
3	Żurrieq F.C.	14	6	6	2	17	10	+7	18	
4	Valletta F.C.	14	4	5	5	9	16	−7	13	
5	Hibernians F.C.	14	4	3	7	11	15	−4	11	
6	Floriana F.C.	14	2	6	6	8	13	−5	10	Qualification for the European Cup Winners' Cup (Note: Floriana qualified for the Cup Winners' Cup as Maltese FA Trophy Runners-up, as winners Hamrun Spartans already qualified for the European Cup.)
7	Birkirkara F.C.	14	2	6	6	8	17	−9	10	
8	Mosta F.C. (R)	14	4	1	9	13	23	−10	9	Relegation

Source: rsssf.com
(C) Champions; (R) Relegated

== Results ==
Home \ Away	BKR	FRN	HIB	ĦMR	MST	SLM	VLT	ŻRQ
Birkirkara	—	0–0	0–0	1–1	2–0	0–2	1–2	0–0
Floriana	1–2	—	1–0	0–1	0–1	1–1	0–0	1–2
Hibernians	1–0	1–1	—	1–2	2–4	0–1	2–0	2–1
Ħamrun Spartans	5–0	2–0	1–1	—	4–1	1–0	1–0	0–0
Mosta	2–0	1–1	0–1	0–1	—	1–2	0–1	0–3
Sliema Wanderers	1–1	0–1	2–0	1–0	2–0	—	1–0	1–1
Valletta	1–0	1–1	1–0	0–0	1–3	0–5	—	1–1
Żurrieq	1–1	1–0	1–0	0–2	3–1	2–0	1–1	—

Legend: Blue = home team win; Yellow = draw; Red = away team win.
