= Emilio De Leo =

Italian footballer and manager (born 1978)

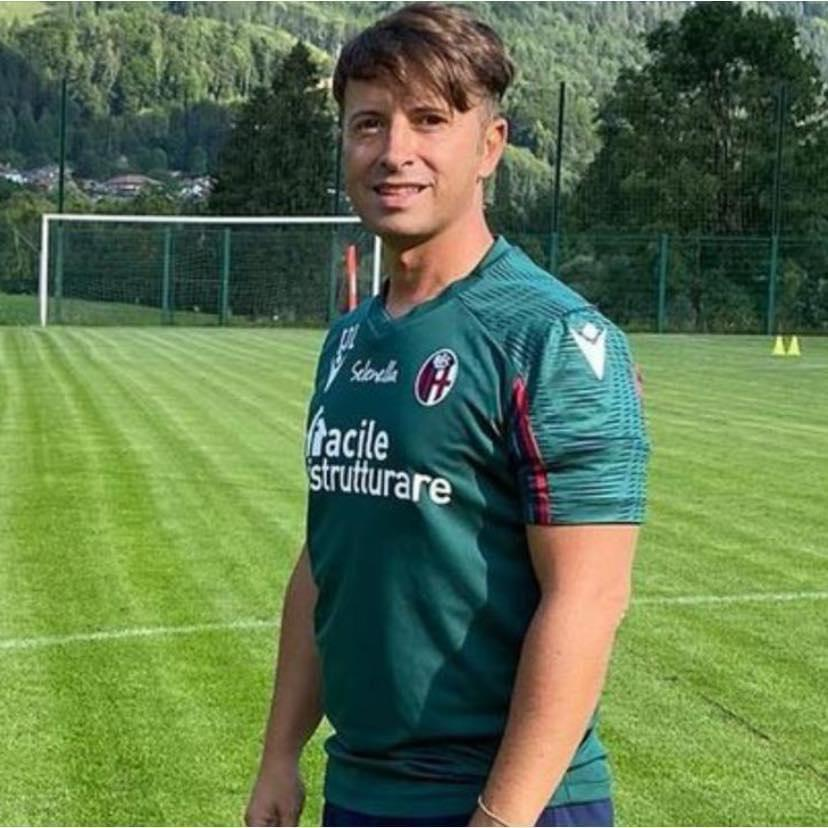

Personal information
- Date of birth: 18 January 1978 (age 48)
- Place of birth: Naples, Italy

Team information
- Current team: Malta (manager)

Managerial career
- Years: Team
- 2011–2012: Aquilotto Cavese
- 2025–: Malta

Emilio De Leo (born 18 January 1978) is an Italian professional football manager, who is the head coach of the Malta national football team.

== Career ==
De Leo started his career working as a youth coach for regional teams from his native Campania such as Cavese and Nocerina. He successively worked as a technical collaborator for a number of coaches such as Roberto Mancini and Siniša Mihajlović. In 2010, he became Karol Marko's assistant at FC Baník Ostrava.

In 2011, he served as head coach of Terza Categoria club Aquilotto Cavese. In 2012, De Leo rejoined Mihajlović's coaching staff, becoming a technical collaborator for the Serbia national football team, and following him also on his subsequent stints at Serie A teams Sampdoria, AC Milan, Torino and Bologna.

He led Bologna as head coach in a total of 19 matches in Serie A (13 in the 2019-2020 season and 6 in the 2021-2022 season) and 2 times in the Coppa Italia.

In 2023, De Leo obtained a UEFA Pro Licence at the renowned coaching school of Coverciano.

On 13 January 2025, De Leo was unveiled as the new head coach of the Malta national football team.

=== Managerial ===
Updated 16 November 2026

Managerial record by club and tenure
Team	Nat	From	To	Record							
Team	Nat	From	To	M	W	D	L	GF	GA	GD	Win %
Malta	(Malta)	13 January 2025	present	20	6	5	9	19	35	−16	30.00
Total				20	6	5	9	19	35	−16	30.00

== Honours ==
Individual

- Premio "Piero Santin": 2019
