= Rabat Ajax Football Ground =

Football ground in Malta

Coordinates: 35°53′34″N 14°24′05″E

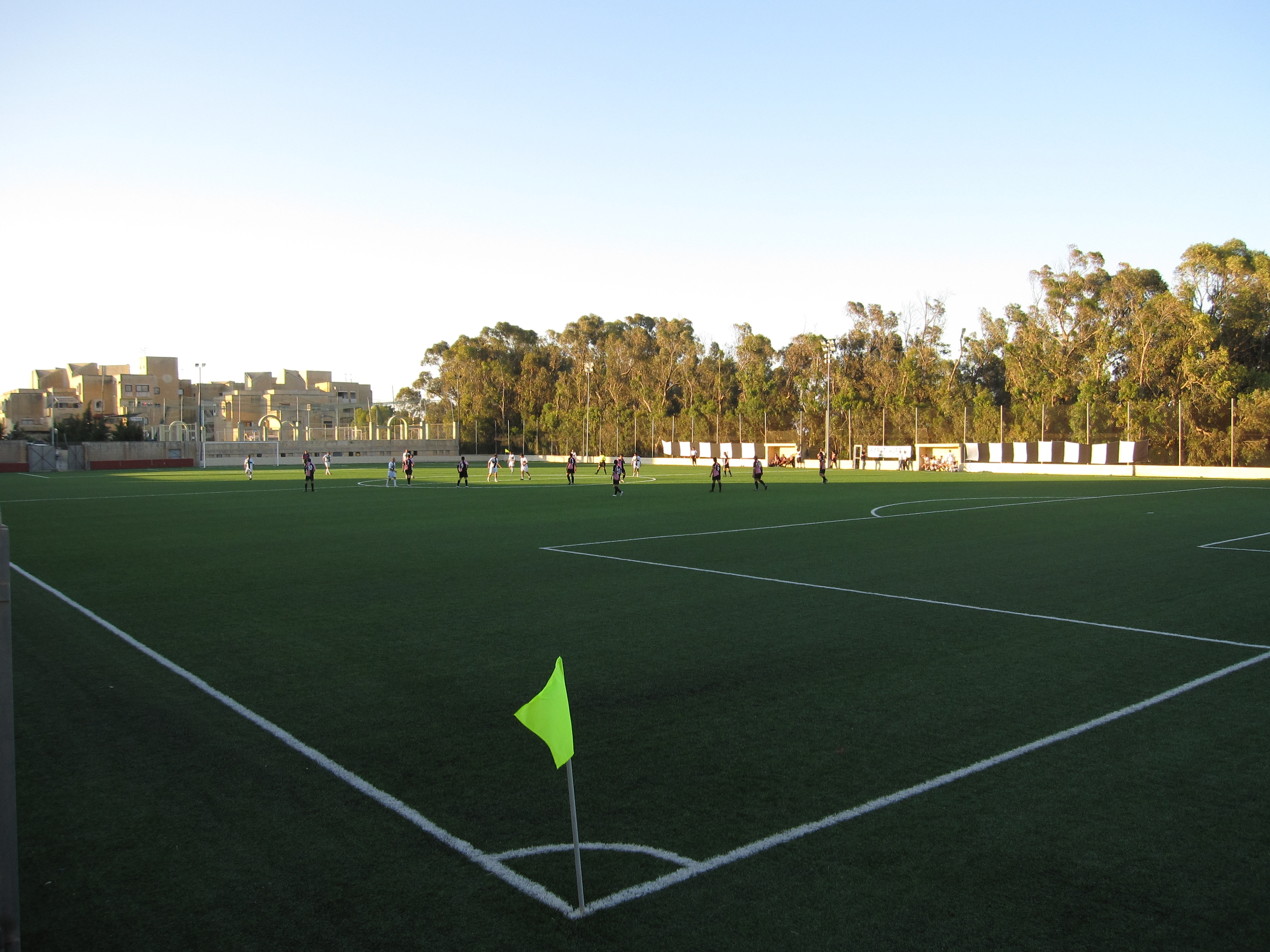
- Interactive map of Rabat Ajax Football Ground
- Location: Mtarfa, Malta
- Capacity: 700
- Field size: 100 x 64

Construction
- Opened: October, 1996

Tenants
- Rabat Ajax F.C. Rabat Ajax Football Nursery

The Rabat Ajax Football Ground is the training ground of Maltese football team Rabat Ajax F.C. and is located in the town of Mtarfa.

It is also the premises of the Rabat Ajax Football Nursery. It is built on the foundations of the Imtarfa Parade Ground, one of the first football grounds on the island.

== History ==
British Serviceman who were stationed in Mtarfa in the beginning of the 20th century started playing football in this ground thus giving birth to football in Rabat. According to records available in newspapers of the early 1900s, the first match which was played there was a friendly match between the Malta Athletic Club and the Royal Dublin Fusiliers, won 4-0 by the latter.

Probably the event for which the Mtarfa Ground is most known is because of the famous 'Imtarfa Cup' which was played in 1909. At that time, no national league was played and clubs used to play several matches against varied opposition, especially against British Army and Navy teams to try and show their strength. There was no doubt that the strongest teams were Floriana F.C. and St. George's F.C. In 1907, St. George's issued a number of challenges to local and services' teams. However no side was strong enough to face them. In April 1908, Floriana accepted this challenge. The Greens wanted to play a match for a silver cup which came to be known as the "Imtarfa Cup". This venue, the Imtarfa Parade Ground (or the Barrack Square, as it was also known) was chosen since Mtarfa is situated far away from both Floriana and Cospicua. The date was 14 February 1909. One of the local dailies at that time "The Malta Chronicle" commented that over 10,000 spectators were present for this match. In fact on the day of the match, the train had to make several extra trips to accommodate the thousands of supporters who went to Imtarfa. The match ended in a 1-1 draw.

Before and after World War II, this ground was a venue of several friendly matches played between the servicemen stationed at Mtarfa or by teams from Rabat who were granted permission by the British to make use of the ground. But then, especially when the British servicemen left the island, this ground was abandoned.

== Upgrading in recent years ==
However towards the end of the 1980s, there was the beginning of a project involving the development of a new town in Mtarfa. Right from the start, there was the idea of having a new sports complex in the area. One has to take into consideration the fact that there was a gymnasium, which several associations were making use of. However at first the possibility of removing the football ground was taken into consideration.

After lot of pressure by club members and Members of Parliament from Rabat, it was decided that the football ground had to be included in the project. Members from the club presented a plan for a sports complex which included a football ground, a tennis court and a basketball court together with the gymnasium. Finally the authorities decided that the sports complex had to include a football ground, a multi-purpose sports hall and two tennis courts. This was almost finished just before the general election in October 1996. The football ground was built on international sizes (100m by 64 metres) and the partly covered terraces could host around 700 spectators.

Two years later, the ground was re-inaugurated following extensive works which were carried out including the levelling and re-surfacing of the pitch, new floodlighting and surrounding of the pitch and the stand with fencing.

Artificial turf was installed in 2009 thanks to a project which was financed by the Malta Football Association, the UEFA HatTrick Programme, National Lotteries Good Causes Fund and Rabat Ajax F.C. This artificial turf pitch was officially inaugurated on June 5, 2010 by MFA President and UEFA Vice-President Dr Joe Mifsud.
