= 1997–98 Maltese Premier League =

Maltese Premier League
- Season: 1997–98
- Champions: Valletta F.C. (16th title)
- Relegated: Xghajra Tornadoes; Tarxien Rainbows F.C.
- UEFA Champions League: Valletta F.C.
- UEFA Cup Winners' Cup: Hibernians F.C.
- UEFA Cup: Birkirkara F.C.
- UEFA Intertoto Cup: Sliema Wanderers F.C.
- Matches played: 135
- Goals scored: 419 (3.1 per match)

The 1997–98 Maltese Premier League was the 18th season of the Maltese Premier League, and the 83rd season of top-tier football in Malta. Ten teams competed in the league, and Valletta F.C. won the championship.

== Teams ==
Locations of the 1997–98 Maltese Premier League teams

== League standings ==
Pos	Team	Pld	W	D	L	GF	GA	GD	Pts	Qualification
1	Valletta F.C. (C)	27	20	5	2	66	19	+47	65	Qualification for the UEFA Champions League
2	Birkirkara F.C.	27	20	3	4	59	22	+37	63	Qualification for the UEFA Cup
3	Sliema Wanderers F.C.	27	18	2	7	64	26	+38	56	Qualification for the UEFA Intertoto Cup
4	Hibernians F.C.	27	15	4	8	50	33	+17	49	Qualification for the UEFA Cup Winners' Cup (Note: Hibernians qualified for the Cup Winners' Cup as Maltese FA Trophy Winners)
5	Floriana F.C.	27	13	6	8	48	27	+21	45	
6	Pietà Hotspurs F.C.	27	10	2	15	40	44	−4	32	
7	Naxxar Lions	27	7	7	13	34	47	−13	28	
8	Hamrun Spartans F.C.	27	7	6	14	26	49	−23	27	
9	Xghajra Tornadoes (R)	27	2	6	19	18	71	−53	12	Relegation
10	Tarxien Rainbows F.C. (R)	27	1	3	23	14	81	−67	6	Relegation

Source: rsssf.com
(C) Champions; (R) Relegated

== Results ==
=== Matches 1–18 ===
Home \ Away	BKR	FRN	HIB	ĦMR	NXR	PTA	SLM	TRX	VLT	XJR
Birkirkara	—	0–0	2–1	2–1	3–0	3–2	1–3	1–0	0–0	3–0
Floriana	1–1	—	1–1	7–1	5–1	1–0	1–2	5–1	1–1	1–0
Hibernians	1–5	0–0	—	3–2	2–0	4–1	0–3	3–2	0–1	5–0
Ħamrun Spartans	0–2	0–1	1–2	—	1–1	1–5	0–3	0–0	1–2	4–0
Naxxar Lions	0–2	1–3	0–5	0–0	—	1–0	1–0	5–0	0–2	8–2
Pietà Hotspurs	0–1	1–0	1–1	0–1	3–1	—	2–3	3–0	1–4	0–1
Sliema Wanderers	0–1	0–3	0–1	3–0	2–0	2–1	—	6–0	1–0	4–1
Tarxien Rainbows	0–1	0–2	0–3	1–2	0–3	0–2	1–5	—	0–6	0–0
Valletta	4–1	2–3	4–0	3–1	1–1	2–1	2–2	5–0	—	3–0
Xgħajra Tornadoes	1–6	0–4	0–3	2–2	1–1	1–1	0–2	3–0	0–1	—

Legend: Blue = home team win; Yellow = draw; Red = away team win.

=== Matches 19–27 ===
Home \ Away	BKR	FRN	HIB	ĦMR	NXR	PTA	SLM	TRX	VLT	XJR
Birkirkara	—	2–1	—	—	5–0	—	2–1	4–1	—	—
Floriana	—	—	2–3	0–0	—	0–1	—	1–0	1–2	—
Hibernians	1–2	—	—	—	0–0	—	1–0	4–0	—	3–0
Ħamrun Spartans	2–1	—	1–3	—	2–0	0–4	—	—	—	—
Naxxar Lions	—	2–1	—	—	—	3–0	1–2	1–1	1–2	—
Pietà Hotspurs	0–2	—	3–0	—	—	—	—	3–1	—	2–0
Sliema Wanderers	—	4–1	—	0–0	—	6–2	—	—	1–2	3–1
Tarxien Rainbows	—	—	—	0–1	—	—	1–6	—	1–5	4–1
Valletta	2–1	—	2–0	3–0	—	5–1	—	—	—	—
Xgħajra Tornadoes	0–5	1–2	—	1–2	2–2	—	—	—	0–0	—

Legend: Blue = home team win; Yellow = draw; Red = away team win.
