= 1982–83 Maltese Premier League =

Maltese Premier League
- Season: 1982–83
- Champions: Hamrun Spartans F.C. (4th title)
- Relegated: Sliema Wanderers F.C. Zebbug Rangers
- European Cup: Hamrun Spartans F.C.
- European Cup Winners' Cup: Valletta F.C.
- UEFA Cup: Rabat Ajax F.C.
- Matches played: 56
- Goals scored: 109 (1.95 per match)

The 1982–83 Maltese Premier League was the 3rd season of the Maltese Premier League, and the 68th season of top-tier football in Malta. It was contested by 8 teams, and Hamrun Spartans F.C. won the championship.

The season saw the relegation of Sliema Wanderers F.C., one of the most historic teams in Maltese football, for the first time in their history.

== Teams ==
Locations of the 1982–83 Maltese Premier League teams

== League standings ==
Pos	Team	Pld	W	D	L	GF	GA	GD	Pts	Qualification
1	Ħamrun Spartans F.C. (C)	14	10	4	0	24	4	+20	24	Qualification for the European Cup
2	Valletta F.C.	14	7	2	5	15	13	+2	16	Qualification for the European Cup Winners' Cup (Note: Valletta qualified for the Cup Winners' Cup as Maltese FA Trophy Runners-up, as winners Hamrun Spartans already qualified for the European Cup.)
3	Rabat Ajax F.C.	14	6	4	4	20	19	+1	16	Qualification for the UEFA Cup
4	Hibernians F.C.	14	4	7	3	16	14	+2	15	
5	Żurrieq F.C.	14	4	6	4	7	8	−1	14	
6	Floriana F.C.	14	3	7	4	8	7	+1	13	
7	Sliema Wanderers F.C. (R)	14	4	4	6	14	11	+3	12	Relegation
8	Żebbuġ Rangers F.C. (R)	14	0	2	12	5	33	−28	2	Relegation

Source: rsssf.com
(C) Champions; (R) Relegated

== Results ==
Home \ Away	FRN	HIB	ĦMR	RBT	SLM	VLT	ZEB	ŻRQ
Floriana	—	0–1	0–2	1–1	0–0	0–0	2–0	0–0
Hibernians	1–1	—	1–1	1–2	1–1	1–3	1–1	0–0
Ħamrun Spartans	0–0	1–1	—	5–1	1–0	1–0	4–0	2–0
Rabat Ajax	1–0	0–0	1–3	—	0–3	0–2	1–1	1–1
Sliema Wanderers	0–1	0–1	0–0	0–3	—	1–2	3–0	0–1
Valletta	1–0	1–3	0–1	2–4	0–1	—	2–1	0–0
Żebbuġ Rangers	0–3	1–3	0–1	0–4	1–5	0–1	—	0–2
Żurrieq	0–0	2–1	0–2	0–1	0–0	0–1	1–0	—

Legend: Blue = home team win; Yellow = draw; Red = away team win.
