= Joe A. Griffiths =

Maltese footballer and coach

Personal information
- Date of birth: 4 December 1910
- Place of birth: Cospicua, Malta
- Date of death: 9 March 1986 (aged 75)

Senior career*
Years	Team	Apps	(Gls)
- Melita

Managerial career
- Rabat
- Sliema Wanderers
- Hibernians
- 1954–1961: Malta
- * Club domestic league appearances and goals

Joe A. Griffiths (4 December 1910 – 9 March 1986) was a Maltese football player and coach who was the first manager of the Maltese national team, from 1954 to 1961.
