= Dušan Fitzel =

Czech footballer (born 1963)

Personal information
- Date of birth: 15 April 1963 (age 63)
- Place of birth: Bojnice, Czechoslovakia
- Position: Defensive midfielder

Team information
- Current team: FC Viktoria Plzeň (asst coach)

Senior career*
Years	Team	Apps	(Gls)
1979–1982	FK Dukla Banská Bystrica		
1983	FK Letek Hradec Králové		
1983–1992	Dukla Prague	158	(3)
1992–1994	EPA Larnaca FC	42	(3)
1994–1995	FK Chmel Blšany		

Managerial career
- 1995–1998: SK Slavia Prague (academy)
- 1998–2005: Czech Republic (youth teams)
- 2006–2009: Malta
- 2016: FC Anzhi Makhachkala (assistant)
- 2017–2019: FC Viktoria Plzeň (assistant)
- * Club domestic league appearances and goals

Dušan Fitzel (born 15 April 1963) is a Czech football coach and a former player. He is an assistant coach with FC Viktoria Plzeň.

He managed the Malta national team from 2006 to 2009.

== Playing career ==
For the most part of his career Fitzel played in the Czechoslovak First League for Dukla Prague in the position of defensive midfielder. In 158 appearances he scored three goals. In 1992, he left for EPA Larnaca in Cyprus where he made 42 appearances and scored three goals. Fitzel retired from his career as a professional footballer in 1995 for FK Chmel Blšany.

== Coaching career ==
Fitzel started his coaching career with the youth team of SK Slavia Prague. From 1998 to 2005 Fitzel worked within the Football Association of the Czech Republic, coaching teams from U18 to U21 level. His greatest achievement came when with him as assistant coach the Czech U21 team won the European Under-21 Championship in 2002. In January 2006 he was appointed the head coach for Malta as the successor to Horst Heese. His contract was to expire with the end of 2007.

The Maltese national team results under Fitzel were promising, including a 2–1 victory over Hungary (first win for the team in official games since 1993) and a 2–2 draw against the 2002 World Cup bronze medalists Turkey. Fitzel was nicknamed "La Valette" in Malta after the Maltese grandmaster and hero Jean de la Valette. In July 2009 health problems made it necessary to give up the role of manager.

He is a lecturer in coach education as well as a contributor of articles on football and coaching in Fotbal a trénink.

== Personal life ==
He is married and has two children.

== Honours ==
- Czechoslovak First League:
  - Runner-up (2): 1983–84, 1987–88
- Czechoslovak Football Cup:
  - Winner (2): 1985, 1990
