= 1985–86 Maltese Premier League =

Maltese Premier League
- Season: 1985–86
- Champions: Rabat Ajax F.C. (2nd title)
- Relegated: Birkirkara F.C. Mqabba F.C.
- European Cup: Rabat Ajax F.C.
- European Cup Winners' Cup: Żurrieq F.C.
- UEFA Cup: Hibernians F.C.
- Matches played: 56
- Goals scored: 131 (2.34 per match)

The 1985–86 Maltese Premier League was the 6th season of the Maltese Premier League, and the 71st season of top-tier football in Malta. It was contested by 8 teams, and Rabat Ajax F.C. won the championship.

== Teams ==
Locations of the 1985–86 Maltese Premier League teams

== League standings ==
Pos	Team	Pld	W	D	L	GF	GA	GD	Pts	Qualification
1	Rabat Ajax F.C. (C)	14	9	5	0	20	5	+15	23	Qualification for the European Cup
2	Hibernians F.C.	14	5	8	1	18	10	+8	18	Qualification for the UEFA Cup
3	Ħamrun Spartans F.C.	14	5	7	2	12	7	+5	17	
4	Valletta F.C.	14	7	3	4	19	16	+3	17	
5	Żurrieq F.C.	14	5	4	5	25	14	+11	14	Qualification for the European Cup Winners' Cup (Note: Zurrieq qualified for the Cup Winners' Cup as Maltese FA Trophy Runners-up, as winners Rabat Ajax already qualified for the European Cup.)
6	Sliema Wanderers F.C.	14	4	3	7	19	22	−3	11	
7	Birkirkara F.C. (R)	14	1	4	9	9	25	−16	6	Relegation
8	Mqabba F.C. (R)	14	1	4	9	9	32	−23	6	Relegation

Source: rsssf.com
(C) Champions; (R) Relegated

== Results ==
Home \ Away	BKR	HIB	ĦMR	MQB	RBT	SLM	VLT	ŻRQ
Birkirkara	—	2–2	0–0	0–0	1–2	0–4	1–3	0–1
Hibernians	1–1	—	0–0	4–2	0–0	2–2	2–0	3–0
Ħamrun Spartans	1–0	0–0	—	1–1	0–2	3–1	2–1	1–0
Mqabba	0–1	0–2	0–0	—	0–0	1–0	0–1	1–5
Rabat Ajax	1–0	2–0	1–0	3–2	—	2–2	4–0	0–0
Sliema Wanderers	2–1	0–1	0–3	4–1	0–1	—	1–4	1–0
Valletta	4–2	1–1	0–0	2–0	0–0	1–0	—	0–2
Żurrieq	4–0	0–0	1–1	9–1	0–2	2–2	1–2	—

Legend: Blue = home team win; Yellow = draw; Red = away team win.
