= John Buttigieg (footballer) =

Maltese footballer and manager

Personal information
- Full name: John Buttigieg
- Date of birth: 5 October 1963 (age 63)
- Place of birth: Sliema, Malta
- Height: 6 ft 0 in (1.83 m)
- Positions: Sweeper; right back

Youth career
- 1979–1981: Sliema Wanderers

Senior career*
Years	Team	Apps	(Gls)
1981–1988	Sliema Wanderers	75	(6)
1988–1991	Brentford	40	(0)
1990	→ Swindon Town (loan)	3	(0)
1991–1999	Floriana	155	(8)
1999–2002	Valletta	59	(4)

International career
1981–1982	Malta U18	4	(0)
1984–2000	Malta	97	(1)

Managerial career
- 2007–2009: Birkirkara
- 2009–2011: Malta
- 2016–2019: Sliema Wanderers
- 2019: Birkirkara
- 2020–2021: Floriana
- * Club domestic league appearances and goals

John Buttigieg (born 5 October 1963) is a Maltese football manager and former player. His last managerial role was being head coach of Floriana.

As a player, he played as a defender and is best remembered for his eight-year spells in the Maltese Premier League with Sliema Wanderers and Floriana. He also played in England for Brentford and Swindon Town and won 97 caps for the Malta national team. After retiring as a player, he managed Birkirkara, Malta, Sliema Wanderers and Floriana.

== Club career ==
=== Sliema Wanderers ===
A sweeper, Buttigieg began his career at hometown Maltese Premier League club Sliema Wanderers at age 16. He established himself in the team during the 1981–82 season, missing just two league games as the club finished runners-up to Hibernians in the league and the Maltese FA Trophy. The Blues were relegated in the following season, but reclaimed their place in the Premier League by finishing as 1983–84 First Division champions. Buttigieg's best season came in 1987–88, when his performances earned him the Maltese Premier League Player of the Year award. The Blues would go on to win the league the title the following season, but Buttigieg managed just one appearance before departing the club in November 1988. He made 75 league appearances and scored six goals during eight years with Sliema. He also tasted European football with the club, appearing in the Cup Winners' Cup in the 1982–83 and 1987–88 seasons.

He had a brief trial at Manchester United in August 1988; including a first team appearance as a substitute for Russell Beardsmore in a pre-season friendly against Hamburger SV at Old Trafford.

=== Brentford ===
Buttigieg played for English Third Division club Brentford in a pre-season friendly tournament prior to the start of the beginning of the 1988–89 season. He had been spotted by manager Steve Perryman's former colleague Peter Shreeves, while playing in Northern Ireland for Malta. He eventually signed for the Bees on 2 November 1988 for a £40,000 fee. Buttigieg was brought in to play his natural sweeper role, but the Brentford defenders had trouble adapting to the system, which led Perryman to revert to using a normal defensive line and reducing Buttigieg to making cameo appearances in various positions off the bench. He made 19 appearances in what remained of the 1988–89 season and was a part of the Bees' run to the quarter-finals of the FA Cup, where they were knocked out by Liverpool.

Buttigieg began the 1989–90 season in an unfamiliar right back role and gradually fell out of the first team picture. The departure of Perryman as manager and his replacement Phil Holder's tactical change to a long ball game saw Buttigieg further frozen out. He moved on a one-month loan to Second Division club Swindon Town in September 1990, to cover for injuries. He made four appearances before his loan expired and the Robins were unwilling to make the move permanent. After being transfer-listed in November 1990, Buttigieg was released in May 1991. Buttigieg made 47 appearances during his time at Griffin Park and the 20 caps he won for Malta during that period made him Brentford's then-most capped international player.

=== Floriana ===
After a transfer dispute with former club Sliema Wanderers saw Buttigieg designated a free agent, he returned to the Maltese Premier League to sign for Floriana in 1991. He was named captain and won the double in the 1992–93 season and a cup treble in 1993–94. In the 1993–94 season, Buttigieg was part of the Floriana team which was the first (and as of 2014, only) Maltese club to qualify for the first round proper of the Champions League. Buttigieg scored both goals in a 2–0 win over Lithuanian champions Ekranas in the qualifying round, which set the Greens up with a two-legged tie against Portuguese club Porto in the first round. Floriana went out 2–0 on aggregate, but salvaged some pride with a 0–0 draw at the Ta' Qali Stadium in the second leg. He also represented Floriana in the Intertoto Cup and the qualifying rounds of the Cup Winners' Cup and the UEFA Cup. By the time he departed Floriana in 1999, Buttigieg had made 155 league appearances and scored eight goals for the club. He held talks over the club's vacant manager's job in October 2009, but the position went to Stephen Azzopardi.

=== Valletta ===
Buttigieg saw out his career with a three-season spell with Maltese Premier League club Valletta, making over 60 appearances and winning an unprecedented sextuple with the club during the 2000–01 season. He experienced European football once again, progressing past Welsh champions Barry Town in the 1999–00 Champions League first qualifying round, before bowing out to Austrian runners-up Rapid Vienna in the second qualifying round. A runners-up finish in the Maltese Premier League in the 1999–00 season saw Valletta qualify for the 2000–01 UEFA Cup qualifying round, but they were knocked out by Croatian club Rijeka 8–6 on aggregate. Buttigieg retired from football at the end of the 2001–02 season, after failing to be offered a new contract.

== International career ==
Buttigieg made his international debut in an unsanctioned match between Malta 'A' and an Italian amateur XI in February 1980, making a second appearance, again against the Italian amateurs in November 1981. Buttigieg made his debut for the Malta U18 team in February 1981 and won four caps for the team during an unsuccessful qualification campaign for the 1982 European U18 Championship.

Buttigieg made his senior international debut on 23 May 1984, in a 1986 FIFA World Cup qualifier away to Sweden, which resulted in a 4–0 defeat. Despite failing to qualify for any major tournaments, Buttigieg won the 1992 Rothmans International Tournament with the team in 1992 and was a part of the squad which finished third in the Coupe 7 Novembre in Tunisia the following year. He scored his only international goal with the opener in a 3–0 victory over Azerbaijan in the 2000 Rothmans Tournament. His 97th and final cap came in a 2–1 friendly defeat to England at the Ta' Qali Stadium on 3 June 2000. In an interview in May 2001, Buttigieg revealed he felt he "wasn't treated well" by the Malta Football Association, as he was denied a chance to reach 100 caps, despite three additional friendlies being scheduled to take place after the England game.

== Managerial and coaching career ==
=== Busu Football School ===
After his retirement from football, Buttigieg coached at the Busu Football School, run by former Malta international teammate Carmel Busuttil.

=== Birkirkara ===
In March 2007, Buttigieg joined Maltese Premier League club Birkirkara as manager. He had a successful first season, turning the club's fortunes around and winning the 2007–08 Maltese FA Trophy. In June 2008, Buttigieg was awarded a UEFA pro-coaching license at the renowned Coverciano school in Italy. Buttigieg's Stripes opened the 2008–09 season by winning the Löwenbräu Cup, but suffered defeat to Valletta in the Maltese Super Cup. After finishing third in the Championship Pool, Buttigieg stepped down from his role in July 2009.

=== Malta ===
In July 2009, Buttigieg was appointed as manager of the Malta national team. He replaced Dušan Fitzel, who was forced to step down five months before the end of his contract due to health problems. Buttigieg was joined by assistant manager Carmel Busuttil and both signed a five-year contract with the Malta Football Association. Buttigieg had a good start in the role, beating Georgia 2–0 in a friendly on 12 August. The final two games of Malta's 2010 World Cup qualifying campaign resulted in defeats to Sweden and Portugal and the team finished bottom of its group. After losing 15 of his first 17 games, Buttigieg secured his second win in international management with a 2–1 friendly victory over the Central African Republic on 10 August 2011. Malta's Euro 2012 qualifying campaign was a disaster, with 9 defeats and a draw (which came against Georgia) and finishing bottom of their group. Buttigieg and Busuttil were removed from their posts on 25 October 2011, having recorded just two victories from 21 games.

=== Return to Birkirkara ===
Together with Carmel Busuttil, Buttigieg returned to Birkirkara to take charge of the Maltese Premier League club's academy in December 2011.

=== Floriana ===
Buttigieg returned to former club Floriana in July 2014 to take over the role of technical director of the club's academy.

=== Sliema Wanderers ===
In June 2016, Buttigieg returned to Sliema Wanderers to take over the job as manager. His tenure got off to a start, with victory in the 2016 Summer Cup. A mid-table 2016–17 season also featured defeats in the 2016 Maltese Super Cup and the 2017 Maltese FA Trophy Final. A failure to win any further silverware and a second-successive mid-table finish at the end of the 2017–18 season led to Buttigieg's departure by mutual consent in January 2019.

=== Third spell at Birkirkara ===
In April 2019, Buttigieg took over as manager Birkirkara, for the second time, on a two-year contract. He resigned from the position in September 2019.

=== Return to Floriana ===
In December 2020, Buttigieg returned to Floriana and signed a contract to become head coach. After six weeks in charge of the Greens, he resigned from the position in February 2021.

== Personal life ==
Buttigieg's father Robbie was also a footballer.

== Career statistics ==
=== Club ===
Appearances and goals by club, season and competition
Club	Season	League			FA Cup		League Cup		Other		Total	
Club	Season	Division	Apps	Goals	Apps	Goals	Apps	Goals	Apps	Goals	Apps	Goals
Brentford	1988–89	Third Division	18	0	1	0	—		0	0	19	0
Brentford	1989–90	Third Division	22	0	0	0	4	0	2 (Note: Appearances in Football League Trophy)	0	28	0
Brentford	Total		40	0	1	0	4	0	2	0	47	0
Swindon Town (loan)	1990–91	Second Division	3	0	—		1	0	—		4	0
Career total			43	0	1	0	5	0	2	0	51	0

=== International ===
Appearances and goals by national team and year
National team	Year	Apps	Goals
Malta	1984	3	0
Malta	1985	6	0
Malta	1986	1	0
Malta	1987	7	0
Malta	1988	10	0
Malta	1989	9	0
Malta	1990	5	0
Malta	1991	4	0
Malta	1992	3	0
Malta	1993	8	0
Malta	1994	13	0
Malta	1995	5	0
Malta	1996	3	0
Malta	1998	3	0
Malta	1999	8	0
Malta	2000	7	1
Total		97	1

Scores and results list Malta's goal tally first, score column indicates score after each Buttigieg goal.

List of international goals scored by John Buttigieg
No.	Date	Venue	Opponent	Score	Result	Competition	Ref.
1.	6 February 2000	National Stadium, Ta' Qali, Malta	Azerbaijan	1–0	3–0	Rothmans International Tournament	

== Honours ==
=== Player ===
Sliema Wanderers

- Independence Cup: 1981–82
- Euro Cup: 1982

Malta

- Rothmans International Tournament: 1992
- Coupe 7 Novembre: 1993 (third place)

=== Manager ===
Sliema Wanderers

- Summer Cup: 2016

=== Individual ===
- Maltese Premier League Player of the Year: 1987–88
- Floriana Player of the Year: 1994–95

== Managerial career statistics ==
As of 11 February 2021

Managerial record by team and tenure
Team	From	To	Record					Ref
Team	From	To	P	W	D	L	Win %	Ref
Malta	21 June 2009	25 October 2011	21	2	3	16	9.5	
Sliema Wanderers	June 2016	January 2019	86	42	16	28	48.8	
Birkirkara	18 April 2019	7 September 2019	7	4	1	2	57.1	
Floriana	26 December 2020	11 February 2021	7	0	3	4	0.0	
Total			121	48	23	50	39.7	—
