= Rabat Ajax F.C. =

Maltese football club

Rabat Ajax
- Full name: Rabat Ajax Football Club
- Nickname: The Magpies
- Founded: 1930; 96 years ago (as Rabat Rovers)
- Ground: Rabat Ajax Football Ground, Mtarfa, Malta
- Capacity: 700
- Chairman: Glenn Joseph Micallef
- Manager: Matthew Genuis
- League: National Amateur League II
- 2025–26: Maltese Challenge League, Group A, 10th (relegated)
Home colours	Away colours

Rabat Ajax Football Club is a Maltese football club based in Rabat. The last promotion to the Maltese Premier League was achieved in the 2011–12 season, when they earned promotion after finishing second behind Melita. In the 2020–21 National Amateur League season, the club finished 4th in group B, qualifying for the promotion playoffs. After beating Msida St. Joseph and Marsaskala in the quarter and semi finals respectively, they reached the final against Kirkop United. The Magpies won the final 2–1, securing the fourth and final promotion spot to the following season's Challenge League.

== History ==
- 1930: Club founded with the name Rabat Rovers
- 1937: Joined with Rabat Rangers and Old City to form Rabat Zvanks
- 1938: Club was renamed to Rabat FC
- 1980: Joined with Rabat Ajax to form Rabat Ajax FC
- 1983: First participation in a European Cup (C3) (1983/84 season)
- 1985: Rabat Ajax win The Maltese Championship
- 1986: Rabat Ajax win The Maltese Championship and Maltese Cup

== Honours ==
- Maltese Premier League
  - Champions : 1984–85, 1985–86
- Maltese FA Trophy
  - Winners: 1985–86
  - Finalists: 1953–54
- Maltese Super Cup
  - Winners : 1985, 1986
- Maltese First Division
  - Champions : 1950/51, 1961/62, 1981–82, 1989/90, 1997/98

== UEFA Cups qualifiers ==
In 1983–84 Rabat Ajax met Czechoslovak side Inter Bratislava in the UEFA Cup, where following a 0–10 dumping at home, they also lost 0–6 in the return leg in Bratislava. The following year Rabat Ajax also played in the UEFA Cup, where it met Yugoslav side Partizan Belgrade, with whom it lost both matches with a 0–2 scoreline.

Rabat Ajax has played four qualification matches in the European Cup. In 1985–86 they lost twice a 5–0 score against Cypriot side AC Omonia. In 1986–87 they were trounced 9–0 by eventual winners FC Porto at the Rio Ave stadium in Vila do Conde and 1–0 at home in Malta.

== Rabat Ajax in Europe ==
Season	Competition	Round	Country	Club	Home	Away	Aggregate
1983–84	UEFA Cup	1. Round	(Czechoslovakia)	Inter Bratislava	0–10	0–6	0–16
1984–85	UEFA Cup	1. Round	(Socialist Federal Republic of Yugoslavia)	Partizan	0–2	0–2	0–4
1985–86	European Cup	1. Round	(Cyprus)	Omonia Nicosia	0–5	0–5	0–10
1986–87	European Cup	1. Round	(Portugal)	FC Porto	0–1	0–9	0–10

== Players ==
As of 07 November 2025

=== Current squad ===
Note: Flags indicate national team as defined under FIFA eligibility rules; some limited exceptions apply. Players may hold more than one non-FIFA nationality.

No.	Pos.	Nation	Player
1	GK	MLT	Jean Matthias Vella (C)
2	DF	MNE	Andrija Carapic
3	DF	MLT	Shawn Cutajar
4	DF	MLT	Miguel Vella
5	DF	MLT	Craig Borg
6	MF	MLT	Jacques Vella Critien
7	MF	MLT	Jake Lovegrove
8	MF	MLT	Shylon Vella
9	FW	MLT	Larens Vella
10	FW	MLT	Aidan Azzopardi
11	FW	ROU	Andrei Bulgaru
13	DF	MLT	Edward Falzon
14	DF	MLT	Zachary Tanti

No.	Pos.	Nation	Player
15	FW	MLT	Kieran Deguara
16	MF	MLT	Jerome Debattista
17	MF	MLT	Nigel Borg
18	DF	MLT	George Busuttil
19	MF	MLT	Andre Debattista
20	DF	MLT	Davide Mula
21	DF	MLT	Sean Abela
22	FW	NGR	Victor Ifeanyi Mbata
23	FW	MLT	Paul Magri
24	GK	MLT	Julian Borda
25	DF	MLT	Jurgen Mallia
26	FW	MLT	Aiden Vella
27	GK	MLT	Malcolm Bugeja

=== Out on loan ===
Note: Flags indicate national team as defined under FIFA eligibility rules; some limited exceptions apply. Players may hold more than one non-FIFA nationality.

No.	Pos.	Nation	Player
—	MF	MLT	Jeremy Cassar (on loan to Dingli Swallows)

== Board & Management 2024/25 ==
Position	Name	Nationality
President:	Glenn Joseph Micallef	(Malta) Maltese
Vice President	Kevin Borda	(Malta) Maltese
General Secretary	Mario Grima	(Malta) Maltese
Assistant General Secretary	Jean Karl Tabone	(Malta) Maltese
Team Manager	Luke Micallef	(Malta) Maltese
Treasurer	Darren Dimech	(Malta) Maltese
Board Member	James Borg	(Malta) Maltese
Board Member	Joseph Magri	(Malta) Maltese
Board Member	Pierre Mifsud	(Malta) Maltese
Board Member	William Micallef	(Malta) Maltese

== Historical list of coaches ==
- (Malta) Joe A. Griffiths (1950 – 1951)
- (Malta) Joe A. Griffiths (1952 – 1953)
- (Northern Ireland) Paddy Sloan (1954 – 1955)
- (Malta) Lino Bugeja (1983 – 1984)
- (Malta) Joe Cilia (1985 – 1986)
- (Malta) John Calleja (1987 – 1989)
- (England) Andy Weavill (1993 – 1994)
- (Bosnia and Herzegovina) Zijad Švrakić (Oct 1994 – Jun 2002)
- (Germany) Michael Molzahn (Jul 2009 – 11 Jun 2011)
- (Malta) Silvio Vella (12 Jun 2011 – 28 May 2013)
- (Malta) Steve D'Amato (17 Aug 2013 – 11 Jun 2014)
- (Malta) Joey Falzon (1 Jul 2014 – 19 May 2016)
- (Malta) Edward Azzopardi (6 June 2016 – 4 Jun 2018)
- (Montenegro) Vesko Petrović (4 Jun 2018 – 30 Jun 2023)
- (Malta) Paul Falzon (1 Jul 2024 –)
