= Malta national football team =

Men's association football team

Malta
- Nickname(s): Ħomor (Reds), The Knights of St. John
- Association: Malta Football Association (MFA)
- Confederation: UEFA (Europe)
- Head coach: Emilio De Leo
- Captain: Matthew Guillaumier
- Most caps: Michael Mifsud (143)
- Top scorer: Michael Mifsud (42)
- Home stadium: Ta' Qali Stadium
- FIFA code: MLT
First colours	Second colours

FIFA ranking
- Current: 161 ▼1 (18 November 2026)
- Highest: 66 (September 1994, September 1995)
- Lowest: 192 (July 2017, September 2017)

First international
- Malta 2–3 Austria (Gżira, Malta; 24 February 1957)

Biggest win
- Malta 7–1 Liechtenstein (Ta' Qali, Malta; 26 March 2008)

Biggest defeat
- Spain 12–1 Malta (Seville, Spain; 21 December 1983)
- Website: mfa.mt

The Malta national football team (Maltese: Tim nazzjonali tal-futbol ta' Malta) represents Malta in men's international football and is controlled by the Malta Football Association, the governing body for football in Malta.

The first official game played by Malta was a 3–2 defeat in a friendly against Austria in 1957. Their competitive debut arrived five years later, playing against Denmark in the preliminary round of the 1964 European Nations' Cup. Malta have competed in every qualifier for the European Championship since 1964 (except 1968) and FIFA World Cup since 1974, but have never made it to any finals of all major international competition.

== History ==
Malta played its first international game on 24 February 1957 at the Empire Stadium, losing 3-2 to Austria. That match was played in front of a capacity crowd at the old Empire Stadium. The Malta Football Association joined FIFA in 1959 and UEFA a year later. In late 1959, Malta played in the 1960 Summer Olympics African Qualifiers against Morocco and Tunisia, in which they finished last in the group with two draws and two losses. Since then, Malta has largely remained as one of Europe's weakest teams, though its fortunes have increased since late 2010s.

The Maltese international side first competed in the qualifying rounds of the UEFA European Nations Cup in 1962, and in FIFA World Cup qualification in 1971. Malta's first competitive draw ended 1–1 against Greece in 1970. Malta's first two competitive wins were victories of 2–0 and 2–1 at home to Greece and Iceland in European Championship qualifiers in 1975 and 1982 respectively. In 1979, Malta drew 0-0 with West Germany in a European championship qualifier and they met again on 16 December 1984 for a memorable World Cup Qualifier in front of a record attendance at the Ta'Qali stadium, where the 1982 & eventual 1986 World Cup runners-up only managed a 2–3 win. Another prestigious result was achieved in March 1987 when Malta drew 2-2 in Portugal, in a qualifier for Euro'88 and the side also twice drew against Hungary during the qualification for the 1990 FIFA World Cup, and recorded four friendly wins during 1991 and 1992.

Malta's third competitive win came with a 1–0 victory away to Estonia in a 1993 World Cup qualifier in which Kris Laferla scored. In October 1994 Malta held Czech Republic 0–0 in a qualifier for the UEFA Euro 1996, in which the latter ended runners-up. Six years later, in October 2000, in a group qualifying match for the 2002 World Cup, once again Malta managed another 0–0 draw vs Czech Republic which eventually cost the latter a place at the following major tournament. In June 2000, Malta played England, then managed by Kevin Keegan. Trailing 2–1 going into the final minutes, Malta were awarded a penalty, however David Carabott's effort was saved by Richard Wright. Through November 2001 and May 2002, Malta played and remained undefeated in 6 international matches and in between they won the locally hosted (Rothmans) International Tournament. During 2005, Malta drew 1–1 against Croatia and Bulgaria. Another positive result was the 1–1 home draw in a friendly match against Northern Ireland, though George Mallia missed an injury time penalty which would have given them a win. On 11 October 2006, Malta managed another competitive victory, a 2–1 triumph over Hungary in the European Championship qualifying with André Schembri scoring twice.

On 7 February 2007, Malta drew 1–1 with one of the hosts of Euro 2008, Austria. The game was played to commemorate the 50th anniversary of the first international match played by the Maltese national team. On 8 September 2007, Malta managed another draw against Turkey in a Euro 2008 qualifying match, the game finishing 2–2. On 26 March 2008, Malta achieved its largest ever victory, a 7–1 defeat of Liechtenstein in a friendly at the Ta' Qali Stadium, with Michael Mifsud scoring five goals. A 2–0 friendly win over Georgia followed in 2009.

In May 2010, sponsorship of the Maltese national side was taken on by sportswear firm Givova, who also designed a range of new kits for the team. One month later, however, the side had fallen to their lowest ever FIFA world ranking position, of 169th in the world. In 2009, Malta had a 0–0 draw with Albania at home. This was their only point for the 2010 World Cup qualifying. On 11 August 2010, Malta drew 1–1 at home against Macedonia in a friendly game, with Michael Mifsud scoring a brilliant diving header for Malta.

In February 2011, the national football team of Malta achieved a 0–0 draw against Switzerland, in which goalkeeper Justin Haber saved two penalties. On 6 September 2011, Malta won their first Euro 2012 qualifying point, with a 1–1 draw against Georgia. During the years of 2010 and 2011, Malta did not get many positive results, and coach John Buttigieg and assistant coach Carmel Busittil were both sacked in October 2011. For the 2014 FIFA World Cup qualification campaign, Malta won their first World Cup qualifying match in 20 years, nabbing a 1–0 win over Armenia in June 2013. In June 2017, Malta defeated Ukraine 1–0 in a friendly match, thanks to a lone goal by defender Zach Muscat. Malta recorded their 7th all-time competitive win (and their first in the UEFA Nations League) on 13 October 2020, defeating Latvia 1–0 in Riga, scoring the winning goal in the 97th minute.

Malta went on to deliver several good performances in the times that followed. On 14 November 2020 in the UEFA Nations League, Malta earned a 3–1 home victory against Faroe Islands, thanks in part to a great goal from Jurgen Degabriele, showcasing early signs of momentum in the 2020–21 campaign. In 2021, Malta recorded a standout result in FIFA World Cup qualifying with a comfortable 3–0 home win over Cyprus on 1 September 2021, featuring two goals from Cain Attard, a rare competitive triumph that boosted morale in a challenging Group H campaign. The 2022 calendar year proved to be Malta's most successful in recent times: across ten matches they achieved 5 wins, 1 draw and 4 losses, scoring 12 goals and conceding 9, marking an uptick in form. On 5 June 2022, they opened the 2022–23 UEFA Nations League with a 2–0 away win over San Marino, with Matthew Guillaumier scoring Malta’s opener in Serravalle and setting a confident tone for the campaign. In September 2022, Malta delivered perhaps their most celebrated recent result: a 2–1 friendly victory over Israel at Ta’ Qali National Stadium, with goals by Alexander Satariano (84') and Ferdinando Apap (87'), overturning Israel’s early penalty to secure the win against a traditionally stronger side.

In more recent years, Malta did achieve a handful of positive results. In June 2023 (UEFA Nations League 2022–23, Group D2), Malta earned a 2–0 away win over San Marino on 5 June, followed by a 1–0 home victory against San Marino on 12 June, anchoring a strong run in their Group D2 campaign and finishing second overall in the group. In September 2024, during the 2024–25 UEFA Nations League, Malta beat Moldova 2–0 away on 7 September and then overcame Andorra 1–0 away on 10 September, with the goal against Andorra scored by Ryan Camenzuli in the 44th minute. Although positive results have been harder to come by for Malta during 2024 and 2025, they did get another competitive win, securing a 1–0 home win against Moldova on 13 October 2024, courtesy of an 87th‑minute penalty from Teuma, again in UEFA Nations League Group D2. Moving into 2025 World Cup qualifying, Malta registered a 0–0 draw at home against Lithuania on 7 June 2025, showing resilience at Ta’ Qali despite admittedly tougher opposition. On 14 November 2025, in their penultimate match of FIFA World Cup Qualification, Malta caused one of the greatest ever World Cup Qualifying upsets in a 1-0 away victory over highly-favoured Finland in Helsinki. After the match, Maltese goalkeeper Henry Bonello was given praise for his "unbeatable" performance, which included nine saves.

== Team Image ==
=== Stadium ===
Malta's spiritual home is the National Stadium, the largest stadium in Malta. The highest ever attendance for Malta's matches at Ta Qali was in a 1986 World Cup qualifier against West Germany, where 35,102 spectators turned up for the match.

Before Ta' Qali, Malta used to play its home matches at the Empire Stadium, which was infamous for its hard surface. The record attendance at the Empire Stadium was 29,751, in a 1972 UEFA Euro qualifier against England.

Malta also played friendly matches at the Hibernians Stadium, Marsa Stadium and Manoel Island Football Ground.

=== Kits ===
Kit provider	Period
(Germany) Adidas	1978–1988
(England) Umbro	1988–1990
(Italy) Lotto	1990–1999
(Italy) Kronos	1999–2001
(Italy) Erreà	2001–2005
(Italy) Diadora	2005–2009
(Italy) Givova	2009–2022
(Italy) Erreà	2022–2026
(Germany) Adidas	2026–

=== Supporters ===
The South End Core is a non-profit football supporters' association for the Maltese national football team and other disciplines, including rugby union and water polo. The South End Core was founded in 2007 and derives its name from the fact that originally they used to occupy the South Stand of the National Stadium.

== Results and fixtures ==
The following is a list of match results in the last 12 months, as well as any future matches that have been scheduled.

Win Draw Loss Fixture

=== 2026 ===
26 March 2024–25 Nations League Playoff C/D	Malta	0–2	Luxembourg	Ta' Qali, Malta
18:00 UTC+1		Report	V. Thill 47'; Olesen 90+3'	Stadium: National Stadium; Attendance: 9,467; Referee: Irfan Peljto (Bosnia and Herzegovina)

31 March 2024–25 Nations League Playoff C/D	Luxembourg	3–0 (5–0 agg.)	Malta	Luxembourg City, Luxembourg
18:00 UTC+1	V. Thill 20'; Sinani 50'; Moreira 70'	Report		Stadium: Stade de Luxembourg; Attendance: 9,113; Referee: Daniel Siebert (Germany)

1 June Friendly	Slovakia	2–1	Malta	Dunajská Streda, Slovakia
18:00 UTC+2	Haraslín 9'; Galčik 90+7'	Report	J. Mbong 37'	Stadium: MOL Aréna; Attendance: 5,721; Referee: Mihály Káprály (Hungary)

5 June Friendly	Azerbaijan	0–2	Malta	Szombathely, Hungary
20:00 UTC+2		Report	J. Mbong 65'; Satariano 86'	Stadium: Haladás Sportkomplexum; Attendance: 150; Referee: Mihály Káprály (Hungary)

24 September 2026–27 UEFA Nations League	Andorra	1–2	Malta	Encamp, Andorra
20:45 UTC+2	G. López 17'	Report	Cardona 36'; Teuma 81'	Stadium: Estadi de la FAF; Attendance: 905; Referee: Joey Kooij (Netherlands)

27 September Friendly	Malta	2–0	Liechtenstein	Ta' Qali, Malta
18:30 UTC+2	Grech 37'; Zammit 63'	Report		Stadium: National Stadium; Attendance: 1,953; Referee: Daniyar Sakhi (Kazakhstan)

1 October 2026–27 UEFA Nations League	Malta	1–1	Gibraltar	Ta' Qali, Malta
20:45 UTC+2	J.Mbong 53'	Report	J.Scanlon 61'	Stadium: National Stadium; Attendance: 4,090; Referee: Antoni Bandić (Bosnia and Herzegovina)

4 October 2026–27 UEFA Nations League	Malta	1–0	Andorra	Ta' Qali, Malta
18:00 UTC+2	Teuma 49'	Report		Stadium: National Stadium; Attendance: 5,894; Referee: Mikkel Redder (Denmark)

12 November Friendly	Malta	1–1	Eswatini	Ta' Qali, Malta
18:30 UTC+1	Tuma 46'	Report	Mkhontfo 45'	Stadium: National Stadium; Referee: Gustavo Correia (Portugal)

16 November 2026–27 UEFA Nations League	Gibraltar	1–1	Malta	Europa Point, Gibraltar
20:45 UTC+1	C.Richards 81'	Report	Shaw 19'	Stadium: Europa Sports Park; Attendance: 1,095; Referee: Balázs Berke (Hungary)

== Coaching staff ==
As of 13 December 2024.

Head coach	(Italy) Emilio De Leo
Assistant coach	(Italy) Mirko Valdifiori
Goalkeeping coach	(Italy) Mario Capece
Technical coordinator	(Malta) Ivan Woods
Fitness coaches	(Italy) Luca Pagani
Fitness coaches	(Italy) Francesco Zanasi
Match analyst	(Argentina) Facundo Styk
Team manager	(Malta) Keith Fenech

=== Coaching history ===
As of 21 November 2023.

Manager	Malta career	Played	Won	Drawn	Lost	Win %
(Malta) Joe A. Griffiths	1954–1961	6	2	2	2	33.3
(Malta) Carm Borg	1961–1964	9	0	2	7	0.0
(Hungary) János Bédl	1966	2	2	0	0	100.0
(Malta) Tony Formosa (Note: One match was managed with Janos Bedl)	1966	10	1	1	8	10.0
(Malta) Joseph Attard	1969	1	0	0	1	0.0
(Malta) Saviour Cuschieri	1970	1	0	1	0	0.0
(Malta) Victor Scerri	1973	2	1	0	1	50.0
(Italy) Terrenzio Polverini	1974–1976	9	1	2	6	11.1
(Malta) John Calleja	1976–1978	11	2	1	8	18.2
(Malta) Victor Scerri	1978–1983	26	3	3	20	11.5
(Bulgaria) Guentcho Dobrev	1984–1987	21	1	4	16	4.8
(Germany) Horst Heese	1988–1991	36	3	8	25	8.3
(Malta) Pippo Psaila	1991–1993	17	5	4	8	29.4
(Italy) Pietro Ghedin	1993–1995	24	4	5	15	16.7
(Malta) Robert Gatt	1996	3	0	1	2	0.0
(Federal Republic of Yugoslavia) Milorad Kosanović	1996–1997	15	0	2	13	0.0
(Federal Republic of Yugoslavia) Josif Ilić	1997–2001	41	5	4	32	12.2
(Germany) Sigfried Held	2001–2003	21	4	5	12	19.0
(Germany) Horst Heese (Note: Assisted by Carmel Busuttil)	2003–2006	15	1	2	12	6.7
(Czech Republic) Dušan Fitzel	2006–2009	34	3	4	27	8.8
(Malta) John Buttigieg	2009–2011	21	2	3	16	9.5
(Malta) Robert Gatt (Note: Managed the team on a one-off basis as caretaker manager)	2012	1	1	0	0	100.0
(Italy) Pietro Ghedin	2012–2017	48	7	6	35	14.6
(Belgium) Tom Saintfiet	2017–2018	3	0	0	3	0.0
(Malta) Ray Farrugia	2018–2019	18	1	4	13	5.6
(Italy) Devis Mangia	2019–2022	26	9	5	12	34.6
(Malta) Gilbert Agius (Note: Managed the team as caretaker manager)	2022	2	0	1	1	0.0
(Italy) Michele Marcolini	2023–2024	16	3	2	11	18.8
(Italy) Davide Mazzotta (Note: Managed the team as caretaker manager)	2024	3	2	1	0	66.7
(Italy) Emilio De Leo	2025–	0	0	0	0	—

== Players ==
=== Current squad ===
The following players were called-up to the squad for the friendly game against Eswatini on 12 November and the UEFA Nations League against Gibraltar on 16 November 2026.

Caps and goals correct as of 16 November 2026, after the game against Gibraltar.

No.	Pos.	Player	Date of birth (age)	Caps	Goals	Club
1	GK	Henry Bonello	13 October 1988 (age 38)	79	0	(Malta Football Association) Sliema Wanderers
12	GK	James Sissons	26 March 2007 (age 19)	3	0	(The Football Association) Chesterfield
16	GK	Dylan Ciappara	12 July 2002 (age 24)	0	0	(Malta Football Association) Balzan FC
	GK	Rashed Al-Tumi	14 October 2000 (age 26)	5	0	(Malta Football Association) Birkirkara
2	DF	Carlo Zammit Lonardelli	19 April 2001 (age 25)	10	0	(Malta Football Association) Floriana
3	DF	Ryan Camenzuli	8 September 1994 (age 32)	59	1	(Malta Football Association) Ħamrun Spartans
4	DF	Gabriel Mentz	11 August 1998 (age 28)	13	0	(Malta Football Association) Gżira United
5	DF	Kurt Shaw	1 April 1999 (age 27)	43	1	(Malta Football Association) Hibernians
13	DF	Enrico Pepe	12 November 1989 (age 37)	45	0	(Malta Football Association) Marsaxlokk
15	DF	Myles Beerman	13 March 1999 (age 27)	18	0	(Malta Football Association) Floriana
21	DF	Juan Carlos Corbalan	3 March 1997 (age 29)	43	1	(Malta Football Association) Marsaxlokk
22	DF	Zach Muscat	22 August 1993 (age 33)	87	4	(Malta Football Association) Birkirkara
	DF	Mattias Ellul	3 December 2004 (age 21)	1	0	(Malta Football Association) Hamrun Spartans F.C
6	MF	Matthew Guillaumier	9 April 1998 (age 28)	60	3	(Malta Football Association) Ħamrun Spartans
9	MF	Brandon Paiber	5 June 1995 (age 31)	21	0	(Malta Football Association) Valletta
10	MF	Teddy Teuma	30 September 1993 (age 33)	56	7	(Malta Football Association) Sliema Wanderers
18	MF	Steve Pisani	7 August 1992 (age 34)	43	1	(Malta Football Association) Sliema Wanderers
23	MF	Yannick Yankam	12 December 1997 (age 28)	17	1	(Malta Football Association) Valletta
	MF	Alexander Satariano	25 October 2001 (age 25)	51	5	(Malta Football Association) Sliema Wanderers
	MF	Jake Azzopardi	13 February 2006 (age 20)	5	0	(Malta Football Association) Valletta
7	FW	Joseph Mbong	15 July 1997 (age 29)	79	6	(Malta Football Association) Hibernians
8	FW	Paul Mbong	2 September 2001 (age 25)	47	4	(Malta Football Association) Floriana
11	FW	Irvin Cardona	8 August 1997 (age 29)	13	3	(French Football Federation) Saint-Étienne
14	FW	Kevin Cannavò	9 February 2000 (age 26)	5	0	(Italian Football Federation) Spezia
17	FW	Basil Tuma	24 April 2005 (age 21)	11	1	(The Football Association) Aldershot Town
19	FW	Keyon Ewurum	20 April 2007 (age 19)	8	0	(Malta Football Association) Valletta
20	FW	Ilyas Chouaref	12 December 2000 (age 25)	17	0	(Swiss Football Association) Sion
	FW	Andrea Zammit	5 April 2003 (age 23)	8	1	(Malta Football Association) Valletta

=== Recent call-ups ===
The following players have been called up within the last 12 months.

Pos.	Player	Date of birth (age)	Caps	Goals	Club	Latest call-up
GK	Liam Frendo	16 March 2006 (age 20)	0	0	(Malta) Valletta	v.Andorra, 4 October 2026
GK	Matthias Debono	11 February 2002 (age 24)	0	0	(Malta) Naxxar Lions	v. Luxembourg, 31 March 2026
DF	Jean Borg	8 January 1998 (age 28)	34	0	(Malta) Sliema Wanderers	v.Andorra, 4 October 2026
DF	Kean Scicluna	12 September 2006 (age 20)	3	0	(Malta) Żabbar St. Patrick	v.Andorra, 4 October 2026
DF	Alejandro Garcia	21 March 2002 (age 24)	2	0	(Malta) Birkirkara	v.Azerbaijan, 5 June 2026
DF	James Carragher	11 November 2002 (age 24)	4	0	(England) Wigan Athletic	v. Luxembourg, 31 March 2026
MF	Jake Grech	18 November 1997 (age 29)	30	2	(Malta) Ħamrun Spartans	v.Andorra, 4 October 2026
MF	Adam Magri Overend	3 May 2000 (age 26)	13	0	(Malta) Sliema Wanderers	v.Andorra, 4 October 2026
MF	Jayden Roe	6 March 2010 (age 16)	0	0	(Malta) Hibernians	v.Andorra, 4 October 2026
MF	Shaisen Attard	29 October 2004 (age 22)	0	0	(Malta) Ħamrun Spartans	v. Luxembourg, 31 March 2026
FW	Trent Buhagiar	27 February 1998 (age 28)	5	0	(Thailand) Uthai Thani	v. Luxembourg, 31 March 2026
^{INJ} Player is injured^{COV} Withdrew due to covid^{PRE} Preliminary squad / standby^{RET} Retired from the national team^{SUS} Serving suspension^{WD} Player withdrew from the squad due to non-injury issue.

== Player records ==
As of 16 November 2026.
Players in bold are still active with Malta.

=== Most capped players ===
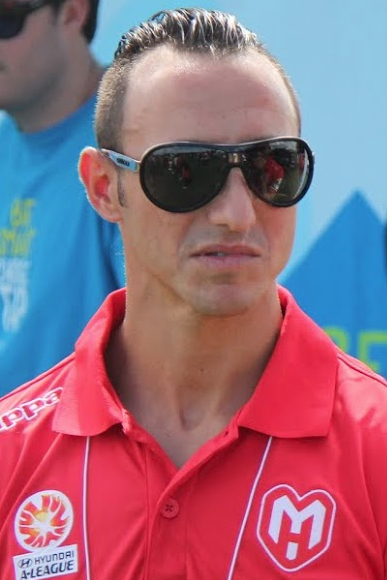
Michael Mifsud is Malta's most capped player and all-time top scorer.

Rank	Name	Caps	Goals	Career
1	Michael Mifsud	143	42	2000–2020
2	David Carabott	122	11	1987–2005
3	Gilbert Agius	120	8	1993–2009
4	Carmel Busuttil	113	23	1982–2001
5	Andrei Agius	103	6	2006–2022
5	Joe Brincat	103	6	1987–2004
7	Roderick Briffa	100	1	2003–2018
8	John Buttigieg	97	1	1984–2000
9	André Schembri	94	3	2006–2018
10	Brian Said	91	5	1996–2009

=== Top goalscorers ===
Rank	Name	Goals	Caps	Average	Career
1	Michael Mifsud	42	143	0.29	2000–2020
2	Carmel Busuttil	23	113	0.21	1982–2001
3	David Carabott	11	122	0.09	1987–2005
4	Hubert Suda	8	71	0.11	1988–2001
4	Gilbert Agius	8	120	0.07	1993–2009
6	**Jurgen Degabriele**	7	30	0.25	2018–present
6	**Teddy Teuma**	7	56	0.13	2020–
8	Raymond Xuereb	6	45	0.13	1971–1985
8	Kristian Laferla	6	65	0.09	1986–1998
8	**Joseph Mbong**	6	79	0.08	2018–
8	Andrei Agius	6	103	0.06	2006–2022
8	Joe Brincat	6	103	0.06	1987–2004

== Competitive record ==
=== FIFA World Cup ===
FIFA World Cup record									Qualification record					
Year	Round	Position	Pld	W	D	L	GF	GA	Pld	W	D	L	GF	GA
(Uruguay) 1930 to (Sweden) 1958	Not a FIFA member								Not a FIFA member					
(Chile) 1962 to (Mexico) 1970	Did not enter								Did not enter					
(West Germany) 1974	Did not qualify								6	0	0	6	1	20
(Argentina) 1978	Did not qualify								6	0	0	6	0	27
(Spain) 1982	Did not qualify								4	0	0	4	2	15
(Mexico) 1986	Did not qualify								8	0	1	7	6	25
(Italy) 1990	Did not qualify								8	0	2	6	3	18
(United States) 1994	Did not qualify								10	1	1	8	3	23
(France) 1998	Did not qualify								10	0	0	10	2	37
(South Korea) (Japan) 2002	Did not qualify								10	0	1	9	4	24
(Germany) 2006	Did not qualify								10	0	3	7	4	32
(South Africa) 2010	Did not qualify								10	0	1	9	0	26
(Brazil) 2014	Did not qualify								10	1	0	9	5	28
(Russia) 2018	Did not qualify								10	0	1	9	3	25
(Qatar) 2022	Did not qualify								10	1	2	7	9	30
(Canada) (Mexico) (United States) 2026	Did not qualify								8	1	2	5	4	19
(Morocco) (Portugal) (Spain) 2030	To be determined								To be determined					
(Saudi Arabia) 2034	To be determined								To be determined					
Total		0/16							120	4	14	102	46	349

=== UEFA European Championship ===
UEFA European Championship record									Qualifying record					
Year	Round	Position	Pld	W	D	L	GF	GA	Pld	W	D	L	GF	GA
(France) 1960	Not a UEFA member								Not a UEFA member					
(Spain) 1964	Did not qualify								2	0	0	2	2	9
(Italy) 1968	Did not enter								Did not enter					
(Belgium) 1972	Did not qualify								6	0	1	5	2	16
(Socialist Federal Republic of Yugoslavia) 1976	Did not qualify								6	1	0	5	2	20
(Italy) 1980	Did not qualify								6	0	1	5	2	21
(France) 1984	Did not qualify								8	1	0	7	5	37
(West Germany) 1988	Did not qualify								8	0	2	6	4	21
(Sweden) 1992	Did not qualify								8	0	2	6	2	23
(England) 1996	Did not qualify								10	0	2	8	2	22
(Belgium) (Netherlands) 2000	Did not qualify								8	0	0	8	6	27
(Portugal) 2004	Did not qualify								8	0	1	7	5	24
(Austria) (Switzerland) 2008	Did not qualify								12	1	2	9	10	31
(Poland) (Ukraine) 2012	Did not qualify								10	0	1	9	4	21
(France) 2016	Did not qualify								10	0	2	8	3	16
(Europe) 2020	Did not qualify								10	1	0	9	3	27
(Germany) 2024	Did not qualify								8	0	0	8	2	20
(England) (Scotland) (Republic of Ireland) (Wales) 2028	To be determined								To be determined					
(Italy) (Turkey) 2032	To be determined								To be determined					
Total		0/16							120	4	14	102	54	335

=== UEFA Nations League ===
UEFA Nations League record
Season	Division	Group	Round	Position	Pld	W	D	L	GF	GA	P/R	RK
2018–19	D	3	Group stage	4th	6	0	3	3	5	14	Same position	54th
2020–21	D	1	Group stage	2nd	6	2	3	1	8	6	Same position	52nd
2022–23	D	2	Group stage	2nd	4	2	0	2	5	4	Same position	52nd
2024–25	D	2	Group stage	2nd	6	2	1	3	2	7	Same position	51st
2026–27	D	1	Group stage	1st	4	2	2	0	5	3	▲	51st
Total			Group stage	1st	26	8	9	9	25	34	51st	

== Head-to-head record ==
As of 16 November 2026.

Positive record Neutral record Negative record

Opponent	Confederation	Played	W	D	L	GF	GA	GD	% Win
Albania	UEFA	8	1	2	5	3	14	−11	12.50
Algeria	CAF	3	0	1	2	1	3	−2	0.00
Andorra	UEFA	8	4	4	0	9	4	+5	50.00
Angola	CAF	1	0	0	1	1	2	−1	0.00
Armenia	UEFA	6	1	1	4	2	5	−3	16.67
Austria	UEFA	10	0	1	9	7	32	−25	0.00
Azerbaijan	UEFA	10	5	3	2	16	9	+7	50.00
Belarus	UEFA	4	0	2	2	1	4	−3	0.00
Belgium	UEFA	1	1	0	0	1	0	+1	100.00
Bosnia and Herzegovina	UEFA	5	1	0	4	5	13	−8	20.00
Bulgaria	UEFA	13	0	3	10	5	38	−33	0.00
Canada	CONCACAF	2	2	0	0	4	1	+3	100.00
Cape Verde	CAF	1	0	0	1	0	2	−2	0.00
Central African Republic	CAF	1	1	0	0	2	1	+1	100.00
Croatia	UEFA	10	0	1	9	5	29	−24	0.00
Cyprus	UEFA	8	2	3	3	9	10	−1	25.00
Czech Republic (Note: Includes matches against Czechoslovakia.)	UEFA	13	0	3	10	6	41	−35	0.00
Denmark	UEFA	9	0	0	9	4	32	−28	0.00
Denmark XI	UEFA	1	1	0	0	3	0	+3	100.00
East Germany	UEFA	6	0	0	6	2	22	−20	0.00
Egypt	CAF	2	0	0	2	2	8	−6	0.00
England	UEFA	7	0	0	7	1	20	−19	0.00
England B	UEFA	1	0	0	1	0	2	−2	0.00
Estonia	UEFA	8	2	2	4	10	12	−2	25.00
Eswatini	CAF	1	0	1	0	1	1	+0	0.00
Faroe Islands	UEFA	10	2	2	6	14	19	−5	20.00
Finland	UEFA	10	2	2	6	6	15	−9	20.00
France	UEFA	2	0	0	2	0	10	−10	0.00
Gabon	CAF	1	1	0	0	2	1	+1	100.00
Georgia	UEFA	9	1	2	6	5	12	−7	11.11
Germany (Note: Includes matches against West Germany.)	UEFA	9	0	1	8	3	38	−35	0.00
Gibraltar	UEFA	5	2	2	1	5	3	+2	40.00
Greece	UEFA	12	1	3	8	7	26	−19	8.33
Hungary	UEFA	12	1	2	9	6	28	−22	8.33
Iceland	UEFA	15	3	1	11	10	33	−23	20.00
Indonesia	AFC	2	2	0	0	4	0	+4	100.00
Israel	UEFA	9	1	2	6	8	17	−9	11.11
Italy	UEFA	14	0	1	13	4	35	−31	0.00
Italy C	UEFA	2	0	0	2	0	5	−5	0.00
Japan	AFC	1	0	0	1	0	1	−1	0.00
Jordan	AFC	3	2	0	1	5	4	+1	66.67
Kazakhstan	UEFA	1	0	1	0	2	2	+0	0.00
Kosovo	UEFA	3	0	0	3	2	10	−8	0.00
Kuwait	AFC	1	1	0	0	2	0	+2	100.00
Latvia	UEFA	7	3	1	3	5	8	−3	42.86
Lebanon	AFC	2	1	1	0	1	0	+1	50.00
Libya	CAF	9	3	2	4	6	9	−3	33.33
Liechtenstein	UEFA	7	6	1	0	18	3	+15	85.71
Lithuania	UEFA	7	1	4	2	6	9	−3	14.29
Luxembourg	UEFA	9	2	2	5	5	10	−5	22.22
Moldova	UEFA	9	2	3	4	7	9	−2	22.22
Netherlands	UEFA	8	0	0	8	0	40	−40	0.00
North Macedonia	UEFA	8	0	1	7	3	19	−16	0.00
Northern Ireland	UEFA	8	0	2	6	1	14	−13	0.00
Norway	UEFA	12	0	2	10	4	30	−26	0.00
Poland	UEFA	6	0	0	6	2	18	−16	0.00
Portugal	UEFA	10	0	1	9	5	28	−23	0.00
Qatar	AFC	1	1	0	0	2	0	+2	100.00
Republic of Ireland	UEFA	8	0	0	8	2	25	−23	0.00
Romania	UEFA	2	0	0	2	0	5	−5	0.00
Russia	UEFA	3	0	0	3	1	7	−6	0.00
San Marino	UEFA	4	4	0	0	9	3	+6	100.00
Scotland	UEFA	7	0	1	6	5	18	−13	0.00
Serbia (Note: Includes matches against FR Yugoslavia.)	UEFA	4	0	0	4	1	18	−17	0.00
Slovakia	UEFA	11	0	2	9	6	31	−25	0.00
Slovenia	UEFA	9	0	2	7	3	17	−14	0.00
South Africa	CAF	1	0	0	1	0	1	−1	0.00
South Korea	AFC	2	0	1	1	2	3	−1	0.00
Spain	UEFA	8	0	0	8	3	37	−34	0.00
Sweden	UEFA	13	0	0	13	2	49	−47	0.00
Switzerland	UEFA	7	0	2	5	3	17	−14	0.00
Thailand	AFC	1	1	0	0	2	0	+2	100.00
Tunisia	CAF	11	5	3	3	10	11	−1	45.45
Turkey	UEFA	6	0	1	5	4	15	−11	0.00
Ukraine	UEFA	3	1	0	2	2	4	−2	33.33
United Arab Emirates	AFC	2	0	2	0	1	1	+0	0.00
United States	CONCACAF	1	0	0	1	0	1	−1	0.00
Venezuela	CONMEBOL	1	0	0	1	0	1	−1	0.00
Wales	UEFA	4	0	0	4	2	15	−13	0.00
Total	WORLD	471	70	80	321	308	1,039	−731	14.86

== FIFA rankings ==
As of 10 February 2022

View source data.

== Honours ==
=== Friendly ===
- Malta International Football Tournament
  - Champions (2): 1992, 2002
