= 2009–10 Maltese Futsal Knockout Cup =

Tournament details
- Host country: Malta
- Dates: 8 December 2009 - 30 May 2010
- Teams: 23

Final positions
- Champions: Naxxar Motors Futsal
- Runners-up: Los Street Boyz

2009–10 Maltese Futsal Knockout Cup was a knockout futsal competition in Malta. The competition featured a knockout format, with teams competing in single-elimination rounds leading up to the final. The tournament included teams from both the First and Second Divisions of Maltese futsal and concluded on 30 May 2010. Naxxar Motors Futsal won the title after defeating Los Street Boyz 13–3 in the final.

== Tournament ==
=== First round ===
08 December 2009

- Kerygma Kristal 4–2 Capital Boys
- Lazio Supporters Club Malta 5–6 Paola Stars Futsal Club

10 December 2009

- Los Street Boyz 4–3 Zurrieq FC Futsal
- Korol Attrans 4–3 Fugazi 5

11 December 2009

- Southsiders 9–8 Valletta St. Paul's
- MaBu FC 5–4 Headhunters FC

12 December 2009

- Zurrieq FC Futsal 1–2 Sliema Bilboa
- ZC Excess Futsal 7–2 Jeepers FC

=== Second round ===
08 February 2010

- Luxol Amazon Cinco 3–6 Kerygma Kristal
- Southenders JF Security 6–7 Paola Stars Futsal Club

11 February 2010

- River Plate Bidnija Futsal Club 0–2 Los Street Boyz
- White Eagles 10–3 Korol Attrans

12 February 2010

- Scandals Futsal 4–0 Valletta St Paul's
- Naxxar Motors Futsal 5–5 MaBu FC (5–4 pen.)

13 February 2010

- Pentagon Properties BFC 3–1 Sliema Bilboa
- Paola Downtown 0–7 ZC Excess Futsal

=== Quarter-finals ===
29 May 2010

- Kerygma Kristal 3–4 Paola Stars Futsal Club
- Los Street Boyz 8–5 White Eagles
- Scandals Futsal 0–2 Naxxar Motors Futsal (w.o.)
- Pentagon Properties BFC 4–8 ZC Excess Futsal

=== Semi-finals ===
30 May 2010

- Paola Stars Futsal Club 5–6 Los Street Boyz
- Naxxar Motors Futsal 10–2 ZC Excess Futsal

=== Final ===
30 May 2010

- Los Street Boyz 3–13 Naxxar Motors Futsal

== Winners ==
- Naxxar Motors Futsal

== External sources ==
- FutsalPlanet – Competitions overview
- FutsalPlanet – Competitions and statistics

== See also ==
- Maltese Futsal League
- Maltese Futsal Knockout Cup
