= 2006–07 Maltese Futsal Knockout Cup =

Tournament details
- Host country: Malta
- Teams: 64

Final positions
- Champions: European Pilot Academy
- Runners-up: Swing Kids

The 2006–07 Maltese Futsal Knock-Out Cup was the fourth edition of Malta’s national futsal knockout competition organized by the Malta Football Association. The tournament featured a large number of teams from across the Maltese futsal league system and was played between March and May 2007.

The competition culminated on 29 May 2007, when European Pilot Academy defeated Swing Kids 10–5 in the final to win their first Futsal Knock-Out title. The defending champions from the previous season did not reach the latter stages of the competition.

Throughout the tournament, a total of 32 first-round matchups were played, followed by successive knockout rounds, including a third round, quarter-finals, semi-finals, and final.

== First Round ==
| Team 1 | Score | Team 2 |
|---|---|---|
| Corinthians | 3–2 | Children of the Revolution |
| Paola Stars | 7–3 | Sliema Boys |
| River Plate | 7–0 | Tension |
| White Doves | 5–6 (a.p.) | Mirachem |
| Stingrays | 6–2 | Classics Futsal Club |
| Amazon Pago F.C. | 7–1 | The Zeppelins |
| Aluserv Futsal Club | 4–5 | Zabbar Chievo |
| Jeepers Handyman Centre | 6–2 | Sporting Gauchos FC |
| Thomas Cook | 6–4 | AC Trampi |
| Safi Southsiders | 2–0 | Sunderland Kickers |
| St Helena Band Club | 2–4 | Drunkards |
| Southenders Futsal Club | 2–0 | Busy Bee |
| Kerygma Football | 3–6 | Clarion |
| Powerade | 2–0 | Gate Crashers FC |
| Energizer Boyz | 2–0 | Blurred Minds |
| European Pilot Academy | 2–0 | Kickers |
| KM PHS/Airm8s | 2–4 | Deportivo Santa Cruz |
| Scandals Bar | 6–1 | Rookies |
| Korol | 5–0 | Central Bank of Malta |
| Swing Kids | 3–0 | Los Street Boyz |
| Lazio Supporters Club | 4–2 | Estudiantes SMC |
| El Mundos | 2–3 | Tal-Werqa S.G. |
| RMF Wolves | 2–0 | Pumas |
| Zurrieq FC | 6–2 | Muppet FC |
| Warriors | 4–1 | ECB FC |
| Hibernians FC | 2–0 | Caracas |
| Pentagon Properties Futsal Club | 6–4 | Demons |
| Zurrieq Old Boys | 9–2 | Black Stars |
| Fugazi 5 | 5–2 | FTW |
| Head Hunters | w/o | Atletico Camarades FC |
| Micab Futsal | 3–9 | Unistars Mareblu |
| Net Stars Futsal | 6–3 | New Team FC |

== Second Round ==
| Team 1 | Score | Team 2 |
|---|---|---|
| Corinthians | 2–9 | Paola Stars |
| River Plate | 3–0 | Mirachem |
| Stingrays | w/o | Amazon Pago F.C. |
| Zabbar Chievo | 1–8 | Jeepers Handyman Centre |
| Thomas Cook | o/w | Safi Southsiders |
| Drunkards | 7–5 (a.p.) | Southenders |
| Clarion | w/o | Powerade |
| Energizer Boyz | 0–6 | European Pilot Academy |
| Deportivo Santa Cruz | 6–7 (a.p.) | Swing Kids |
| Korol | 4–3 | Scandals Futsal Club |
| Lazio Supporters Club | 9–1 | Tal-Werqa S.G. |
| RMF Wolves | 5–3 | Żurrieq FC Futsal |
| Unistars Mareblu | 4–5 | Hibernians FC |
| Pentagon Properties Futsal Club | 5–3 | Zurrieq Old Boys |
| Fugazi 5 | 2–1 | Head Hunters |
| Warriors | 7–6 | Net Stars Futsal |

== Third Round ==
| Team 1 | Score | Team 2 |
|---|---|---|
| Paola Stars | 4–3 | River Plate |
| Amazon Pago F.C. | 0–2 | Jeepers Handyman Centre |
| Safi Southsiders | w/o | Drunkards |
| Clarion | 2–10 | European Pilot Academy |
| Swing Kids | 6–2 | Korol |
| Lazio Supporters Club | w/o | RMF Wolves |
| Hibernians FC | w/o | Pentagon Properties Futsal Club |
| Warriors | w/o | Fugazi 5 |

== Quarter-finals ==
| Team 1 | Score | Team 2 |
|---|---|---|
| Paola Stars | 1–6 | Jeepers Handyman Centre |
| Drunkards | ?–? | European Pilot Academy |
| Swing Kids | 5–0 | Lazio Supporters Club |
| Hibernians FC | w/o | Warriors |

== Semi-finals ==
| Team 1 | Score | Team 2 |
|---|---|---|
| Jeepers Handyman Centre | 3–12 | European Pilot Academy |
| Swing Kids | 0–0 (pen.) | Hibernians FC |

== Final ==
| Team 1 | Score | Team 2 |
|---|---|---|
| European Pilot Academy | 10–5 | Swing Kids |

== Sources ==
- FutsalPlanet – Competitions overview
- FutsalPlanet – Competitions and statistics
