= 2007–08 Maltese Futsal First Division =

Maltese Futsal League
- Season: 2007–08
- Country: Malta
- Champions: Scandals Bar (1st title)
- Relegated: None
- 2008–09 UEFA Futsal Cup: Scandals Bar

The 2007-08 Maltese Futsal First Division is the 9th season of the futsal championship in Malta, since the beginning of organized futsal in the country in 1999.

Aluserv won the league stage, while the overall winner after the playoffs was Scandals Bar. The top scorer was Ismael Achami from Head Hunters with 29 goals.

== Regular season ==
Final league standings
Pos	Team	Pts	Pld	W	D	L	GF	GA	GD
1	Aluserv	30	12	10	0	2	74	28	+46
2	Euro Pilot Academy	30	12	10	0	2	80	62	+18
3	Scandals Bar	24	12	8	0	4	54	37	+17
4	Southenders V.	22	12	7	1	4	46	42	+4
5	Head Hunters	21	12	7	0	5	71	60	+11
6	Luxol Amazon Pago	19	12	6	1	5	48	44	+4
7	Jeepers Handyman Centre	18	12	6	0	6	77	59	+18
8	El Mundos	17	12	5	2	5	47	51	−4
9	Kerygma Kristal	16	12	5	1	6	64	55	+9
10	Powerade	14	12	4	2	6	47	61	−14
11	Stingrays	9	12	3	0	9	39	69	−30
12	Zurrieq OldBoys	7	12	2	1	9	26	67	−41
13	Wilkinson Sword	2	12	0	2	10	21	59	−38

== Play-offs ==
=== Quarter-finals ===
- 7 April 2008
  - Head Hunters 12–5 Southenders Vitel
  - Luxol Amazon Pago FC 1–4 Scandals Bar
- 10 April 2008
  - Scandals Bar 5–3 Luxol Amazon Pago
  - Southenders Vitel FC 3–6 Head Hunters

=== Semi-finals ===
- 14 April 2008
  - Aluserv 3–6 Scandals Bar
  - Euro Pilot Academy 12–6 Head Hunters
- 17 April 2008
  - Head Hunters 8–10 European Pilot Academy
  - Scandals Bar 5–0 Aluserv

=== Final ===
- 24 April 2008
  - European Pilot Academy 4–6 Scandals Bar (abandoned)
  - European Pilot Academy 0–2 Scandals Bar (awarded)

Maltese Futsal Championship 2007–08 Winner: Scandals Bar

=== Scandal at the final ===
The final match of the 2007–08 Maltese Futsal First Division Championship Play-Offs between Scandals and European Pilot Academy was abandoned following crowd trouble. The synthetic surface at the Corradino Sports Pavilion was damaged when supporters invaded the pitch and threw burning flares during the Division One championship decider, leading to scuffles and the abandonment of the match.

Scandals started strongly and established a 3-0 lead, before European Pilot Academy - composed largely of Malta-based Serbian players - responded with two goals. By halftime, Scandals were ahead 4-2. In the second half, the Serbian side narrowed the gap to 4–3, but Scandals replied with two additional goals, extending their lead to 6–3. European Pilot Academy then scored a fourth goal with around seven minutes remaining.

Shortly after that, a group of Serbian supporters ignited flares inside the Corradino Sports Pavilion, resulting in heavy smoke that made the venue unsafe. Referees paused the game, and while players and officials – including national futsal coach Michal Striz – attempted to restore order and encourage the fans to leave, the situation escalated further.

Although the individuals responsible eventually exited the venue, the smoke rendered conditions unplayable, and the referees officially abandoned the match with the score at 6–4 in favour of Scandals.

Scandals were declared champions of the Maltese Futsal League after the Malta Football Association's Control and Disciplinary Board awarded them a 2–0 victory over European Pilot Academy.

== Awards ==
=== Best Futsal Player ===
Predrag Babić (Scandals Bar) won the Best Futsal Player Award , finishing ahead of Željko Aničić (Jeepers Handyman Centre), and Noel Bray (Southenders V.).

=== Top goalscorers ===
Rank	Player	Club	Goals
1	(Libya) Ismael Achami	Head Hunters FC	29
2	(Nigeria) Basil Emeka Onuta	Jeepers Handyman Centre	27
3	(Serbia) Nebojša Mijailović	European Pilot Academy	26
