= 2007–08 Maltese Futsal Knockout Cup =

Tournament details
- Host country: Malta
- Teams: 26

Final positions
- Champions: Aluserv
- Runners-up: European Pilot Academy

The 2007–08 Maltese Futsal Knock-Out Cup was the main knockout futsal tournament in Malta, organized by the Malta Football Association. A total of 26 teams participated in the competition, which was played from April to May 2008.

The tournament was won by Aluserv, an emerging team that won the Second Division in the previous season. In the Final, they defeated European Pilot Academy 8–5 in the final held on 29 May 2008.

== Final game ==
The final of the 2007-08 Maltese Futsal Knock-Out Cup was held on 29 May 2008 and featured two of the top teams from that season's First Division: Aluserv and European Pilot Academy. Aluserv, who had finished first in the league standings and set several season records - including best goal difference, best home win, and best away win - were making their debut season in the First Division after being promoted the previous year. European Pilot Academy entered the final as runners-up in the Championship play-offs, having lost the title to Scandals Bar following an abandoned match incident.

Aluserv took an early 2–0 lead midway through the first half, but European Pilot Academy responded with two quick goals on the counterattack to equalise. Aluserv regained control of the match and led 4–2 at halftime. The second half saw Aluserv extend their advantage with four consecutive goals, while European Pilot Academy continued to press and reduced the deficit with three goals of their own. Despite their efforts, strong defending and goalkeeping by Aluserv maintained the lead, and the match ended 8–5 in their favour. The victory marked a major milestone for the club, securing a prestigious title in their first season in the top flight.

== First Round ==
Team 1	Score	Team 2
Thomas Cook Futsal	0–1	Pentagon Properties FC
Zurrieq FC	7–2	Fugazi 5
Lazio Supporters Club	w/o	Safi Southsiders
Jeepers	8–7 (a.p.)	Swing Kids
Wilkinson Swords	1–3	Deportivo Santa Cruz Futsal
El Mundos	4–0	Pietà RMF Wolves
Luxol-Amazon Pago	2–7	Naxxar Motors Futsal Club
Scandals Bar	8–5	Korol
European Pilot Academy	13–4	Clarion
Powerade	6–4	Paola Stars

== Second Round ==
Team 1	Score	Team 2
Zurrieq Old Boys	3–5	Pentagon Properties FC
Aluserv	5–1	Zurrieq FC
Southenders Vitel FC	4–1	Lazio Supporters Club
Head Hunters Futsal	2–6	Jeepers
Stingrays Futsal	1–6	Deportivo Santa Cruz Futsal
Kerygma Football	5–3	El Mundos
Naxxar Motors	2–5	Scandals Bar
European Pilot Academy	10–4	Powerade Futsal

== Quarter-finals ==
Team 1	Score	Team 2
Pentagon Properties FC	4–7	Aluserv
Southenders Vitel FC	3–6	Jeepers
Deportivo Santa Cruz Futsal	7–6 (a.p.)	Kerygma Football
Scandals Bar	2–6	European Pilot Academy

== Semi-finals ==
Team 1	Score	Team 2
Aluserv	9–6	Jeepers
Deportivo Santa Cruz Futsal	0–4	European Pilot Academy

== Final ==
Team 1	Score	Team 2
Aluserv	8–5	European Pilot Academy

== External sources ==
- FutsalPlanet – Competitions overview
- FutsalPlanet – Competitions and statistics

== See also ==
- Maltese Futsal League
- Malta Football Association
