= 2008–09 Maltese Futsal Knockout Cup =

Tournament details
- Host country: Malta
- Dates: 27 April 2009 - 22 May 2009
- Teams: 26

Final positions
- Champions: Naxxar Motors
- Runners-up: River Plate (Malta)

2008–09 Maltese Futsal Knock-Out Cup was the main knockout futsal tournament in Malta, organized by the Malta Football Association. A total of 26 teams participated in the competition, which was played from April to May 2009. The tournament was won by Naxxar Motors, the 2008-09 Championship stage winner. In the Final, they defeated River Plate (Malta) 5-2 in the match held on 22 May 2009.

== 2008–09 Maltese Futsal Knock-Out Cup ==
=== First Round ===
27 April 2009

- TC Sparks – Kerygma Kristal n.p.
- Hacienda Bar – Żurrieq Old Boys 7–2

28 April 2009

- River Plate (Malta) – Stingrays 5–1

30 April 2009

- Naxxar Motors – Wilkinsons Swords 4–2
- Pentagon Properties BFC – Żurrieq FC 3–5

1 May 2009

- White Eagles – Korol Attrans 10–0
- MaBu FC – Paola Downtown n.p.

2 May 2009

- Aluserv Futsal – Los Street Boyz 1–2
- Scandals – Paola Stars Futsal Club 10–9 (pen.; 5–5 aet)

4 May 2009

- Southenders – Tal-Werqa S.G. 7–4 (pen.; 3–3 aet)
- Jeepers FC – Powerade Lazio SC 1–3

=== Second Round ===
5 May 2009

- Swing Kids – Fugazi 5 5–2

7 May 2009

- Headhunters FC – El Mundos Valletta St Pauls 0–3
- Luxol-Amazon Pago – Kerygma Kristal 4–3

9 May 2009

- Naxxar Motors – Żurrieq FC 5–2
- White Eagles – Paola Downtown 8–3

11 May 2009

- Los Street Boyz – Scandals 3–4 (pen.; 2–2 aet)
- Southenders – Powerade Lazio SC 3–2

14 May 2009

- River Plate (Malta) – Hacienda Bar 6–4

* Original match played on 8 May ended 4–4 (5–4 pen.). Replay ordered by MFA Protests Board following protest.

=== Quarter-finals ===
12 May 2009

- Swing Kids – El Mundos Valletta St Pauls 2–3

14 May 2009

- Naxxar Motors – White Eagles 6–4

15 May 2009

- Scandals – Southenders 3–2

16 May 2009

- Luxol-Amazon Pago – River Plate (Malta) 4–8

=== Semi-finals ===
18 May 2009

- Naxxar Motors – Scandals 2–1

19 May 2009

- El Mundos Valletta St Pauls – River Plate (Malta) 3–6

=== Final ===
22 May 2009

- Naxxar Motors – River Plate (Malta) 5–2

Maltese Futsal Knock-Out Cup 2008–09 Winner: Naxxar Motors

== External sources ==
- FutsalPlanet – Competitions overview
- FutsalPlanet – Competitions and statistics
