= 2010–11 Maltese Futsal Knockout Cup =

Tournament details
- Host country: Malta
- Dates: 2 December 2010 - 27 May 2011
- Teams: 32

Final positions
- Champions: Naxxar Motors Futsal
- Runners-up: Excess RP Bidnija Futsal

20010–11 Maltese Futsal Knockout Cup was a knockout futsal competition in Malta. The competition featured a knockout format, with teams competing in single-elimination rounds leading up to the final. The tournament included teams from both the First and Second Divisions of Maltese futsal and concluded on 27 May 2010. Naxxar Motors Futsal won the title after defeating Excess RP Bidnija Futsal, who had just won the 2010-11 championship, 5–1 in the final.

== Maltese Futsal Cup 2010–11 ==
=== Preliminary Round ===
02/12/2010 Fugazi 5 vs Head Hunters Futsal 1–5 Gladiators Futsal Club vs Ħamrun Spartans FC 6–4

03/12/2010 New Team Futsal Club vs Luqa St. Andrews FC 10–2 Red Marleys vs Zurrieq Old Boys 1–3

=== First Round ===
04/12/2010 Tal-Werqa Futsal Team vs Classics Futsal Club 3–4 Valletta St. Paul's AFT vs AC Trampi 7–1

06/12/2010 Todos FC vs Paola Stars Futsal Club 2–3 Zurrieq FC vs City Boys 7–2

07/12/2010 Capital Boys vs Mellieha Bobs 12–4 Korol Attrans Ambassadors vs Pietà Futsal 9–5

09/12/2010 Exiles vs Head Hunters Futsal 6–7 Bianco's FC vs Gladiators Futsal Club 9–2

10/12/2010 Hibs Futsal vs New Team Futsal Club 5–2 Lazio Supporters Club Malta vs Zurrieq Old Boys 11–0

11/12/2010 Kerygma Metalco vs Valletta St. Paul's AFT 5–7 (a.p., 3–3)

13/12/2010 Pentagon Prop. F.C. vs Paola Stars Futsal Club 10–0 Excess RP Bidnija Futsal vs Zurrieq FC 8–1

14/12/2010 Sportsinmalta.com Melita AFC vs Capital Boys 8–4 Los Street Boyz vs Korol Attrans Ambassadors 3–1

20/12/2010 Riviera FC vs Classics Futsal Club 1–4

=== Second Round ===
25/01/2011 White Eagles Mosta FC vs Head Hunters Futsal 8–6 River Plate Bidnija Futsal vs Classics Futsal Club 7–1

27/01/2011 Sliema Wanderers Bilbao vs Hibs Futsal 3–4 Paola Downtown vs Lazio Supporters Club Malta 5–0

28/01/2011 Naxxar Motors Futsal vs Bianco's FC 12–1 Luxol Amazon Cinco vs Valletta St. Paul's AFT 4–0

29/01/2011 Pentagon Prop. F.C. vs Excess RP Bidnija Futsal 2–9 Sportsinmalta.com Melita AFC vs Los Street Boyz 6–8 (a.p., 4–4)

=== Quarter-finals ===
16/04/2011 White Eagles Mosta FC vs Naxxar Motors Futsal 1–9 Hibs Futsal vs Paola Downtown 1–7

16/04/2011 River Plate Bidnija Futsal vs Luxol Amazon Cinco 3–2 Excess RP Bidnija Futsal vs Los Street Boyz 2–1

=== Semi-finals ===
16/05/2011 Naxxar Motors Futsal vs Paola Downtown 11–2 River Plate Bidnija Futsal vs Excess RP Bidnija Futsal 6–8

=== Final ===
27/05/2011 Naxxar Motors Futsal vs Excess RP Bidnija Futsal 5–1

Maltese Futsal Cup 2010–11 Winner: Naxxar Motors Futsal

== External sources ==
- FutsalPlanet – Competitions overview
- FutsalPlanet – Competitions and statistics
