= 2010–11 Maltese Futsal First Division =

Maltese Futsal League
- Season: 2010–11
- Country: Malta
- Champions: ZC Excess (2nd title)
- Relegated: Scandals
- 2011–12 UEFA Futsal Cup: ZC Excess
- Top goalscorer: Jovica Milijić (42 goals)

The 2010–11 Maltese Futsal First Division is the 12th season of the futsal championship in Malta, since the beginning of organized futsal in the country in 1999.

== League stage ==
The league stage of the competition featured ten teams competing in a double round-robin format. The previous season's champions secured the top position to qualify for the playoffs. After the season, ZC Excess Futsal and River Plate Bidnija FC joined together, and the next season the club started competing under the name of Excess R.P. Bidnija Futsal.

Pos	Team	Pts	Pld	W	D	L	GF	GA	GD
1	ZC Excess Futsal	49	18	16	1	1	135	43	+92
2	Paola Downtown	43	18	14	1	3	126	57	+69
3	Naxxar Motors	40	18	13	1	4	115	69	+46
4	River Plate Bidnija	35	18	11	2	5	110	77	+33
5	Pentagon Properties BFC	27	18	9	0	9	73	92	-19
6	Luxol Amazon Cinco	19	18	6	1	11	59	81	-22
7	White Eagles	17	18	5	2	11	68	112	-44
8	Sliema Bilboa	15	18	5	0	13	83	110	-27
9	Los Street Boyz	13	18	4	1	13	51	88	-37
10	Scandals sportinmalta.com	7	18	2	1	15	70	161	-91

Legend:

- Qualified for play-offs
- Relegated

== Championship Play-Off ==
The 2010–11 Maltese Futsal Championship play-offs featured the top four teams from the First Division competing in semi-finals and a final to determine the season champion. In the semi-finals, played over two legs, ZC Excess Futsal Club defeated River Plate Bidnija 6–2 in the first leg and drew 7–7 in the second leg. Meanwhile, Paola Downtown FC overcame Naxxar Motors 6–2 in the first leg and 9–5 in the second leg.

The final, held on 20 May 2011, saw ZC Excess Futsal Club face Paola Downtown FC. After a 6–6 draw after extra time, ZC Excess won 4–2 on penalties (the match had also ended 5–5 in regular time), securing the Maltese Futsal Championship 2010–11 title.

Excess RP Bidnija will represent Malta in the 2011–12 UEFA Futsal Cup competition.

=== Semi-finals ===
Date	Home team	Score	Away team
6 May 2011	ZC Excess Futsal Club	6–2	River Plate Bidnija FC
6 May 2011	Paola Downtown	6–2	Naxxar Motors
13 May 2011	River Plate Bidnija	7–7	ZC Excess Futsal Club
13 May 2011	Naxxar Motors	5–9	Paola Downtown

=== Final ===
Date	Home team	Score	Away team	Notes
20 May 2011	ZC Excess Futsal Club	4–2 ps	Paola Downtown	6–6 aet; 5–5 in regular time

Maltese Futsal Championship 2010–11 Winner: ZC Excess Futsal Club
