= 2008–09 Maltese Futsal First Division =

Maltese Futsal League
- Season: 2008–09
- Country: Malta
- Champions: White Eagles (2nd title)
- Relegated: None
- 2009–10 UEFA Futsal Cup: White Eagles

The 2008–09 Maltese Futsal First Division is the 10th season of the futsal championship in Malta, since the beginning of organized futsal in the country in 1999.

Jeepers were winners of both the League and Championship Pool, while the overall winner after the playoffs was White Eagles.

== Phase One - First Division League ==
The first phase of the competition featured eleven clubs competing in a single round-robin format, where each team played against all others once.

Pos	Team	Pld	W	D	L	GF	GA	GD	Pts
1	Jeepers	10	9	1	0	61	28	+33	28
2	Aluserv	10	7	2	1	63	37	+26	23
3	Naxxar Motors	10	7	0	3	48	30	+18	21
4	Southenders V.	10	5	2	3	33	35	–2	17
5	Pentagon Prop.	10	5	0	5	49	46	+3	15
6	White Eagles	10	4	2	4	58	44	+14	14
7	Scandals	10	4	1	5	36	34	+2	13
8	MaBu	10	3	1	6	48	64	–16	10
9	Swing Kids	10	3	0	7	41	53	–12	9
10	Luxol-Amazon Projects	10	2	3	5	31	48	–17	9
11	Headhunters	10	0	0	10	39	88	–49	0

== Phase Two - Championship Pool ==
The top six teams from the regular season advanced to Phase Two, where they played each other once in a single round-robin format to determine the final standings before the playoff. The points earned during this phase were added to the regular season tally to produce the overall table.

Pos	Team	Pts	Pld	W	D	L	GF	GA	GD
1	Naxxar Motors Futsal	23	5	4	0	1	24	19	+5
2	Jeepers FC	23	5	3	0	2	19	22	−3
3	Aluserv Futsal	22	5	3	1	1	33	15	+18
4	White Eagles FC	14	5	2	1	2	26	25	+1
5	Pentagon Properties BFC	14	5	2	0	3	15	21	−6
6	Southendrs	9	5	0	0	5	12	27	−15

== Phase Two - Relegation Pool ==
The bottom five teams ended up in the Relegation Pool, where each club played once against the others in a single round-robin tournament. It turned out that the decisive match was played in the first round, where Amazon defeated Scandals 3–1, eventually finishing three points above their opponent in the final standings.

Pos	Team	Pld	W	D	L	GF	GA	GD	Pts
1	Luxol-Amazon Pago	4	4	0	0	15	3	+12	17
2	Scandals Futsal	4	2	1	1	19	15	+4	14
3	Swing Kids	4	1	2	1	13	14	−1	10
4	MaBu FC	4	0	1	3	13	22	−9	6
5	Headhunters	4	1	0	3	13	19	−6	3

== Phase Three – Championship Play-Offs ==
The Championship Play-Offs of the 2008–09 Maltese Futsal First Division began with the quarter-finals on 23 March 2009 and concluded with the final on 23 April 2009. White Eagles emerged as champions after a convincing win in the final.

=== Quarter-finals ===
Date	Match	Result
23 March 2009	Aluserv Cinco vs Southenders Vitel	7–4
23 March 2009	Pentagon Properties BFC vs White Eagles	4–3
30 March 2009	Southenders Vitel vs Aluserv Cinco	3–5
30 March 2009	White Eagles vs Pentagon Properties BFC	4–0

=== Semi-finals ===
Date	Match	Result
6 April 2009	Jeepers vs Aluserv Cinco	3–3
6 April 2009	Naxxar Motorsvs White Eagles	5–4
13 April 2009	Aluserv Cinco vs Jeepers	3–4
13 April 2009	White Eagles vs Naxxar Motors	8–2

=== Final ===
Date	Match	Result
23 April 2009	Jeepers vs White Eagles	5–10

== Awards ==
After the season, the award for Best Futsal Player in Maltese Futsal First Division went to the Serbia futsal professional Aleksandar Ribić of White Eagles. He was voted ahead of his compatriot Željko Aničić of Jeepers FC, followed by two Aluserv Futsal players: Nicholas Bilocca and Bjorn Vassallo.
