= 2006–07 Maltese Futsal First Division =

Maltese Futsal League
- Season: 2006–07
- Country: Malta
- Champions: Jeepers Handyman Centre (1st title)
- Relegated: None
- 2007–08 UEFA Futsal Cup: Jeepers Handyman Centre

The 2006-07 Maltese Futsal First Division is the 8th season of the futsal championship in Malta, since the beginning of organized futsal in the country in 1999.

The winner of the Group A were Hibernians , while the Group A was clinched by European Pilot Academy.

== Regular season ==
A total of 14 clubs were divided into two groups of seven teams each. Every group played in a round-robin format, with each team playing 12 matches. The match between Head Hunters and Net Stars was never played. The winner of Group A was Hibernians, while Group B was won by European Pilot Academy.

=== Group A ===
Final standings
Pos	Club	Pts	Pld	W	D	L	GF	GA	GD
1	Hibernians	28	12	9	1	2	48	32	+16
2	Scandals Bar	22	12	7	1	4	50	37	+13
3	El Mundos	17	12	5	2	5	50	49	+1
4	Southenders	14	12	3	5	4	40	41	−1
5	Safi Southsiders	14	12	4	2	6	40	46	−6
6	Zurrieq Old Boys	14	12	4	2	6	26	47	−21
7	Żurrieq	9	12	2	3	7	39	41	−2

Note: A decider match was played on 16 April 2007 between Safi Southsiders and Southenders to determine the fourth place. Southenders won 3–0.

=== Group B ===
Final standings
Pos	Club	Pts	Pld	W	D	L	GF	GA	GD
1	European Pilot Academy	28	12	9	1	2	87	40	+47
2	Jeepers Handyman Ctr	21	12	7	0	5	76	65	+11
3	Powerade	19	12	6	1	5	48	46	+2
4	Head Hunters	15	11	5	0	6	44	49	−5
5	Amazon Pago FC	15	12	5	0	7	46	64	−18
6	Net Stars	13	12	4	1	7	40	60	−20
7	Swing Kids	10	11	3	1	7	33	50	−17

=== Play-Off ===
After the first stage, the top two clubs from both groups advanced to a single round-robin league, with the winner being crowned the Maltese Futsal League champion for the 2006–07 season.

Final round standings
Pos	Club	Pts	Pld	W	D	L	GF	GA	GD
1	Jeepers Handyman Centre	7	3	2	1	0	15	7	+8
2	European Pilot Academy	6	3	2	0	1	16	14	+2
3	Hibernians	3	3	1	0	2	14	21	−7
4	Scandals Bar	1	3	0	1	2	8	11	−3

== Champions roster ==
The squad that won the 2006–07 Maltese Futsal First Division for Jeepers Handyman Centre consisted of the following players:

- (Malta) Marvin Spiteri
- (Serbia) Željko Aničić
- (Bulgaria) Pavel Adamov
- (Malta) Christopher Borg (Captain)
- (Nigeria) Basil Emeka
- (Malta) Richard Busuttil
- (Malta) Owen Galea
- (Netherlands) Rob De Vries
- (Germany) Michael Molzahn
- (Malta) Andrew Debono
- (Malta) Alvin Cacciattolo
- (England) Craig Pickard

Team manager: (Malta) Noel Attard Flores

== Awards ==
=== Best Futsal Player ===
Željko Aničić (Jeepers Handyman Centre) won the Best Futsal Player Award, finishing ahead of Mark Sullivan (Amazon Pago) and Antoine Spiteri (Demons).
