= Norman Darmanin Demajo =

Malta football coach and administrator

Norman Demajo
Personal information
- Full name: Norman Darmanin Demajo
- Date of birth: 12 April 1952 (age 74)
- Height: 1.79 m (5 ft 10 in)
- Position: Defender

Youth career
- 1969–1973: Qrendi F.C.

Senior career*
Years	Team	Apps	(Gls)
1973–1982	Valletta	109	(29)
1983–1990	St Andrew's F.C		

International career
1975–1976	Malta amateur national football team	4	(1)
- * Club domestic league appearances and goals

Norman Darmanin Demajo (12 April 1952) is a Maltese retired footballer who was member of MFA, two term president of Malta Football Association from 2010 to 2019. He was succeeded by an old friend Bjorn Vassallo. He is the first vice-chairman of FIFA Fair Play campaign, FIFA Fair Play Trophy, FIFA Fair Play Award, UEFA Fair Play ranking, UEFA Financial Fair Play Regulations and social responsibility committee in footballs.

== Background and Playing Career ==
Demanjo was born in Naxxar, Malta. Although he started playing football at 17 when studying in junior college in University of Malta were Qrendi FC president Joe Misfud spotted him playing soccer at inter faculty league there he was advised to joined the club playing for four years before he join Maltese first division league team Valletta in 1973 winning Malta leagues three times and three other cups in Malta including FA trophies, Independence Cup known as Testaferrata Cup and Sons of Malta Cup, most of his playing career he spent there before moving to St Andrew's where he spent seven years playing from 1982 to his retirement in 1990 at the age of 38 and then he joined the Malta Football Association in 1990.

Demanjo decided to quit professional career to join Melita FC when was just 30 in 1981 during the time in Valletta with just a little games played, he caps his amateur national teams from 1974 to 1975 playing only four games and netted once.

As a graduated business management from London School of Accountancy, before becoming member in sports executive body, he runs a business of his own being the owner of NDD Limited in Malta and was co-founder of Time2Think organization, having been member in council of St Andrew's since 1990 he became member of MFA and part of the executive body, serving as chief treasurer in 1992.

In July 2019, Darmanin step down for the new election of MFA presidency announced at the Annual General Meeting in MFA council.
