= Željko Aničić =

Georgian footballer

Personal information
- Full name: Željko Aničić
- Date of birth: 25 August 1974 (age 52)
- Place of birth: Belgrade, Serbia
- Position: Forward

Senior career*
Years	Team	Apps	(Gls)
2003	Pietà Hotspurs		
2005–2006	Lija Athletic		
2006–2009	Jeepers		
2008	Scandals Bar (loan)		
2009–2010	White Eagles		
2010–2014	Balzan		
2014–2016	Lija Athletic		

Managerial career
- 2015–2019: Malta (assistant)
- 2017–: Luxol (assistant)
- 2019–2023: Malta
- * Club domestic league appearances and goals

Željko Aničić (Serbian Cyrillic: Жељко Аничић, pronounced [/ʒêʎko ǎnitʃitɕ/]; born in 1974) is a Serbian-Maltese futsal coach and former player who played as a forward, currently a free agent. He last served as head coach of the Malta national futsal team but left the position in August 2023 was replaced by a Romanian coach Gabriel Dobre.

== Club career ==
=== Football career ===
After a spell in North Macedonia, Aničić had a trial with Pietà Hotspurs in 2003. In the 2005–06 Maltese First Division he played for Lija Athletic, which was relegated to the Second Division.

=== Futsal career ===
Between 2006 and 2009, with a brief loan spell with Scandals in 2008, Aničić was a member of Jeepers. During this period, the Santa Venera side achieved its greatest success, winning the league title in the 2006–07 season and finishing as runners-up in the 2008–09 season. In his first season with the club, Aničić won the Best Futsal Player Award, finishing ahead of Mark Sullivan (Amazon Pago) and Antoine Spiteri (Demons).

The following season, now as a member of White Eagles, Aničić came close to winning the award for Best Futsal Player, finishing second behind his compatriot and eventual winner Aleksandar Ribić.

Aničić's most successful period was from 2012 to 2014, when he was a member of Balzan and won the 2013–14 title, as well as two consecutive cup victories in 2013 and 2014. He was also on the squad that participated in the 2014-15 UEFA Futsal Cup. On 29 August 2012, Leotar's futsal department (Republika Srpska, Bosnia and Herzegovina) defeated Balzan 9–1 in the 2012–13 UEFA Futsal Cup preliminary round. The following day, Balzan lost 3–0 to Lexmax Chișinău of Moldova.

After leaving Balzan, Aničić spent two seasons with Lija.

== Coaching career ==
Prior to being appointed head coach of the Malta national futsal team in 2019, he had served as assistant to Peter Pullicino and Vic Hermans since 2015.

== Personal life ==
Aničić is the younger brother of Dragan Aničić, a Serbian football manager who managed several clubs in Serbia and Montenegro.
