= Korol =

Korol is a surname. Notable persons with that name include:

- Abraham B Korol (born 1946), Israeli geneticist
- Adam Korol, (born 1974), Polish rower
- Aleksey Korol (born 1977), Ukrainian footballer
- Anton Korol (1916–1981), German military pilot
- Berta Korol, birth name of Berta Borodkina, Soviet catering executed for embezzling
- Fyodor Korol (1894–1942), Soviet general
- Gennadiy Korol, video game programmer and founder of Moon Studios
- Ihor Korol (born 1971), Ukrainian footballer
- Jaroslava Korol (1954–2009), Ukrainian painter
- Oleg Korol (born 1969), Belarusian footballer
- Osman Zati Korol (1880–1946), Turkish military officer
- Petro Korol, (born 1941), Ukrainian weightlifter
- Yelizaveta Korol (born 1994), Kazakhstani sports shooter
- Yevhen Korol (born 1947), Ukrainian footballer
