= 2009–10 Maltese Futsal First Division =

Maltese Futsal League
- Season: 2009–10
- Country: Malta
- Champions: ZC Excess (1st title)
- Relegated: Jeepers and Southenders
- 2010–11 UEFA Futsal Cup: ZC Excess

The 2009–10 Maltese Futsal First Division is the 11th season of the futsal championship in Malta, since the beginning of organized futsal in the country in 1999.

== League stage ==
The league stage of the competition featured ten teams competing in a double round-robin format. Naxxar Motors Futsal secured the top position to qualify for the playoffs. Last year's champions, White Eagles, also qualified for the final stage.

Pos	Club	Pts	Pld	W	D	L	GF	GA	GD
1	Naxxar Motors Futsal	47	18	15	2	1	122	48	+74
2	Paola Downtown	45	18	14	3	1	96	34	+62
3	ZC Excess Futsal	39	18	13	0	5	123	78	+45
4	White Eagles	31	18	10	1	7	107	76	+31
5	Pentagon Properties BFC	28	18	9	1	8	74	78	–4
6	River Plate Bidnija FC	27	18	9	0	9	92	94	–2
7	Scandals	27	18	9	0	9	84	93	–9
8	Luxol Amazon Cinco	14	18	4	2	12	60	77	–17
9	Jeepers FC	7	18	2	1	15	44	128	–84
10	Southenders JF Security	0	18	0	0	18	48	144	–96

Legend:

- Qualified for play-offs
- Relegated

== Futsal First Division Relegation / Second Division Promotion Decider ==
The relegation/promotion decider match determined whether the First Division club would retain its place in the league or if the Second Division club would be promoted. The match was played on 10 May and ended in a draw after regular time, with the First Division club prevailing in the penalty shootout.

Date	Match	Result
10 May 2010	Luxol Amazon Cinco vs. Zurrieq	3–3 (6–3 pens)

== Championship Play-off ==
The Championship Play-Offs of the 2009–10 Maltese Futsal First Division began with the semi-finals on 29 April 2010 and concluded with the final match held on 14 May 2010.ZC Excess will represent Malta in the 2010–11 UEFA Futsal Cup competition.

=== Semi-finals ===
Date	Home team	Score	Away team
29 April 2010	Naxxar Motors Futsal	5–5	White Eagles
29 April 2010	Paola Downtown	8–7	ZC Excess Futsal
6 May 2010	White Eagles	3–7	Naxxar Motors Futsal
6 May 2010	ZC Excess Futsal	7–2	Paola Downtown

=== Final ===
Date	Home team	Score	Away team
14 May 2010	Naxxar Motors Futsal	7–12	ZC Excess Futsal

Maltese Futsal Championship 2009–10 Winner: ZC Excess Futsal

== Top Goalscorer ==
Aleksandar Ribić of Naxxar Motors Futsal was the First Division top goalscorer. Florin Anton of ZC Excess Futsal was named Best Futsal Player.
