= Aleksandar Ribić =

Georgian footballer

Personal information
- Full name: Aleksandar Ribić
- Date of birth: 25 March 1982 (age 44)
- Place of birth: Belgrade, Serbia, Yugoslavia
- Position: Forward

Team information
- Current team: MFPA (veterans)

Senior career*
Years	Team	Apps	(Gls)
2008-2009	White Eagles		
2009–2010	Radnički Sombor		
2010–2011	Naxxar Motors		
2011–2012	ZC Excess RP Bidnija		
2012–2013	Balzan		
2013–2014	Pembroke Athleta		
2014–2015	Lija Athletic		
2015–2018	Kirkop United		
2015-2017	Sliema		
2019-2020	Wardija (veterans)		
2020-	MFPA (veterans)		
- * Club domestic league appearances and goals as of 23 August 2025

Aleksandar Ribić (Serbian Cyrillic: Александар Рибић, pronounced [/alɛksǎndar rǐbitɕ/]; born 25 March 1982 is a Serbian footballer and futsal player who plays as forward, currently playing for MFPA of the VMFA League (veterans). In Malta, he is known as Alex and Alexander Ribic.

== Career ==
After winning the 2008–09 title with White Eagles, Aleksandar Ribić was voted Best Futsal Player. Soon after it, he was the White Eagles's top scorer with 5 goals in 3 matches at the Preliminary round of the 2009–10 UEFA Futsal Cup held in August 2009 in Kaunas, the capital of Lithuania.

In the opening match held at the S. Darius and S. Girenas Sport Center, the Maltese side equalized three times through two goals from Ribić and one from Milijić before finally going down 4–3 to KF Tirana. Despite two hat-tricks, from Ribić and Mijailović, the Maltese side suffered a 7–9 defeat to Nautara from Kaunas.

After a brief spell with Radnički in the Serbian First Division, Ribić returned to playing futsal in Malta. After playing futsal for Naxxar Motors, ZC Excess RP Bidnija, and Balzan, Ribić alternated between outdoor football — representing Pembroke Athleta and Kirkop United — and futsal with Lija Athletic and Sliema. Since 2020, he has played for MFPA in the local veterans league.

== Awards ==
Besides receiving the award for Best Futsal First Division Player in the 2008–09 season, Ribić was two times the First Division top goalscorer, in 2009–10 title as a member of Naxxar Motors Futsal and two years later when he scored 40 goal as a member of ZC Excess RP Bidnija.
