= 2011–12 Malta Futsal First Division =

Maltese Futsal League
- Season: 2011–12
- Country: Malta
- Champions: ZC Excess (3nd title)
- 2012–13 UEFA Futsal Cup: ZC Excess as Balzan
- Top goalscorer: Aleksandar Ribić (ZC Excess RP Bidnija) 40 goals

The 2011–12 Maltese Futsal First Division is the 13th season of the futsal championship in Malta, since the beginning of organized futsal in the country in 1999.

== Format ==
The 2011–12 Maltese Futsal First Division was contested in two stages. In the first phase, the league consisted of nine participants, each playing against the others twice in a double-round-robin format. Pentagon Prop FC was ruled out before the start of the Competition. Following this stage, the top four teams qualified for the play-offs.

== League stage ==
2011–12 Maltese First Division futsal
Pos	Team	Pts	Pld	W	D	L	GF	GA	GD
1	ZC Excess	43	16	14	1	1	144	40	+104
2	Naxxar Motors	42	16	14	0	2	131	45	+86
3	Paola Downtown	37	16	12	1	3	125	54	+71
4	White Eagles	27	16	9	0	7	91	83	+8
5	Sliema Wanderers Bilbao	18	16	6	0	10	60	94	–34
6	Valletta	18	16	6	0	10	46	90	–44
7	Luxol-Amazon Cinco	15	16	5	0	11	55	74	–19
8	Los Street Boyz	15	16	5	0	11	61	132	–71
9	Pentagon Properties	0	0	0	0	0	0	0	0
10	Hibs	0	16	0	0	16	46	147	–101

Note: Pentagon Prop FC out of competition.

Legend:

- Qualified for play-offs

== Championship Play-Off ==
The 2011–12 Maltese Futsal Championship concluded with a play-off series involving the top four teams from the regular season. The semi-finals and final were played the best of three, with a third leg scheduled only if necessary. ZC Excess emerged as the champions after defeating Naxxar Motors in the final. However, for the 2012–13 UEFA Futsal Cup, they represented Malta under the name Balzan.

=== Semi-Finals ===
1st Matches – 30/4/2012

30 April 2012

ZC Excess	8–4	White Eagles

30 April 2012

Naxxar Motors	6–5	Paola Downtown

2nd Matches – 7/5/2012

7 May 2012

White Eagles	2–8	ZC Excess

7 May 2012

Paola Downtown	2–3	Naxxar Motors

3rd Matches – 11/5/2012 (Not necessary)

11 May 2012

ZC Excess	–	White Eagles

11 May 2012

Naxxar Motors	–	Paola Downtown

=== Final ===
1st Match – 21/5/2012

21 May 2012

ZC Excess	5–3	Naxxar Motors

== Top Goalscorers ==
Aleksandar Ribić of ZC Excess RP Bidnija finished as the league's top scorer with 40 goals, followed by Noel Bray of Naxxar Motors with 35, while Florin Anton and Glenn Bonello, both also representing ZC Excess RP Bidnija, scored 32 goals each.
