= Yevhen Korol =

Soviet footballer and manager

Personal information
- Full name: Yevhen Hryhorovych Korol
- Date of birth: 21 May 1947 (age 79)
- Place of birth: Stalino, Ukrainian SSR
- Height: 1.67 m (5 ft 6 in)
- Position: Midfielder

Senior career*
| Years | Team | Apps | (Gls) |
| 1966–1967 | FC Lokomotyv Donetsk | 85 | (3) |
| 1967–1969 | FC Shakhtar Donetsk | 16 | (1) |
| 1970–1971 | Azovets/Metalurh Zhdanov | 82 | (11) |
| 1972–1973 | SC Chernihiv | 44 | (14) |
| 1974–1982 | SC Tavriya Simferopol | 181 | (18) |
| 1980 | → FC Meteor Simferopol (loan) | 15 | (3) |

Managerial career
- 1982: SC Tavriya Simferopol (assistant)
- 1992–1994: Shakhtar-2/Metalurh Kostiantynivka
- 1994–1996: Medita/Shakhtar Shakhtarsk
- 1996–1997: FC Metalurh Donetsk
- 1997–2001: FC Shakhtar-2 Donetsk
- 2006–2009: FC Titan Donetsk
- * Club domestic league appearances and goals

Yevhen Hryhorovych Korol (Ukrainian: Євген Григорович Король, born 21 May 1947) is a retired Soviet football player and currently a manager.

He was a manager of Shakhter-D Donetsk (where D stood for double) which participated in the Soviet football championship for reserve teams. In 1992 the teams was reorganized as Shakhtar-2 Donetsk with Korol becoming its first manager.

He is a father of Ukrainian player and coach Ihor Korol from Donetsk.
