= Ihor Korol =

Ukrainian footballer and manager

Personal information
- Full name: Ihor Yevhenovych Korol
- Date of birth: 26 August 1971 (age 55)
- Place of birth: Donetsk, Ukrainian SSR
- Height: 1.75 m (5 ft 9 in)
- Positions: Defender; midfielder

Team information
- Current team: FC Metalurh Donetsk (U-19 coach)

Senior career*
Years	Team	Apps	(Gls)
1992	FC Harant Donetsk		
1993–1994	FC Silur Khartsyzk	31	(0)
1994	FC Metalurh Kostiantynivka	19	(1)
1994–1995	FC Nyva Ternopil	34	(2)
1996–1998	FC Metalurh Donetsk	76	(3)
1997–1998	→ FC Metalurh-2 Donetsk	4	(0)
1998	FC Baltika Kaliningrad	5	(0)
1999	FC Metalurh Donetsk	4	(0)
1999–2000	FC Podillya Khmelnytskyi	2	(0)
2000	FC Mashynobudivnyk Druzhkivka	15	(0)
2001	FC Vinnytsia	29	(1)
2002	FC Monolit Kostiantynivka	3	(0)
2002–2003	FC Prykarpattya Ivano-Frankivsk	15	(1)

Managerial career
- 2014–: FC Metalurh Donetsk (U-19 coach)
- * Club domestic league appearances and goals

Ihor Yevhenovych Korol (Ukrainian: Ігор Євгенович Король; born 26 August 1971) is a Ukrainian football coach and a former player. He manages the under-19 team of FC Metalurh Donetsk.

He is a son of former Soviet player Yevhen Korol.
