= Abraham B Korol =

Israeli geneticist

Abraham B. Korol
- אברהם קורול
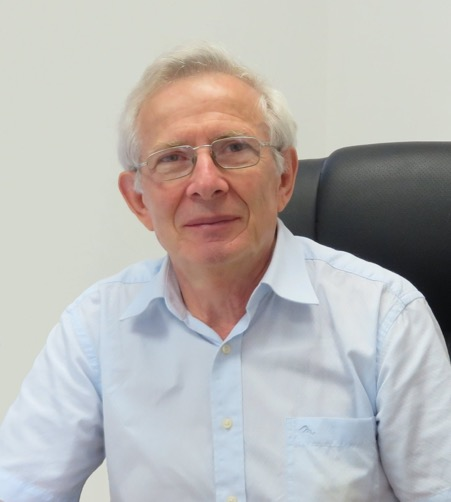
- Born: Abraham Bentsionovich Korol; October 18, 1946 (age 80); Bendery, Moldavia
- Occupation: Geneticist
- Employer: University of Haifa
- Known for: Evolutionary genetics, genomics

Abraham Bentsionovich Korol (Hebrew: אברהם קורול; born October 18, 1946) is a professor at the Institute of Evolution at the University of Haifa. He is an Israeli geneticist and evolutionary biologist known for his work on the evolution of sex and recombination, genome mapping, and the genetics of complex traits.

Korol was born in Bendery, Moldavia (now Moldova), then part of the Soviet Union, and immigrated to Israel in 1991. He established the Laboratory of Population Genetics and Computational Biology at the University of Haifa and served as the director of the Institute of Evolution from 2008 to 2013.

Korol has held numerous scholarly positions, including membership in the Human Genome Organization and the European Society of Evolutionary Biology. He has contributed significantly to the fields of evolutionary genetics and genomics.

== Early life and education ==
Korol was born in Moldova in 1946. Since childhood, Korol was passionate about classical music. His favorite composer is Johann Sebastian Bach, and the violin is his favorite instrument. In 1971, Korol graduated from Leningrad Polytechnic University with a master's in computer science, followed by a doctorate in genetics from the Institute of General Genetics, USSR Academy of Science, Moscow, under the supervision of Prof. A.A. Zhuchenko.

== Immigration to Israel (Aliyah) ==
Immigration to Israel was always an aspiration in Korol's family, leading his uncle to immigrate to Palestine in the 1930s. Nevertheless, immigration restrictions in the USSR prevented Korol from immigrating until the 1990s with the collapse of the Soviet Union. Korol was eager to continue his research and has contacted different institutes in Israel. He eventually accepted the invitation from the head of the Institute of Evolution at the University of Haifa, Prof. Eviatar Nevo, and established his new lab in 1991.

== Positions held ==
Since 1994, Korol has held many scholarly positions, including:

- Member of the steering committee of the Israeli Gene Bank
- Member of the Human Genome Organization
- Member of the European Society of Evolutionary Biology
- Member of the Coordinating Committee of the International Wheat Genome Sequencing Consortium
- Member of the Infrastructure Steering Committee of the Israeli Ministry of Science
- Representative of Haifa University in the Kamea program steering committee (alef and bet)
- Member of the Advisory Committee of Absorption in Science of the Israeli Ministry of Absorption

== Research ==
Korol's research is focused on evolutionary genetics and genomics in several target species using both theoretical and experimental approaches with emphasis on the mathematical aspect.

=== Evolution of sex and recombination ===
Korol's work on the evolution of sex and recombination includes developing theoretical models to explain the factors responsible for sex and recombination maintenance, their role in adaptation and genome evolution. In addition, Korol's group has generated and tested empirical evidences based on assessment of DNA sequence variation in natural populations aiming at the ecological-genetic regulation of recombination and mutation.

=== Molecular-genetic basis of adaptation to stress ===
Korol's study of incipient sympatric differentiation caused by microsite ecological contrasts is focused on ecological selection and premating isolation in Drosophila melanogaster, and testing candidate genes for association with adaptive outcome (physiological and behavioral) based on sequence organization in coding and non-coding genome regions.

=== Genome structure, sequence comparisons on the above-gene level ===
Along his career, Korol has developed in collaboration with colleagues novel approaches for sequence comparisons on the whole genome level (compositional spectra based on fuzzy linguistics). He has coined a new concept of "genome dialect" to demonstrate the above-gene sequence organization and its relationship with the evolution of recombination-repair enzymes. A major scope of this field is to explore genome heterogeneity in main groups of organisms where total genome sequence is available (mammals and vertebrates in general, insects, fungi, plants). Another aspect of this field is to reveal genomic peculiarities associated with evolution at contrasting and extreme environments (e.g. extremophiles vs. mesophiles).

=== Genome mapping (genetic and physical) ===
Much of Korol's work is devoted to understanding peculiarities of recombination and organization of eukaryotic chromosomes and development of multilocus genomic maps allowing reliable ordering of thousands of markers per chromosome, complemented by computing-intensive map verification. As part of these efforts, new heuristics for Evolution Strategy algorithms were developed in Korol's lab to efficiently tackle this subsequent discrete optimization problem (with complexity ~n! where n~10^{2}-10^{3}). Another complementary problem to reconstructing genetic maps is ensemble a consensus map from data produced by different labs, mapping populations or genotyping technologies. Currently Korol's group is responsible for developing new methodology for physical genome mapping in complex cereal genomes in the framework of FP7 consortium (contig assembly algorithms for BAC libraries based on fingerprinting or DNA-DNA hybridization data, and integration of genetic and physical maps).

=== Genetic architecture of complex (quantitative) traits ===
Along his career, Korol has developed methods for genetic mapping of quantitative traits including joint analysis of multiple trait complexes across the genome using data scored in different developmental and ecological conditions. Among the themes Korol's group has addressed are mapping domestication-evolution traits; genetic dissection of agriculturally important stress-tolerance traits in cereals, cattle, poultry, fishes, and medically important traits of rat and mouse. In addition, Korol has contributed to multiple-trait QTL analysis for revealing genomic determinants of microarray expression (eQTL mapping).
