= 2012–13 Maltese Futsal First Division =

Maltese Futsal League
- Season: 2012–13
- Country: Malta
- Champions: Hibernians (1st title)
- 2013–14 UEFA Futsal Cup: Hibernians

The 2012–13 Maltese Futsal First Division is the 2nd season of the Maltese Futsal League, the top Maltese league for futsal clubs, since its establishment in 2011. It is also 14th season of the futsal championship in Malta, since the beginning of organized futsal in the country in 1999.

== Sponsorship deal ==
In December 2012, the Futsal Malta Association reached an agreement with FXDD Malta Ltd, a company specialising in online Forex trading, to sponsor the Futsal National League for two years.

== Format ==
The 2012–13 Maltese Futsal First Division was contested in two stages. In the first phase, the league consisted of ten participants, each playing against the others twice in a double-round-robin format. The top four teams qualified for the playoff to determine the national champion.

== League stage ==
Balzan dominated the league phase, finishing top of the table with 44 points after winning 13 of their 18 matches and remaining unbeaten. Hibernians followed closely with 40 points, edging out Żejtun Corinthians on goal difference to secure second place. Tarxien Rainbows also enjoyed a strong campaign, finishing fourth with 38 points. Further down the table, Lija Athletic secured fifth place with 30 points, while Floriana and Sliema both ended on 21 points. Valletta and Ħamrun Spartans struggled at the bottom end, with Ħamrun claiming just a single point all season.

Standings
Pos	Team	Pts	Pld	W	D	L	GF	GA	GD
1	Balzan	44	18	13	5	0	138	47	+91
2	Hibernians	40	18	12	4	2	124	59	+65
3	Żejtun Corinthians	40	18	12	4	2	133	82	+51
4	Tarxien Rainbows	38	18	12	2	4	101	50	+51
5	Lija Athletic	30	18	9	3	6	107	77	+30
6	Floriana	21	18	6	3	9	88	92	−4
7	Sliema	21	18	7	0	11	85	113	−28
8	St. Andrews	12	18	3	3	12	69	129	−60
9	Valletta	9	18	2	3	13	57	144	−87
10	Ħamrun Spartans	1	18	0	1	17	64	173	−109

Legend:

- Qualified for play-offs

== Championship play-off ==
The 2012–13 Maltese Futsal First Division playoffs culminated in a tightly contested final between Balzan and Hibernians. In the semi-finals, Balzan triumphed over St. Andrews with an aggregate score of 8–5, while Hibernians edged past San Ġwann with a 5–4 aggregate. In the final, Hibernians secured the championship by defeating Balzan 7-2 which brought them the participation in the 2013-14 UEFA Futsal Cup.

=== Semi-finals ===
Semi-Finals	First leg	Second leg	Aggregate
Balzan vs Tarxien Rainbows	5–3	6–5	11–8
Hibernians vs Zejtun Corinthians	8–4	7–4	15–8

=== Final ===
Team 1	Team 2	First leg	Second leg	Aggregate
Balzan FC	Hibernians FC	0–5	2–2	2–7
