= Deportivo Santa Cruz =

- Full name: Deportivo Santa Cruz
- Founded: 1975

Deportivo Santa Cruz is a Curaçao football club. The team was relegated from the top division of the Curaçao League in the 2004–05 season.
