= 2011–12 Maltese Futsal Knockout Cup =

2011–12 Maltese futsal competition

Tournament details
- Host country: Malta
- Dates: 4 December 2011 - 4 June 2012
- Teams: 32

Final positions
- Champions: Excess RP Bidnija Futsal
- Runners-up: Paola Downtown

2011–12 Maltese Futsal Knockout Cup was a national futsal competition in Malta, organized in a single-elimination format. Thirty-two teams entered the tournament, which began on 4 December 2010 and concluded with the final on 4 June 2011. Excess RP Bidnija Futsal claimed the title after a dramatic 8–7 victory over Paola Downtown in the final. Just days earlier, the Bidnija side had also secured the 2011–12 Maltese Futsal First Division, completing a domestic double.

== External sources ==
- FutsalPlanet – Competitions overview
- FutsalPlanet – Competitions and statistics
