= Serbia Futsal Club (Malta) =

Serbia Futsal Club

Serbia
- Full name: Serbia Futsal Club
- Nicknames: White Eagles, Serbs, Serbians
- Founded: 2001; 25 years ago as Russian Boarding School Malta Futsal Club (RBSM)
- Dissolved: 2012; 14 years ago (Place in the league taken by the futsal selection of Żejtun Corinthians F.C.)
- Ground: Corradino Pavilion, Paola, Malta
- Capacity: 1,000
- Chairman: none
- Manager: none
- League: none
- 2011-12: Maltese Futsal League, 4th

Serbia Futsal Club was a futsal team based in Malta, originally established in 2001 under the name Russian Boarding School Malta Futsal Club for sponsorship purposes. Representing the growing Serbian community on the island, the club competed continuously in the top tier of Maltese futsal throughout its existence, operating under several different names. During most of its history, Serbia was a prominent team in Maltese futsal, winning several national accolades and playing a key role in the development of the sport on the island. The team ceased operations in 2012, by which time it was known as White Eagles Futsal Club. Following its dissolution, its place in the league was taken by the futsal section of Żejtun Corinthians F.C..

== History ==
=== 2001-03 foundation as Russian Boarding School Malta ===
The club was founded in 2001 as Russian Boarding School Malta Futsal Club due to sponsorship reasons, two years after the first official futsal match was played on the island. At the very beginning, the club was not solely a team representing the growing Serbian diaspora in Malta, but its initial aim was to unite local football veterans with those from Serbia and Russia.

Russian Boarding School Malta flourished during the period when futsal was gaining popularity across country, establishing itself as one of the leading teams in the local scene. The club's first honor came in 2003 when RBSM won the Maltese Futsal Knockout Cup, marking the beginning of a more successful era. The main honor came the next season when Russian Boarding School Malta won the title.

=== 2003-04 season ===
RBSM were once again dominant in the group stage winning six out eight games with a goal difference of 39:18. The only two draws came in the opening three rounds, against King of Shaves (2–2) and Air Malta (5–5). Nevertheless, the team secured first place in the group, ensuring a more favorable matchup in the semi-finals.

At the end of May 2004, in the play-off semi-final, RBSM defeated Vindaloo Berloni, the second-placed team from Group A, with a score of 6–4. In the championship decider held at a packed Corradino pavilion a week later, RBSM defeated El Mundos 5–2 to secure the 2003–04 Maltese futsal title. The final attracted a large crowd, including many students and teachers from the Russian Boarding School. El Mundos featured several former Malta internationals in their line-up, including Ray "Mundu" Vella, Alex Azzopardi, and Edwin Camilleri, but were ultimately outplayed by the dynamic RBSM side. Buoyed by their league title, White Eagles entered the Maltese Futsal Knockout Cup in April with high expectations.

After an opening 2–0 victory against lower-division Infomate Ltd, RBSM were drawn against Konica Minolta Gunners in the second round. Although officially a Third Division side, Konica Gunners featured several former Malta national football team stalwarts, including John Buttigieg, Carmel Busuttil, Ray Farrugia, Martin Gregory, and Silvio Vella. The Gunners had comfortably won the Third Division Section A and would go on to win the national cup. Despite a competitive effort, RBSM lost the match 2–4 and were eliminated from the tournament.

The main players in RBSM's 2003–04 squad included Maltese player Charles Zahra; Serbian nationals Boban Milovanović, Slavko Vukanović, Siniša Erak, Branko Pantelić, and Dragan Milovanović; as well as Russians Alexey Danilin and Sergei Troublenkov.

=== 2004-05 season ===
The 2004–05 season was the club's first campaign competing under the name Serbia in Maltese futsal competitions, marking a new chapter in the club's history. Building on and continuing the previous work and success of RBSM, the team quickly established itself as a formidable competitor, demonstrating solid structure and skilled play throughout the season and competing for major domestic honors until the last stages.

In the Maltese Futsal League, Serbia showcased consistent excellence throughout the regular season. The club secured the top position in the league standings by winning 9 out of 12 games, amassing 28 points, and scoring an impressive 68 goals—the highest tally in Division A. Their main competitor, Air Malta Cabin Crew, finished 4 points behind, solidifying Serbia's dominance in the league stage.

Following the regular season, Serbia advanced confidently into the league play-offs. Their dominance was reinforced in the semi-finals with a commanding 8–1 victory over King of Shaves. This convincing win paved the way to the final, where Serbia confirmed their superiority by outclassing Hibernians's futsal section 7–4 to secure the championship.

As Maltese Futsal Champions, Serbia entered the inaugural edition of the Net Stars Challenge Cup. The tournament, organized in May 2005 by the production team of Malta's first reality show Net Stars, aimed to attract new five-a-side teams to participate in the upcoming MFA Futsal competitions.

Despite their league success, Serbia did not replicate the same form in the 2004-05 Cup. The club was eliminated in the first round following a narrow 2–3 defeat to Southsiders, ending their hopes of securing a domestic double. Nevertheless, their dominant league campaign marked a major milestone and firmly established them as a leading force in Maltese futsal.

Although the club representing the Serbian diaspora in Malta were the champions of the 2004-05 Maltese league, it did not participate in the 2005–06 UEFA Futsal Cup.

=== 2005-06 season ===
In the following season, Serbia continued their dominance by going undefeated in their division of the Maltese Futsal League regular stage. The club won 11 out of 12 matches, amassing a remarkable goal difference of 95–19 and finishing 12 points ahead of second-placed Swing Kids. Throughout the campaign, Serbia registered several emphatic victories, including wins over Żurrieq Old Boys (10–3), Żurrieq F.C.'s futsal department (10–0 and 11–1), and St Helen BC (14–1), further cementing their reputation as the biggest favorite for both national honors this season.

After a successful league campaign, Serbia entered the championship play-offs with high expectations. In the semi-finals, they edged past El Mundos Fexco Western Union with a close 6–5 victory, setting up a final clash against the futsal department of Hibernians FC. The decisive match, held on 13 April 2006, was a high-scoring affair, but Serbia were narrowly defeated 6–8. With this result, Serbia missed a significant opportunity to become the first Maltese club to participate in the UEFA Futsal Cup, an honour that ultimately went to the Hibs later that summer.

In another edition of the Knock-Out Cup, Serbia faced one more disappointment, being eliminated in the first round for the second consecutive year. They once again suffered a narrow 3–4 defeat, this time against the Net Stars. In a tightly contested match against Net Stars, the took an early 2–1 lead, and after falling behind, Boban Milovanović equalised in the second half, but the team ultimately lost 4–3.

A major recognition came at the end of the season from the Malta Football Association, with two Serbia FC players - Serbian nationals Branko Pantelić and Dragan Milovanović - among the three nominees for the Best Futsal Player Award. However, the award ultimately went to the third Serbian nominee, Nebojša Mijajlović.

=== 2008-09 season ===
During the 2008–09 season, White Eagles won the Maltese Futsal First Division title after a 10–5 victory over Jeepers in the play-off final. Although they had only finished sixth in the first phase - just enough to qualify for the Championship Pool - they went on to place fourth in the second phase. Jeepers and Naxxar Motors led the table, followed by Aluserv in third.

In the quarter-finals, White Eagles eliminated Pentagon Properties BFC with 4–3 and 4–0 wins. They progressed to the final after overcoming Naxxar Motors in the semi-finals, recovering from a 4–5 loss in the first leg with a decisive 8–2 win in the second. On 23 April, the White Eagles defeated Jeepers 10–5 in the playoffs final, securing the championship and qualification for the next editionof the UEFA Futsal Cup.

After the season, the award for Best Futsal Player in the Maltese Futsal First Division was awarded to the Serbian futsal player Aleksandar Ribić of White Eagles. He was voted ahead of his compatriot Željko Aničić of Jeepers, followed by two Aluserv players: Nicholas Bilocca and Bjorn Vassallo.

=== 2009-10 ===
The club that represented a large Serbian diaspora on the island of Malta was composed of ethnic Serbs players representing or coming from various countries. Among the most notable were Željko Aničić, Aleksandar Ribić, Nebojša Mijajlović, and Ilija Milivojša. Just before the start of the 2009–10 UEFA Futsal Cup, the squad was strengthened by the addition of Jovica Milijić, a prominent Serbian-born local futsal player who later represented the Maltese national futsal team. The Eagles participated in the Preliminary round of the 2009–10 UEFA Futsal Cup in August 2009 in Kaunas, the second-largest city of Lithuania. All matches of Group E were held at the S. Darius and S. Girenas Sport Center.

== Honours ==
- Maltese Futsal League: 2
  - 2003-04 (as RBSM), 2004-05 (as Serbia), 2008-09 (as White Eagles)
- Maltese Futsal Knockout Cup: 2
  - 2002-03 (as RBSM), 2006-07 (as European Pilot Academy)
- Maltese Futsal Knockout Cuprunners-up: 1
  - 2007-08 (as European Pilot Academy)

== Names ==
Serbia Futsal Club has carried several names throughout its history. In chronological order, they are as follows:

- 2001 – RBSMC (Russian Boarding School Malta Futsal Club)
- 2004 – Serbia (Serbia Futsal Club)
- 2006 – European Pilot Academy (European Pilot Academy Futsal Club)
- 2008 – White Eagles (White Eagles Futsal Club)
- 2011 – Żejtun Corinthians FC (Żejtun Corinthians FC Futsal) - disputed

For the 2011–12 season, the old website of Futsal Planet lists White Eagles as the fourth-placed team in the regular stage, and participants of the play-offs and the 2011-12 cup. while the newer version of the site refers to the team as Żejtun Corinthians FC's futsal department. It is most likely that a pre-registration occurred during the summer of 2011, when the Futsal Malta Association took over the organization of the league and introduced several structural changes, or before the start of the 2012–13 season.
