= ZC Excess Futsal Club =

ZC Excess Futsal Club was a Maltese futsal club based in Bidnija, last time known as Excess RP Bidnija after a merger with another local club RP Bidnija in 2011.

In the 2009–10 season, ZC Excess were crowned champions of the Malta Futsal First Division. They secured their title after an impressive playoff run, defeating Paola Downtown with a 14–10 aggregate score in the semifinals, followed by a dominant 12–7 victory over Naxxar Motors in the final. The championship win granted them the right to represent Malta in the preliminary round of the UEFA Futsal Cup.

It was one of the most successful Maltese futsal clubs having won three national leagues and one cup.

In 2010, Excess became the first Maltese side to win a competitive European futsal game when they beat Albania’s KF Tirana. They then drew with eventual group winners Ilves FC from a Finnish city Tampere, to finish third in the preliminary round tournament in Cospicua.

== Achievements ==
Maltese First Futsal Division: 2009-10, 2010-11, 2011-12

Maltese Futsal Cup: 2011-12
