= Bjorn Vassallo =

Malta football administrator

President of the Malta Football Association
- Preceded by: Norman Darmanin Demajo

Personal details
- Born: 20 January 1980 (age 46) Malta
- Education: University of Malta

Bjorn Vassallo (born 20 January 1980) is a European football administrator and currently President of the Malta Football Association.

== Career ==
He started his career in as Secretary General at San Ġwann F.C. and later became member of the council of the Malta Football Association. In 2010 Vassallo was engaged as chief executive officer of the MFA. In 2014, he was appointed Secretary General of the Malta Football Association. The position of chief executive officer of the Malta Football Association was then abolished. He also held various positions in UEFA committees, and acted as a UEFA Delegate in Nice for Euro 2016.

In December 2017 he joined FIFA under newly elected president Gianni Infantino. Vassallo was appointed as Director for Europe for FIFA in 2016 and worked under Zvonimir Boban and alongside Marco van Basten and Pier Luigi Collina. Vassallo implemented the FIFA Forward Program in Europe during its inception.

He then contested presidential elections for the Malta FA top post in 2019 which he won and was given a 4-year mandate as MFA president. He was re-elected agin in 2024 and will serve a mandate until 2028. Vassallo is considered to have close ties with both FIFA and UEFA presidents, Gianni Infantino and Aleksander Ceferin.

Today he holds the post of Chairman of the UEFA Youth and Amateur Committee and Deputy Chairman of the FIFA Institutional Affairs.

Bjorn Vassallo is an experienced football executive with vast experience in the organization of sports events, strategic planning and development programs.
