= Jeepers Handyman Centre Futsal Club =

Futsal club in Paola, Malta (2002–2010)

Jeepers Handyman Centre
- Full name: Jeepers Handyman Centre Futsal Club
- Founded: 2002; 23 years ago
- Dissolved: 2010
- Ground: Corradino Pavilion, Paola, Malta
- Capacity: 1,000
- Chairman: none
- Manager: none
- League: none
- 2009–10: Maltese Futsal League, 9th

Jeepers Handyman Centre was a Maltese futsal club from Santa Venera. Active between 2002 and 2010, the club competed in the Maltese Futsal League, where it quickly established itself as one of the leading teams in the early years of organized futsal in Malta. Jeepers achieved notable success during its existence, including winning the national title and representing Malta in international competitions.

== History ==
The club began competing under the name Jeepers Auto Trader, finishing third out of five teams in Section B of the 2002–03 Maltese Futsal League Third Division, 7 points behind the leader, Zurrieq.

In the 2006–07 season, Jeepers Handyman Centre won the MFA Futsal Championship Playoffs, defeating the previous year’s champions Hibernians with a score of 8–3 and overcoming European Pilot Academy 6–3. A 1–1 draw in their final match against Scandals Bar was enough to secure their only Maltese Futsal League title. The club, founded in 2002, also reached the semi-finals of the Maltese cup that same season. Their striker Željko Aničić was voted MFA Best Futsal Player of the Year and was a finalist in the same category at the Melita Digital Malta Football Awards.

Their last known of Jeepers FC was 2009–10 when they finished 9th, one place above the bottom.

== Honours ==
- Maltese Futsal League: 1
  - 2006-07

== Notable players ==
Željko Aničić
