= Aluserv Futsal Club =

Futsal club in Malta

- Full name: Aluserv Futsal Club
- Founded: 2003; 22 years ago
- Dissolved: 2009; 16 years ago
- Ground: Corradino Pavilion, Paola, Malta
- Capacity: 1,000
- Chairman: none
- Manager: none
- League: none
- 2008-09: Maltese Futsal League, 2th (League), 3rd (Championship), semi-finals (Playoff)

Aluserv Futsal Club was a futsal club from Malta founded in 2003. The club began competing in the Second Division, where it was promoted to the Maltese Futsal League in 2007. It recorded notable results before it was dissolved in 2009.

== History ==
In its first season, the club competed under the name Juvenis Aluserv in the Maltese Futsal Second Division – Section A, finishing third out of six teams. The campaign began with a heavy 0–7 defeat against the futsal section of Hibernians, but the team quickly recovered and consolidated its position in the following round with a convincing 6–1 victory over Korol. Aluserv had a modest campaign in the cup competition. After an emphatic 7–1 victory over Chempro in their opening match, they were eliminated in the first round following a heavy 2–7 defeat to Swing Kids.

The 2004–2005 season saw more success for Aluserv. After finishing 2nd, three points behind Żurrieq, they were defeated in the Promotion Decided by another team from Żurrieq, Żurrieq Old Boys (1–4). As in the previous season, Aluserv were eliminated in the first round of the cup. After defeating third-tier side Blurred Minds 2–1 in the preliminary round, they suffered a 1–5 loss to King of Shaves, ending their 2004-05 cup journey.

In March 2007, Aluserv clinched the Division II Futsal Championship title by defeating Stringrays 7–3 - a result that secured their promotion to the First Division. Despite trailing 2–0 at halftime, Aluserv rallied impressively in the second half to overturn the deficit and claim the title, with contributions across the squad and even featuring their coach in the final minutes.

== Notable players ==
- (Malta) (Serbia) Jovica Milijić
