= Scandals Futsal Club =

- Full name: Scandals Bar Futsal Club
- Founded: 1999; 26 years ago
- Ground: Corradino Pavilion, Paola, Malta
- Capacity: 1000
- Chairman: Glenn Mayo
- Manager: Bernard Mayo
- 2010–11: Maltese Futsal League, 10th
Home colours

Scandals Futsal Club, originally known as Scandals Bar, is a Maltese futsal club established in 1999. The team has participated in the Maltese Futsal League and is best known for winning the national title in 2008.

== History ==
In the 2003–04 Maltese Futsal League season, Scandals lost a promotion play-off match to Head Hunters, but were nevertheless promoted to the First Division the following season. During the 2004–05 campaign, they finished second from the bottom in Group B and subsequently withdrew from the next First Division season, opting to return to a lower tier. The club made a comeback to the First Division in the 2006–07 season season and reached the title play-offs. However, they finished last in the four-team final round group.

In the 2007–08 Maltese Futsal First Division, the competition format changed to a single round-robin league followed by play-offs. Scandals placed third in the regular season but overcame both teams that had finished above them in the play-offs. The final match was marred by an incident involving supporters of European Pilot Academy, who caused a fire alarm to go off with seven minutes remaining and the score at 6–4 in favor of Scandals. The Maltese Football Association later declared Scandals the winner, awarding a 2–0 victory by default, and thereby crowning them Maltese champions for the first time.

=== Scandal at the 2006–07 Play-off final ===
The final of the 2007–08 Championship Play-offs between Scandals and European Pilot Academy was abandoned due to crowd disturbances.

Scandals took an early lead, going 3–0 ahead, before European Pilot Academy – a team mainly consisting of Malta-based Serbian players – responded with two goals. By halftime, the score was 4–2 in favour of Scandals. In the second half, the Serbian side reduced the deficit to 4–3, but Scandals extended their lead to 6–3. The Pilots scored a fourth goal with approximately seven minutes remaining.

Shortly thereafter, a group of Serbian supporters ignited flares inside the Corradino Sports Pavilion, causing thick smoke to fill the venue and forcing the referees to suspend the match. Despite efforts by players, officials, and national futsal coach Michal Striz to calm the situation and persuade the fans to leave, tensions escalated.

Although the disruptive fans eventually exited, the smoke made the pavilion unplayable, leading referees to abandon the game with the score at 6–4 in favour of Scandals.

Subsequently, the Malta Football Association’s Control and Disciplinary Board awarded Scandalsa 2–0 victory, declaring them the Maltese Futsal League champions for the first time.

== Honours ==
- Maltese Futsal League
  - Winners (1): 2008

== Notable players ==
- Željko Aničić
- Jovica Milijić
- Xavier Saliba
- Ismael Aboubakar Achami
- Ran Shalom
- John Cutajar
- Chris Galea
- Kevin Mifsud
- James Ciangura
- Nebojša Mijailović

== Squad at the 2008–09 UEFA Futsal Cup ==
Scandals made their UEFA Futsal Cup debut in the 2008–09 preliminary round, where they suffered an 11–0 defeat to Slovenian 2008 champion KMN Gorica.

No.	Name	Nationality	Position
1	Benny Gialanze	Malta	Goalkeeper
2	Jonathan Sammut	Malta	Player
3	James Ciangura	Malta	Player
4	Ran Shalom	Malta	Player
5	Ismael Aboubakar Achami	Malta	Player
6	Jovica Milijić	Serbia	Player
7	Nebojša Mijailović	Malta	Player
8	Željko Aničić	Serbia	Player
9	Xavier Saliba	Malta	Player
10	Jeanbert Gatt (C)	Malta	Player
11	John Cutajar	Malta	Player
12	Chris Galea	Malta	Goalkeeper
–	Kenneth Mayo	Malta	Player
