= Malta Football Association =

Association football governing body of Malta

UEFA
- Founded: 1900; 126 years ago
- Headquarters: Ta' Qali, Malta
- FIFA affiliation: 1959
- UEFA affiliation: 1960
- President: Bjorn Vassallo
- Vice-President: Ludovico Micallef; Matthew Paris; Adrian Casha
- Website: mfa.com.mt

Former emblem of MFA (used until 2022)

The Malta Football Association (MFA; Maltese: Assoċjazzjoni tal-Futbol ta' Malta) is the governing body of football in Malta.

The Association organises the Maltese Football League for both men and women and several other competitions, including knockout competitions for the top teams for both genders. The men's national team, women's national team, as well as several youth representative teams compete regularly in international competitions organised by UEFA and FIFA. These include the European Championships and the World Cup. Malta also compete in the UEFA Futsal Championship, though not the UEFA Women's Futsal Championship to date.

The MFA manages the National stadium and the Centenary Stadium nearby. This complex is based in Ta` Qali and includes training grounds, a gymnasium, a swimming pool and physiotherapy and medical clinics. The complex is also used by foreign clubs during the winter months, due to the mild temperatures of the Maltese Islands.

The association is one of the oldest and one of the best in Europe, having been founded in 1900 with the first national league being organised in season 1909–1910. There are several important landmarks in the history of Maltese football, especially since Malta played its first official international friendly match against Austria in February 1957. The result was a narrow 3–2 defeat for Malta.

It took until 1959 for the MFA to join FIFA, also joining UEFA the year after in 1960. From then onwards, Malta become an ever-present in international competitions at national teams as well as at club levels.

During 2019, the MFA also entered into talks with the Italian Football Federation and the Lega Pro to discuss the possibility of the MFA fielding a professional team within the Italian football league system.

Bjorn Vassalo was elected president of the Malta Football association in 2019.

The MFA is structured by having 53 member clubs, as well as 10 member associations. The clubs compete in four divisions; the premier, first, second and third. The member associations are specialised football associations who organise competitions for clubs affiliated to them. The member associations include:

- the Gozo Football Association – organises competitions for teams on the island of Gozo
- Inter Amateur Soccer Competition
- Employees Sports Association
- Malta Hotels and Restaurants Sports Association
- Industries Soccer Association
- District Football Association
- Malta Youth Football Association – for players under 16
- Malta Amateur Football Association
- Malta Football Coaches Association
- Malta Football Referees Association
