= Lija Athletic Futsal Club =

Sports club in Malta

Lija Athletic
- Full name: Lija Athletic Futsal Club
- Nickname(s): Lijani
- Founded: 2007; 18 years ago as Naxxar Motors, 2012; 13 years ago
- Dissolved: 2016; 9 years ago
- Ground: Kordin Pavilion, Paola, Malta
- Capacity: 1,000
- Chairman: (Malta) unknown
- Coach: unknown
- League: Maltese Futsal League
- 2015–16: 4th place; play-off semi-final
Home colours	Away colours

Lija Athletic was a futsal team from the town of Lija, Malta. It operated as the futsal section of the broader Lija Athletic F.C., primarily competing in the Maltese Futsal League throughout the early 2010s. The club originally started competing in 2007, under the name of Naxxar Motors Futsal.

== History ==
=== As Naxxar Motors ===
Naxxar Motors Futsal Club started competing in the Maltese futsal system during the 2007–08 season, finishing as runners-up in Section A of the Second Division, which secured them promotion to the First Division. Two of their victories were among the most convincing ones in the League that season, against Pietà RMF Wolves 6–1 and Paola Stars 5–0. In the 2007-08 season, Naxxar Motors had limited success in the cup competition. The team opened with a convincing 7–2 victory over Luxol Amazon-Pago, but their cup run was cut short in the subsequent round following a 5–2 defeat to Scandals Bar.

The next season Naxxar finished 3rd in the league stage earning its place in the Championship Pool - a single round-robin competition reserved for the top six teams. Naxxar went on to finish second in the pool, securing a spot in the playoffs. This allowed Naxxar Motors to advance directly to the semi-finals, where they awaited the winner of the match between White Eagles and Pentagon Properties BFC. After losing the first leg 4–5, the Serbs defeated Naxxar convincingly in the second leg with a score of 8–2, securing their place in the final. Particularly disappointing was the early elimination from the cup competition, where Aluserv suffered a 2–1 defeat to Los Street Boyz in the first round.

=== As Lija Athletic ===
Beginning with the 2012–13 season, Lija Athletic F. C. established a futsal section following an amalgamation agreement with Naxxar Motors Futsal. Before the merger, Naxxar Motors had been one of the leading futsal teams in Malta, having secured several major honours and competed regularly at the top level of domestic futsal. Brian Spiteri was appointed as the coach. Lija Athletic, formerly known as Naxxar Motors, made a flying start to the FMA Premier League in their first match under their new name by defeating Valletta FC Futsal 7–1, with captain Jovica Milijić scoring a hat‑trick.

The club gained prominence during the first season under the new name and management, when it reached the Elite Round of the domestic league and began attracting futsal players of international calibre. Among its most notable players was Jovica Milijić, a Serbian-born Malta international, who played for the club before moving on to futsal giants Balzan in 2013. After take a place of Naxxar Motors, Lija Athletic had the first chance for the trophy, facing Balzan in the 2012 Maltese Futsal Super Cup, but suffered a 5–4 defeat.

They saw an early exit from the 2014–15 cup following a heavy first-round defeat to Balzan. In the following season, Lija Athletic advanced through the early knockout rounds by defeating Msida 5–1 and Mdina 9–3, reaching the semi-finals of the competition. Their run ended there after a loss to Ħamrun, who progressed to the final.

== Players ==
=== Current squad (2015–2016) ===
This was the last known squad for Lija Athletic Futsal.

No.	Name	Position	Nationality
1	Stefan Vella	Goalkeeper	Malta
7	Chris Cardona	–	Malta
8	Redeemer Borg	–	Malta
9	Darren Aitchison	–	Malta
10	Kurt Bartolo	–	Malta
12	Wallace Oliveira	–	Brazil
13	Jason Gauci	–	Malta
14	Dexter O'Brien	–	Malta
18	Bryan Deguara	–	Malta
20	Gary Iquanez	–	Malta
21	Matthew Xerxen	Goalkeeper	Malta
22	Bernard Camilleri	Goalkeeper	Malta
24	Luke Stivala	–	Malta
77	Niki Delre	–	Malta
99	Javier Montes Burgos	–	Spain

== Notable players ==
(Malta) (Serbia) Jovica Milijić

== Honours ==
- Maltese Futsal Super Cup: Runners-up 2012–13
