= Gareth Sciberras =

Maltese footballer

Personal information
- Full name: Gareth Sciberras
- Date of birth: 29 March 1983 (age 43)
- Place of birth: Pietà, Malta
- Height: 5 ft 10 in (1.78 m)
- Position: Midfielder

Youth career
- San Gwann

Senior career*
Years	Team	Apps	(Gls)
2000–2005	Pietà Hotspurs	103	(4)
2005–2011	Marsaxlokk	77	(3)
2011–2017	Birkirkara	151	(5)

International career^{‡}
- Malta U16
- Malta U18
- Malta U19
	Malta U21	20	(0)
2003–2017	Malta	49	(0)
- * Club domestic league appearances and goals as of 28 December 2017 ‡ National team caps and goals as of 28 December 2016

Gareth Sciberras (born 29 March 1983 in Pietà, Malta) is a professional footballer currently playing as a midfielder.

== Playing career ==
=== Pietà Hotspurs ===
Gareth was spotted playing for the San Gwann youth team and joined Pietà Hotspurs for the 2000–01 season. Sciberras almost instantly slotted into the Pietà Hotspurs midfield, in his first season with his new club he made 18 appearances, but failed to score any goals, as Pietà Hotspurs finished in 7th position in the Maltese Premier League.

For the 2001–02 season, Gareth helped Pietà Hotspurs to another 7th-place finish in the Maltese Premier League, making 20 appearances, but again failed to score any goals.

Gareth went into the 2002–03 season, hoping to help Pietà Hotspurs to a higher league finish, which the club achieved as Pietà Hotspurs recorded a 5th-place finish in the Maltese Premier League, with Sciberras making 26 appearances, but failed to score any goals.

The 2003–04 season, was Sciberras' fourth with Pietà Hotspurs, again Gareth was heavily involved in the team's fortunes throughout the season, making 26 appearances and scoring his first two goals for the club, helping them to another 5th-place finish in the Maltese Premier League.

The 2004–05 season proved to be Gareth's last as a Pietà Hotspurs player, he helped the club to a 7th-place finish in the Maltese Premier League, making 13 appearances and scoring another two goals.

=== Marsaxlokk ===
Gareth Sciberras left Pietà Hotspurs and joined fellow Maltese Premier League team Marsaxlokk for the 2005–06 season, following an impressive season he helped his new club to their highest finish in their history, as they finished in 3rd position in Maltese Premier League, with Gareth making 12 appearances, but failing to score any goals.

The 2006–07 season proved to be the most successful season in Gareth's career. During the season, Sciberras made 25 appearances, and scored two goals, as Marsaxlokk were crowned as champions of the Maltese Premier League for the first time in the club's history.

For the 2007–08 Marsaxlokk were to some degree victims of their own success, following the previous season's triumph. The squad was weakened as many of the club's star players moved on to pastures new, this left the club short of talent, Sciberras stuck around and despite the club's loss of players, they still managed to record a very creditable 2nd-place finish in the Maltese Premier League, with Gareth making 15 appearances and scoring one goal.

Gareth went into the 2008–09 season hoping to help Marsaxlokk gain some more silverware, however the club had an extremely disappointing start to the season by their own high standards, and only managed to gain a place in the championship pool by beating Msida Saint-Joseph in the final game of the first round. Sciberras made 25 appearances, but failed to score any goals during the season. Despite the club's extremely disappointing start to the season, they managed to finish the season in 4th position in the Maltese Premier League.

For the 2009–10 season, Marsaxlokk were due to play in the Maltese Premier League, however following a guilty verdict on corruption case from the previous season, Marsaxlokk were demoted to the Maltese First Division, despite this Gareth stayed with the club.

== International career ==
Sciberras has gained 52 caps for Malta.

On 11 December 2003, Gareth made his international debut for Malta in a friendly match against Poland; Malta lost the game 4–0. His last appearance for the Maltese national team was on 26 March 2017 in a 1–3 loss against Slovakia.

== Honours ==
=== Marsaxlokk ===
Winner

- 2006/07 Maltese Premier League
- 2009/10 Maltese First Division

=== Birkirkara ===
Winner

- 2012/13 Maltese Premier League

== Career statistics ==
Statistics accurate as of match played 1 August 2012.

Club performance			League		Cup		League Cup		Continental		Total	
Season	Club	League	Apps	Goals	Apps	Goals	Apps	Goals	Apps	Goals	Apps	Goals
Malta			League		Maltese Cup		League Cup		Europe		Total	
2000–01	Pietà Hotspurs	Maltese Premier League	18	0	0	0	0	0	0	0	18	0
2001–02	Pietà Hotspurs	Maltese Premier League	20	0	0	0	0	0	0	0	20	0
2002–03	Pietà Hotspurs	Maltese Premier League	26	0	0	0	0	0	0	0	26	0
2003–04	Pietà Hotspurs	Maltese Premier League	26	2	0	0	0	0	0	0	26	2
2004–05	Pietà Hotspurs	Maltese Premier League	13	2	0	0	0	0	0	0	13	2
2005–06	Marsaxlokk	Maltese Premier League	12	0	0	0	0	0	0	0	12	0
2006–07	Marsaxlokk	Maltese Premier League	25	2	0	0	0	0	0	0	25	2
2007–08	Marsaxlokk	Maltese Premier League	15	1	0	0	0	0	2	0	17	1
2008–09	Marsaxlokk	Maltese Premier League	25	0	0	0	0	0	2	0	27	0
2009–10	Marsaxlokk	Maltese First Division	0	0	0	0	0	0	0	0	0	0
2010–11	Marsaxlokk	Maltese Premier League	26	2	2	0	0	0	0	0	28	2
2011–12	Birkirkara	Maltese Premier League	31	0	1	1	0	0	2	0	34	1
Total	Malta		237	9	3	1	0	0	6	0	246	10
Career total			237	9	3	1	0	0	6	0	246	10
