= 2011–12 Maltese First Division =

Maltese First Division
- Season: 2011–12

The 2011–12 Maltese First Division (also known as 2011–12 BOV 1st Division due to sponsorship reasons) Started on 9 September 2011 and ended on 13 May 2012.

== Teams ==
These teams contested the Maltese First Division 2011-12 season:

- Birżebbuġa St. Peter's
- Dingli Swallows
- Lija Athletic
- Melita
- Naxxar Lions
- Pietà Hotspurs
- Rabat Ajax
- St. Andrews F.C.
- St. George's F.C
- St. Patrick F.C
- Vittoriosa Stars
- Żejtun Corinthians

== Changes from previous season ==
- Balzan Youths, Mqabba and Mosta were promoted to the 2011–12 Maltese Premier League. They were replaced with Vittoriosa Stars, relegated from 2010–11 Maltese Premier League
- Msida Saint-Joseph were relegated to the 2011–12 Maltese Second Division. They were replaced with Zejtun Corinthians, Rabat Ajax, Naxxar Lions, Birżebbuġa St. Peter's and St. Patrick all promoted from 2010–11 Maltese Second Division.

== Final league table ==
Pos	Team	Pld	W	D	L	GF	GA	GD	Pts	Promotion or relegation
1	Melita (C)	22	14	5	3	46	23	+23	47	Promotion to 2012–13 Maltese Premier League
2	Rabat Ajax (P)	22	14	3	5	26	12	+14	45	Promotion to 2012–13 Maltese Premier League
3	Pietà Hotspurs	22	12	2	8	27	19	+8	38	
4	Żejtun Corinthians	22	11	3	8	29	21	+8	36	
5	Vittoriosa Stars	22	9	7	6	38	25	+13	34	
6	Naxxar Lions	22	9	6	7	32	32	0	33	
7	Lija Athletic	22	8	5	9	26	25	+1	29	
8	St. Andrews	22	8	3	11	24	30	−6	27	
9	Birżebbuġa St. Peter's	22	7	2	13	31	40	−9	23	
10	Dingli Swallows	22	6	4	12	16	30	−14	22	
11	St. Patrick (R)	22	5	4	13	18	37	−19	19	Relegation to 2012–13 Maltese Second Division
12	St. George's (R)	22	5	4	13	19	39	−20	19	Relegation to 2012–13 Maltese Second Division

(C) Champions; (P) Promoted; (R) Relegated

== Results ==
Home \ Away	BBĠ	DIN	LJA	MEL	NAX	PIE	RAB	STA	STG	STP	VIT	ŻEJ
Birżebbuġa St. Peter's	—	1–2	0–1	3–2	1–3	1–2	0–2	2–2	2–1	0–1	2–1	3–1
Dingli Swallows	2–1	—	0–2	0–3	0–2	0–1	0–1	2–1	0–2	3–0	1–3	0–2
Lija Athletic	2–3	1–1	—	1–1	0–1	1–0	0–1	3–1	4–1	0–1	0–0	0–0
Melita	2–1	4–0	4–3	—	1–1	3–1	1–0	4–2	2–1	2–1	1–1	5–0
Naxxar Lions	4–2	1–1	0–0	2–2	—	1–3	1–2	1–4	5–0	1–1	0–3	2–1
Pietà Hotspurs	4–3	1–0	2–0	1–0	4–0	—	0–1	2–0	0–2 (Note: St Georges awarded points after winning protest against Pieta)	2–1	0–2	0–1
Rabat Ajax	0–0	2–0	1–0	3–0	0–2	0–1	—	1–0	0–0	1–2	3–1	2–3
St. Andrews	1–0	1–1	1–3	0–0	2–1	1–0	0–1	—	0–1	0–1	2–1	1–0
St. George's	0–2	0–2	1–2	0–2	2–0	0–0	0–2	1–2	—	0–0	0–0	1–4
St. Patrick	1–3	0–0	1–3	1–2	1–2	1–0	0–1	1–2	1–3	—	1–1	1–3
Vittoriosa Stars	5–1	0–1	4–0	1–4	1–1	1–3	1–1	2–1	4–2	4–1	—	0–0
Zejtun Corinthians	1–0	1–0	1–0	0–1	0–1	0–0	0–1	2–0	5–1	4–0	0–2	—

Legend: Blue = home team win; Yellow = draw; Red = away team win.

== Top scorers ==
As of 13 May 2012

Rank	Player	Club	Goals
1	(Brazil) Marcelo Pereira	Vittoriosa Stars	14
1	(Malta) Darren Falzon	Naxxar Lions	14
3	(Malta) Kenneth Abela	Żejtun Corinthians	13
4	(Brazil) Vinicius Pereira dos Santos	Pieta Hotspurs	8
4	(Malta) Julian Galea	Melita	8
4	(Malta) Quelin Refalo	Pietà Hotspurs	8
7	(Malta) Adam Smeir	Rabat Ajax	7
7	(Malta) Ryan Micallef	Rabat Ajax	7
7	(Malta) Kane Micallef	Melita	7
