= 2010–11 Maltese Second Division =

Maltese Second Division
- Season: 2010–11

The 2010–11 Maltese Second Division started in September 2010 and will end in May 2011. St. Patrick and San Gwann were relegated from the 2009–10 Maltese First Division. Zejtun Corinthians, Mgarr United and Naxxar Lions were promoted from 2009–10 Maltese Third Division.

== Participating teams ==
- Birzebbuga St.Peters
- Gzira United
- Mellieha
- Mgarr United
- Naxxar Lions
- Rabat Ajax
- San Gwann
- Senglea Athletic
- St. Patrick
- Zebbug Rangers
- Zejtun Corinthians
- Zurrieq

== Changes from previous season ==
- Lija Athletic and St. Andrews were promoted to 2010–11 Maltese First Division. They were replaced with St. Patrick and San Gwann, both relegated from 2009–10 Maltese First Division
- Santa Venera Lightning, Gharghur and Gozo FC were relegated to 2010–11 Maltese Third Division. They were replaced with Zejtun Corinthians, Mgarr United and Naxxar Lions, all promoted from the 2009–10 Maltese Third Division.

== Final league table ==
Pos	Team	Pld	W	D	L	GF	GA	GD	Pts	Promotion or relegation
1	Zejtun Corinthians (C)	22	16	4	2	42	11	+31	52	Champions and promotion to 2011–12 Maltese First Division
2	Rabat Ajax (P)	22	12	5	5	45	12	+33	41	Promotion to 2011–12 Maltese First Division
3	Naxxar Lions (P)	22	12	4	6	43	26	+17	40	Promotion to 2011–12 Maltese First Division
4	Birzebbuga St.Peters (P)	22	11	4	7	31	28	+3	37	Promotion to 2011–12 Maltese First Division
5	St. Patrick (P)	22	11	3	8	31	32	−1	36	Promotion to 2011–12 Maltese First Division
6	Mellieha	22	11	3	8	30	20	+10	36	
7	San Gwann	22	9	4	9	33	40	−7	31	
8	Zebbug Rangers	22	8	3	11	30	40	−10	27	
9	Zurrieq	22	6	5	11	27	41	−14	23	
10	Senglea Athletic	22	5	4	13	32	42	−10	19	
11	Gzira United	22	4	6	12	33	51	−18	18	
12	Mgarr United (R)	22	4	1	17	16	50	−34	13	Relegation to 2011–12 Maltese Third Division

(C) Champions; (P) Promoted; (R) Relegated

Decider for promotion to Maltese First Division 2011–12

9 May 2011
19:00

Mellieha	0-1	St. Patrick
		G.BARRY 83 MIN

Centenary Stadium Ta' Qali, Ta' Qali, Malta

A Decider was needed between St. Patrick and Mellieha because they both ended with 36 points. Therefore, a Promotion decider for the Maltese First Division. The game was won by St. Patrick in the final minutes of the game. Glenn Barry Scored the only Goal.

== Top scorers ==
Goals	Player	Team
22	(Malta) Timmy Thomas	Zebbug Rangers
19	(Malta) Justin Felice	Rabat Ajax F.C.
14	(Brazil) Andre Rocha da Silva	Naxxar Lions F.C.
14	(Malta) Darren Falzon	Naxxar Lions F.C.
10	(Malta) Shaun Vella	San Gwann F.C.

== Results ==
Home \ Away	BIR	GZI	MEL	MGA	NAX	RAB	SGW	SEN	STP	ZEB	ZEJ	ZUR
Birzebbuga		0–0	1–0	2–1	1–5	1–1	3–0	2–0	1–0	2–1	0–1	6–1
Gzira	2–3		1–2	4–0	3–2	1–5	2–5	2–2	1–3	2–2	2–3	2–2
Mellieha	0–0	2–0		6–0	0–1	0–0	4–0	2–2	3–1	0–3	0–1	1–2
Mgarr	1–2	2–0	1–2		2–1	0–1	1–4	1–5	0–4	0–1	0–1	1–3
Naxxar	4–1	3–0	2–0	3–2		0–1	4–0	4–0	2–2	3–2	0–1	3–2
Rabat	1–1	7–2	0–1	0–1	2–0		0–1	4–0	0–0	2–0	0–0	2–0
San Gwann	1–0	2–1	2–1	2–1	0–0	1–4		6–3	1–2	1–1	1–1	1–1
Senglea	4–0	2–2	0–1	0–1	2–3	1–0	0–2		7–1	0–2	1–2	0–4
St.Patrick	2–0	1–1	0–1	2–0	3–0	0–4	3–1	1–0		3–0	0–4	2–0
Zebbug	0–3	3–1	0–1	4–0	2–3	1–7	1–0	2–1	0–1		0–3	1–1
Zejtun	3–1	0–1	1–0	3–1	0–0	1–0	3–0	0–0	4–0	6–1		0–2
Zurrieq	0–1	0–3	2–3	0–0	0–0	0–4	4–2	0–2	2–0	0–3	1–4	

Legend: Blue = home team win; Yellow = draw; Red = away team win.
