= 2010–11 Maltese First Division =

Maltese First Division
- Season: 2010–11
- Matches played: 56
- Goals scored: 161 (2.88 per match)
- Top goalscorer: Simon Shead; Mosta F.C. (11 goals)
- Highest scoring: Pietà 6–1 Dingli; St. George's 3–4 Balzan; Balzan 4–3 Pieta

The 2010–11 Maltese First Division (also known as 2010–11 BOV 1st Division due to sponsorship reasons) began on 23 October 2010 and ended on 1 May 2011.

Due to a in-season change regarding the league system, the third-placed team of this season will be promoted to the Maltese Premier League, along with the regular two promotees.

== Teams ==
These teams will contest the 2010–11 season:

- Balzan Youths
- Dingli Swallows
- Lija Athletic
- Melita
- Mosta
- Mqabba
- Msida Saint-Joseph
- Pietà Hotspurs
- St. Andrews
- St. George's

== Changes from previous season ==
- Marsaxlokk and Vittoriosa Stars were promoted to the Premier League. They were replaced with Dingli Swallows and Msida Saint-Joseph, both relegated from 2009–10 Maltese Premier League
- St. Patrick and last-placed San Gwann were relegated to the 2010–11 Maltese Second Division. They were replaced with Lija Athletic and St. Andrews.

== League table ==
Pos	Team	Pld	W	D	L	GF	GA	GD	Pts	Promotion or relegation
1	Balzan (C)	18	15	2	1	42	16	+26	47	Promotion to the 2011–12 Maltese Premier League
2	Mqabba (P)	18	10	5	3	38	16	+22	35	Promotion to the 2011–12 Maltese Premier League
3	Mosta (P)	18	9	5	4	42	22	+20	32	Promotion to the 2011–12 Maltese Premier League
4	Melita	18	9	5	4	31	21	+10	32	
5	Lija Athletic	18	7	3	8	24	25	−1	24	
6	St. George's	18	6	6	6	25	28	−3	24	
7	St. Andrews	18	5	5	8	20	28	−8	20	
8	Dingli Swallows	18	5	3	10	20	36	−16	18	
9	Pietà Hotspurs	18	4	4	10	34	37	−3	16	
10	Msida Saint-Joseph (R)	18	0	2	16	5	52	−47	−2 (Note: Msida Saint-Joseph were docked four points because of unknown reasons.)	Relegation to the 2011–12 Maltese Second Division

Rules for classification: 1) points; 2) goal difference; 3) number of goals scored.
(C) Champions; (P) Promoted; (R) Relegated

== Results ==
Home \ Away	BAL	DIN	LJA	MEL	MOS	MQA	MSJ	PIE	STA	STG
Balzan Youths	—	2–0	3–1	3–2	2–1	2–1	0–3 (Note: Match awarded (originally finished 2–0).)	4–3	1–1	1–0
Dingli Swallows	1–4	—	1–0	0–1	0–3	1–3	2–0	4–1	0–0	1–1
Lija Athletic	1–2	1–2	—	1–1	0–4	1–0	4–0	3–1	3–0	1–1
Melita	1–0	3–1	3–1	—	3–2	0–2	2–0	2–2	1–1	1–2
Mosta	0–0	4–2	2–0	3–2	—	1–3	4–0	1–1	6–1	0–1
Mqabba	0–2	2–2	3–1	0–0	0–0	—	2–0	3–0	0–0	7–1
Msida Saint-Joseph	0–5	0–2	1–2	0–4	1–4	1–1	—	0–6	0–5	1–3
Pietà Hotspurs	1–2	6–1	0–2	1–2	3–3	2–4	2–0	—	0–1	3–2
St. Andrews	0–3	2–0	1–2	1–1	2–3	1–4	2–1	1–0	—	0–1
St. George's	3–4	3–0	0–0	1–2	1–1	1–3	0–0	2–2	2–1	—

Legend: Blue = home team win; Yellow = draw; Red = away team win.

== Top scorers ==
As of 1 May 2011

Rank	Player	Club	Goals
1	(England) Simon Shead	Mosta	15
2	(Malta) John Paul Muscat	Mqabba	14
3	(Brazil) Pedrinho	Balzan Youths	13
4	(Malta) Zach Muscat	Pietà Hotspurs	11
5	(Malta) Glenn Bonello	St. George's	10
6	(Malta) Quelin Refalo	Pietà Hotspurs	8
6	(England) Mark Briggs	Mosta	8
8	(Brazil) Thiago Mazzitelli	Mqabba	7
8	(Brazil) Jonathan Luis Ruiz	St. George's	7
8	(Bosnia and Herzegovina) Admir Džanović	Lija Athletic	7
