= 2008–09 Maltese Second Division =

Maltese Second Division
- Season: 2008–09
- Champions: Balzan
- Promoted: Balzan; Melita
- Relegated: Naxxar Lions; Mgarr United; Marsa
- Goals: 341
- Average goals/game: 2.58
- Top goalscorer: Matthew Borg I (18)

The 2008–09 Maltese Second Division season, also known as the 2008–09 BOV 2nd Division due to sponsorship reason) started on 27 September 2008 and ended on 10 May 2009. Mellieha and Marsa were relegated from the First Division. The promoted teams were Gozo FC and Zebbug Rangers. Zebbug had to start the season with a five point deduction due to incidents which occurred the previous season. The 2008–09 Maltese Second Division was won by Balzan.The runners-up were Melita, who finished 2 points off Lija Athletic. Mgarr United and Marsa were relegated to the Third Division. This was the third straight relegation for Marsa, who 3 years previously were competing in the Premier League and now have to compete in the Third Division. Naxxar Lions were also relegated as they lost in the promotion-relegation play-offs to Santa Lucia. The play-offs were won by Zurrieq.

== Participating teams ==
Participating teams
- Balzan
- Birżebbuġa
- Gozo
- Lija
- Marsa
- Mellieħa
- Melita
- Mġarr
- Naxxar
- St. Andrews
- Santa Venera
- Żebbuġ

== Changes from previous season ==
- San Gwann and Rabat Ajax were promoted to 2008–09 Maltese First Division. They were replaced with Mellieha and Marsa, both relegated from 2007–08 Maltese First Division
- Zurrieq and Sirens were relegated to 2008–09 Maltese Third Division. They were replaced with Gozo FC and Zebbug Rangers, both promoted from 2007–08 Maltese Third Division.

== Final league table ==
Pos	Team	Pld	W	D	L	GF	GA	GD	Pts	Promotion or relegation
1	Balzan (C)	22	18	3	1	48	9	+39	58 (Note: 1 bonus point awarded?)	Champions and promotion to 2009–10 Maltese First Division
2	Melita	22	15	5	2	49	11	+38	50	Runners-up and promotion to 2009–10 Maltese First Division
3	Lija Athletic	22	15	3	4	35	17	+18	48	
4	Santa Venera Lightning	22	10	4	8	24	24	0	34	
5	Birzebbuga St. Peters	22	9	4	9	27	28	−1	31	
6	Mellieha	22	9	3	10	29	24	+5	30	
7	Gozo FC	22	7	6	9	27	37	−10	27	
8	St. Andrews	22	4	13	5	24	23	+1	25	
9	Zebbug Rangers	22	5	9	8	25	29	−4	19 (Note: Zebbug started the season with a 5 point deduction due to incidents that occurred in the Champions play-off of the 3rd Division)	
10	Naxxar Lions (R)	22	4	5	13	25	49	−24	17	Relegation playoffs
11	Mgarr United (R)	22	3	6	13	18	41	−23	15	Relegation to 2009–10 Maltese Third Division
12	Marsa (R)	22	1	3	18	10	49	−39	6	Relegation to 2009–10 Maltese Third Division

(C) Champions; (R) Relegated

== Relegation-promotion play-off ==
Participating

Club	Position
Gudja United	3rd in 3rd Division Section A
Mdina Knights	2nd in 3rd Division Section A
Naxxar Lions	10th in Maltese Second Division 2007-08
Santa Lucia	3rd in 3rd Division Section B
Zurrieq	2nd in 3rd Division Section B

Quarter final

Team 1	Score	Team 2
Gudja United	0–2	Santa Lucia

- Gudja United remain in Maltese Third Division

Semi-finals

Team 1	Score	Team 2
Mdina Knights	0–1	Zurrieq
Naxxar Lions	0–1	Santa Lucia

- Mdina Knights remain in Maltese Third Division
- Naxxar Lions relegated to Maltese Third Division

Final

Team 1	Score	Team 2
Zurrieq	2–2 (a.e.t.) (5–4 p)	Santa Lucia

- Zurrieq promoted to Maltese Second Division
- Santa Lucia remain in Maltese Third Division

== Results ==
Home \ Away	BAL	BIR	GOZ	LIJ	MAR	MLT	MLL	MGA	NAX	STA	STV	ZEB
Balzan		1–0	7–1	2–0	2–0	0–0	2–1	3–1	5–3	1–0	4–0	1–0
Birzebbuga	0–1		2–2	0–1	1–0	1–4	1–1	3–1	2–1	0–1	0–1	6–3
Gozo	0–1	1–1		2–3	3–0	1–2	1–0	3–1	2–0	0–0	0–0	0–0
Lija	2–0	1–0	5–2		2–1	0–2	2–1	2–0	2–0	1–1	2–1	0–2
Marsa	0–3	0–1	3–4	0–4		0–4	0–3	0–3	2–3	0–0	2–5	0–3
Melita	0–0	4–0	3–0	0–1	3–0		4–1	0–0	6–1	1–0	3–0	2–1
Mellieha	0–1	0–1	3–0	0–3	1–0	2–1		3–0	3–1	1–2	0–0	1–1
Mgarr	0–5	2–3	0–3	0–1	1–0	0–1	0–3		0–3	1–1	2–3	2–0
Naxxar	1–4	2–0	3–1	2–2	0–0	1–6	0–2	0–0		3–3	0–2	0–1
St. Andrews	0–0	1–1	3–0	1–0	1–1	1–1	1–2	2–2	1–1		1–2	1–1
St. Venera	0–3	0–3	0–1	0–1	2–0	0–1	1–0	0–0	3–0	1–0		1–1
Zebbug	0–2	0–1	1–1	0–0	0–1	1–1	2–1	2–2	2–0	3–3	0–2	

Legend: Blue = home team win; Yellow = draw; Red = away team win.

== Top scorers ==
Goals	Player	Team
18	(Malta) Matthew Borg I	Melita
13	(Malta) Aaron Agius	Balzan
12	(Malta) Ronnie Celeste	Birzebbuga
11	(Malta) Wayne Borg St. John	Mellieha
