= 2009–10 Maltese First Division =

Maltese First Division
- Season: 2009–10
- Champions: Marsaxlokk
- Promoted: Marsaxlokk; Vittoriosa Stars
- Relegated: St. Patrick; San Ġwann
- Goals scored: 276
- Average goals/game: 3.06
- Top goalscorer: Simon Shead

The 2009–10 Maltese First Division season started in October 2009 and ended in May 2010. Vittoriosa Stars (2008–09 Maltese First Division Runners up) and Marsaxlokk (2008–09 Maltese Premier League 4th place) were both found guilty of corruption and demoted into the First Division. Balzan Youths and Melita were promoted from 2008–09 Maltese Second Division.

== Teams ==
These teams will contest the 2009–10 season:

- Balzan Youths
- Marsaxlokk
- Melita
- Mosta
- Mqabba
- Pietà Hotspurs
- San Ġwann
- St. George's
- St. Patrick
- Vittoriosa Stars

== Changes from previous season ==
- Dingli Swallows and Vittoriosa Stars were promoted to the Premier League and were initially replaced with Ħamrun Spartans and Msida Saint-Joseph, both relegated from 2008–09 Maltese Premier League.

However, Vittoriosa Stars and Marsaxlokk (who finished 4th place on the Premier Division) were both found guilty of corruption and demoted from the Premier Division into the First Division. Msida Saint-Joseph and Hamrun Spartans were therefore reinstated in the Maltese Premier League.

- Rabat Ajax and Senglea Athletic were relegated to the 2009–10 Maltese Second Division. They were replaced with Balzan and Melita.

== League table ==
Pos	Team	Pld	W	D	L	GF	GA	GD	Pts	Promotion or relegation
1	Marsaxlokk (C)	18	12	5	1	42	14	+28	41	Promotion to 2010–11 Maltese Premier League
2	Vittoriosa Stars (P)	18	11	3	4	28	13	+15	36	Promotion to 2010–11 Maltese Premier League
3	Balzan Youths	18	9	4	5	26	18	+8	31	
4	St. George's	18	9	2	7	28	32	−4	29	
5	Mosta	18	7	6	5	31	28	+3	27	
6	Mqabba	18	5	6	7	30	30	0	21	
7	Melita	18	5	4	9	21	31	−10	19	
8	Pieta Hotspurs	18	4	5	9	15	25	−10	17	
9	St. Patrick (R)	18	5	2	11	14	34	−20	17	Relegation to 2010–11 Maltese Second Division
10	San Ġwann (R)	18	2	5	11	21	30	−9	11	Relegation to 2010–11 Maltese Second Division

(C) Champions; (P) Promoted; (R) Relegated

== Results ==
Home \ Away	BAL	MAR	MEL	MOS	MQA	PIE	SĠW	STG	STP	VIT
Balzan Youths	—	0–2	2–1	2–2	3–2	3–1	3–2	3–0	2–0	0–2
Marsaxlokk	1–1	—	2–0	3–0	1–1	3–1	4–4	1–2	2–1	2–0
Melita	3–0	1–4	—	1–2	1–0	1–0	0–0	0–3	0–2	2–4
Mosta	0–3	2–2	2–2	—	2–2	1–2	2–1	1–1	1–2	1–2
Mqabba	1–0	1–1	4–4	2–5	—	1–3	1–1	2–1	4–0	0–1
Pietà Hotspurs	0–0	0–3	1–1	1–3	0–4	—	0–2	0–1	0–1	1–1
San Ġwann	0–0	0–3	2–3	0–1	2–2	0–3	—	1–2	0–1	0–1
St. George's	0–2	0–5	1–0	1–4	2–1	0–2	3–0	—	6–1	2–1
St. Patrick	0–2	0–1	2–0	0–1	0–1	0–0	1–6	3–3	—	0–1
Vittoriosa Stars	1–0	0–2	0–1	1–1	3–1	0–0	1–0	5–0	4–0	—

Legend: Blue = home team win; Yellow = draw; Red = away team win.

== Top scorers ==
As of 3 May 2010

Rank	Player	Club	Goals
1	(England) Simon Shead	Balzan Youths	13
2	(Malta) Malcolm Licari	Marsaxlokk	10
3	(Romania) Leontin Chitescu	Vittoriosa Stars	9
4	(Malta) John Paul Muscat	Mqabba	8
5	(Malta) Glenn Bonello	St. George's	7
