= 2009–10 Maltese Second Division =

Maltese Second Division season

Maltese Second Division
- Season: 2009–10
- Champions: Lija Athletic
- Promoted: Lija Athletic; St. Andrews
- Relegated: Santa Venera Lightning; Gharghur; Gozo FC
- Goals: 396
- Average goals/game: 3
- Top goalscorer: Wayne Borg St.John (17)

The 2009–10 Maltese Second Division started in September 2009 and will end in May 2010. Rabat Ajax and Senglea Athletic were relegated from the 2008–09 Maltese First Division. Gzira United, Gharghur and Zurrieq were promoted from the 2008–09 Maltese Third Division. The Maltese Second Division 2009–10 was won by Lija Athletic. The runners-up were St. Andrews. Gharghur and Gozo FC were relegated. Santa Venra Lightning were also relegated after losing in the relegation playoffs.

== Participating teams ==
- Birzebbuga St.Peters
- Gharghur
- Gozo FC
- Gzira United
- Lija Athletic
- Mellieha
- Rabat Ajax
- Senglea Athletic
- St.Andrews
- Santa Venera Lightning
- Zebbug Rangers
- Zurrieq

== Changes from previous season ==
- Balzan Youths and Melita were promoted to 2009–10 Maltese First Division. They were replaced with Rabat Ajax and Senglea Athletic, both relegated from 2008–09 Maltese First Division.
- Naxxar Lions, Mgarr United and Marsa were relegated to 2009–10 Maltese Third Division. They were replaced with Gzira United, Gharghur and Zurrieq, all promoted from the 2008–09 Maltese Third Division.

== Final league table ==
Pos	Team	Pld	W	D	L	GF	GA	GD	Pts	Promotion or relegation
1	Lija Athletic (C)	22	14	6	2	48	22	+26	48	Champions and promotion to 2010–11 Maltese First Division
2	St.Andrews (P)	22	13	7	2	44	20	+24	46	Runners-up and promotion to 2010–11 Maltese First Division
3	Gzira United	22	12	5	5	35	28	+7	41	
4	Birzebbuga St.Peters	22	12	3	7	42	28	+14	39	
5	Mellieha	22	9	6	7	42	29	+13	33	
6	Rabat Ajax	22	8	6	8	40	33	+7	30	
7	Zebbug Rangers	22	7	6	9	36	35	+1	27	
8	Zurrieq	22	6	8	8	18	25	−7	26	
9	Senglea Athletic	22	6	7	9	17	26	−9	25	
10	St. Venera Lightning(RP)	22	5	6	11	26	42	−16	21	Relegation playoffs
11	Gharghur (R)	22	3	6	13	24	49	−25	15	Relegation to 2010–11 Maltese Third Division
12	Gozo FC (R)	22	2	4	16	24	59	−35	10	Relegation to 2010–11 Maltese Third Division

(C) Champions; (P) Promoted; (R) Relegated

== Results ==
Home \ Away	BIR	GHA	GOZ	GZI	LIJ	MEL	RAB	SEN	STA	STV	ZEB	ZUR
Birzebbuga		3–0	5–1	1–2	1–0	2–2	0–5	1–3	2–2	0–2	3–2	1–0
Gharghur	1–4		0–2	0–0	1–4	0–0	0–3	1–2	0–3	1–1	2–2	0–0
Gozo	1–2	1–1		0–3	3–4	1–4	1–2	0–0	2–2	1–1	1–3	3–0
Gzira	3–2	3–2	5–4		0–2	0–4	3–1	2–0	1–0	1–1	3–3	1–2
Lija	0–0	6–1	2–0	2–1		6–2	4–3	1–0	2–2	2–2	1–0	2–0
Mellieha	1–0	1–2	5–0	1–2	0–0		2–2	3–0	0–2	1–1	3–1	4–1
Rabat	0–3	4–2	4–0	1–1	0–2	0–3		0–0	1–2	7–0	2–2	1–0
Senglea	1–3	0–3	2–0	0–1	0–0	3–2	1–2		1–1	1–0	0–1	0–3
St. Andrews	0–3	4–1	2–1	2–0	2–1	3–1	2–0	0–0		3–0	2–0	0–0
St. Venera	2–1	1–3	3–1	0–1	1–2	0–2	2–2	1–2	2–6		0–1	3–1
Zebbug	0–3	3–2	7–1	0–2	1–3	3–1	3–0	1–1	1–1	1–2		1–1
Zurrieq	0–2	2–1	2–0	0–0	2–2	0–0	0–0	0–0	1–3	2–1	1–0	

Legend: Blue = home team win; Yellow = draw; Red = away team win.
