= 2013–14 Maltese First Division =

Maltese First Division
- Season: 2013–14

The 2013–14 Maltese First Division (also known as 2013–14 BOV 1st Division due to sponsorship reasons) began on 13 September 2013 and ended on 27 April 2014.

== Participating teams ==
These teams will contest the 2013–14 Maltese First Division season:

- Birżebbuġa St. Peter's
- Gudja United
- Gżira United
- Ħamrun Spartans
- Lija Athletic
- Melita
- Msida Saint-Joseph
- Pietà Hotspurs
- St. Andrews
- St. George's
- Żebbuġ Rangers
- Żejtun Corinthians
- Żurrieq

== Changes from previous season ==
- Naxxar Lions and Vittoriosa Stars were promoted to the 2013–14 Maltese Premier League. They were replaced with Melita and Ħamrun Spartans, relegated from 2012–13 Maltese Premier League.
- Dingli Swallows and Mqabba were relegated to the 2013–14 Maltese Second Division. They were replaced with Żebbuġ Rangers, Msida Saint-Joseph, St. George's and Żurrieq all promoted from 2012–13 Maltese Second Division.
- Marsaxlokk were relegated to the 2013–14 Maltese Third Division since finding financial difficulties.

== Final league table ==
Pos	Team	Pld	W	D	L	GF	GA	GD	Pts	Promotion or relegation
1	Pietà Hotspurs (C)	24	18	4	2	68	22	+46	58	Promotion to 2014–15 Maltese Premier League
2	Żebbuġ Rangers (P)	24	14	3	7	51	38	+13	45	Promotion to 2014–15 Maltese Premier League
3	St. Andrews	24	12	4	8	55	45	+10	40	
4	Gżira United	24	10	5	9	38	31	+7	35	
5	Gudja United	24	10	4	10	41	45	−4	34	
6	Melita	24	9	6	9	36	35	+1	33	
7	Lija Athletic	24	9	6	9	44	44	0	33	
8	St. George's	24	8	7	9	33	40	−7	31	
9	Żurrieq	24	9	3	12	40	40	0	30	
10	Birżebbuġa St. Peter's	24	8	5	11	40	47	−7	29	
11	Msida Saint-Joseph	24	8	3	13	35	43	−8	27	
12	Ħamrun Spartans (R)	24	7	6	11	31	42	−11	19 (Note: Hamrun Spartans started on a -8 points deduction.)	Relegation to 2014–15 Maltese Second Division
13	Żejtun Corinthians (R)	24	5	2	17	26	66	−40	17	Relegation to 2014–15 Maltese Second Division

(C) Champions; (P) Promoted; (R) Relegated

== Results ==
Home \ Away	BBĠ	GDJ	GŻI	ĦAM	LJA	MEL	MSJ	PIE	STA	STG	ŻEB	ŻEJ	ŻRQ
Birżebbuġa St. Peter's	—	2–1	3–1	4–0	0–2	2–2	1–0	2–6	4–1	1–1	4–1	2–6	3–5
Gudja United	2–1	—	0–0	1–0	4–4	1–1	2–4	2–7	1–4	1–2	3–0	2–0	1–2
Gżira United	2–1	2–1	—	0–0	3–0	2–1	0–2	0–0	1–0	3–3	2–0	5–0	1–0
Ħamrun Spartans	1–1	4–4	1–4	—	3–2	0–2	2–0	1–3	3–1	1–2	2–1	2–2	1–2
Lija Athletic	3–0	2–0	2–1	0–1	—	0–1	3–1	2–2	2–5	2–0	2–3	3–2	1–5
Melita	1–1	1–4	3–2	0–0	2–1	—	2–1	1–2	1–2	3–3	1–2	1–2	4–1
Msida Saint-Joseph	3–1	0–3	0–0	4–0	2–2	2–1	—	1–3	2–2	2–0	0–2	4–2	1–2
Pietà Hotspurs	2–0	1–2	3–2	3–1	1–1	2–1	4–0	—	4–3	1–1	4–0	7–0	1–0
St. Andrews	1–2	0–1	3–2	2–1	3–2	0–0	2–0	1–4	—	1–1	2–1	8–2	5–3
St. George's	2–0	2–3	3–2	0–2	2–2	0–2	2–1	0–2	1–3	—	1–3	1–0	2–1
Żebbuġ Rangers	3–2	3–1	1–0	2–1	3–3	4–0	2–3	1–0	4–1	2–2	—	4–1	2–2
Żejtun Corinthians	0–2	0–1	1–2	1–1	0–2	1–4	2–1	0–4	1–3	1–0	0–5	—	2–1
Żurrieq	1–1	3–0	3–1	1–3	0–1	0–1	3–1	0–2	2–2	1–2	1–2	1–0	—

Legend: Blue = home team win; Yellow = draw; Red = away team win.

== Top scorers ==
As of 27 April 2014

Rank	Player	Club	Goals
1	(Cameroon) Raphael Kooh Sohna	Pietà Hotspurs	28
2	(Bulgaria) Trayo Grozev	St. Andrews	27
3	(Brazil) Mauricio Osmar Britto	Żebbuġ Rangers	17
4	(Bulgaria) Kiril Aleksandrov	Lija Athletic	15
4	(Nigeria) Osi Lucky Agboebina	Żurrieq	15
