= 2012–13 Maltese First Division =

Maltese First Division
- Season: 2012–13

The 2012–13 Maltese First Division (also known as 2012–13 BOV 1st Division due to sponsorship reasons) began on 14 September 2012 and ended on 28 April 2013.

== Participating teams ==
These teams contested the 2012–13 Maltese First Division season:

- Birżebbuġa St. Peter's
- Dingli Swallows
- Gudja United
- Gżira United
- Lija Athletic
- Marsaxlokk
- Mqabba
- Naxxar Lions
- Pietà Hotspurs
- St. Andrews
- Vittoriosa Stars
- Żejtun Corinthians

== Changes from previous season ==
- Melita and Rabat Ajax were promoted to the 2012–13 Maltese Premier League. They were replaced with Marsaxlokk and Mqabba, relegated from 2011–12 Maltese Premier League.
- St. Patrick and St. George's were relegated to the 2012–13 Maltese Second Division. They were replaced with Gżira United and Gudja United, all promoted from 2011–12 Maltese Second Division.

== Final league table ==
Pos	Team	Pld	W	D	L	GF	GA	GD	Pts	Promotion or relegation
1	Naxxar Lions (C)	22	13	5	4	47	22	+25	44 (Note: Winner was decided by the championship playoff)	Promotion to 2013–14 Maltese Premier League
2	Vittoriosa Stars (P)	22	13	5	4	41	28	+13	44	Promotion to 2013–14 Maltese Premier League
3	Pietà Hotspurs	22	13	4	5	46	22	+24	43	
4	Lija Athletic	22	13	3	6	42	30	+12	42	
5	St. Andrews	22	11	5	6	43	32	+11	38	
6	Marsaxlokk	22	9	5	8	38	44	−6	32	
7	Gudja United	22	8	6	8	35	36	−1	30	
8	Gżira United	22	5	9	8	26	29	−3	24	
9	Birżebbuġa St. Peter's	22	6	5	11	38	43	−5	23	
10	Żejtun Corinthians	22	5	6	11	21	35	−14	21	
11	Dingli Swallows (R)	22	4	4	14	21	50	−29	16	Relegation to 2013–14 Maltese Second Division
12	Mqabba (R)	22	1	5	16	24	51	−27	8	Relegation to 2013–14 Maltese Second Division

(C) Champions; (P) Promoted; (R) Relegated

== Results ==
Home \ Away	BBĠ	DIN	GDJ	GŻI	LJA	MAR	MQA	NAX	PIE	STA	VIT	ŻEJ
Birżebbuġa St. Peter's	—	3–1	0–4	1–1	1–3	0–2	4–3	2–3	2–1	1–2	1–1	0–1
Dingli Swallows	3–2	—	0–1	1–1	0–2	1–3	1–0	1–2	0–2	2–1	1–2	4–3
Gudja United	0–6	3–2	—	1–0	1–2	1–3	3–0	1–4	2–1	1–1	1–2	1–1
Gżira United	1–1	1–1	0–0	—	1–2	4–0	1–0	0–2	1–4	1–2	3–0	0–0
Lija Athletic	3–2	2–0	1–0	1–1	—	1–4	1–1	0–1	1–1	3–8	1–2	3–0
Marsaxlokk	0–0	4–1	3–2	3–2	1–5	—	0–4	1–3	0–2	1–1	2–2	2–0
Mqabba	1–5	1–1	1–4	1–2	1–2	1–5	—	1–1	2–3	3–4	1–1	1–2
Naxxar Lions	1–3	6–0	2–2	2–2	2–0	2–0	5–1	—	0–2	4–0	0–2	5–1
Pietà Hotspurs	4–0	6–1	1–0	2–0	0–2	2–2	4–0	0–0	—	1–2	4–1	2–2
St. Andrews	3–1	2–0	2–2	3–1	0–3	4–1	1–1	2–2	0–1	—	1–2	0–1
Vittoriosa Stars	3–1	0–0	2–3	1–1	3–2	6–1	2–1	2–1	3–1	0–2	—	1–0
Żejtun Corinthians	2–2	3–0	2–2	1–2	0–2	0–0	1–0	0–1	1–2	0–2	0–3	—

Legend: Blue = home team win; Yellow = draw; Red = away team win.

== Championship playoff ==
4 May 2013	Naxxar Lions	2–1	Vittoriosa Stars	Victor Tedesco Stadium, Hamrun
17:00	Falzon 77'; Ewurum 90+4'	Report	Micallef 58'	Referee: Fyodor Zammit

== Top scorers ==
As of 28 April 2013

Rank	Player	Club	Goals
1	(Cameroon) Raphael Kooh Sohna	Pietà Hotspurs	19
2	(Bulgaria) Trayo Grozev	St. Andrews	16
2	(Brazil) Marcelo Pereira	Vittoriosa Stars	16
4	(Brazil) Vinicius Pereira dos Santos	Birżebbuġa St. Peter's	13
5	(Albania) Erjon Beu	Lija Athletic	12
6	(Nigeria) Senior David	Pietà Hotspurs / Dingli Swallows	11
6	(Sweden) Andre Grabowski	Marsaxlokk	11
6	(Brazil) Douglas da Silva Silveira	Marsaxlokk	11
9	(Bulgaria) Rumen Kerekov	St. Andrews	10
9	(Bulgaria) Kiril Alexandrov	Gudja United	10
