= Maurício Britto =

Brazilian footballer

Personal information
- Full name: Maurício Osmar Rodrigues Britto
- Date of birth: 22 June 1991 (age 35)
- Place of birth: Porto Alegre, Brazil
- Height: 1.80 m (5 ft 11 in)
- Position: Forward

Team information
- Current team: Al Hidd

Youth career
- –2010: Avaí

Senior career*
Years	Team	Apps	(Gls)
2011	Avaí	0	(0)
2012	Bangu	0	(0)
2012–2015	Żebbuġ Rangers	81	(52)
2015–2016	Al-Yarmouk		
2016	Al-Najma		
2016–2017	Żebbuġ Rangers	17	(6)
2018	Hercílio Luz	0	(0)
2018–2019	Budaiya		(6)
2019–	Al Hidd		
- * Club domestic league appearances and goals as of 19:55, 10 July 2019 (UTC)

Maurício Osmar Rodrigues Britto (born 22 June 1991) is a Brazilian footballer who plays as a forward.

== Career ==
On 28 August 2019 Al Hidd SC from Bahrain confirmed the signing of Maurício on their Instagram page.

== Career statistics ==
=== Club ===
As of 10 July 2019.

Club	Season	League			State League		Cup		Other		Total	
Club	Season	Division	Apps	Goals	Apps	Goals	Apps	Goals	Apps	Goals	Apps	Goals
Avaí	2012	Série B	0	0	1 (Note: Appearances in the Campeonato Catarinense)	1	0	0	0	0	1	1
Bangu	2012	–			4 (Note: Appearances in the Campeonato Carioca)	0	0	0	0	0	4	0
Żebbuġ Rangers	2012–13	Maltese First Division	–		–		2 (Note: Appearances in the Maltese FA Trophy)	0	0	0	2	0
Żebbuġ Rangers	2014–15	Maltese First Division	33	11	–		0	0	0	0	33	11
Żebbuġ Rangers	Total		33	11	0	0	2	0	0	0	35	11
Hercílio Luz	2018	–			4	0	0	0	0	0	4	0
Career total			33	11	9	1	2	0	0	0	44	12
