= 2010–11 Maltese Third Division =

Maltese Third Division
- Season: 2010–11
- Matches: 176
- Goals: 549 (3.12 per match)
- Top goalscorer: 19 goals Jason Camilleri - Siggiewi F.C.
- Highest scoring: Siggiewi F.C. 7–3 Marsaskala F.C. (9 January 2011)

The Maltese Third Division 2010–11 (known as BOV 3rd Division 2010-11 due to sponsorship reasons) was the 11th season of the Maltese Third Division. The season began on 26 September 2010 and concluded on 15 May 2011 with the promotion play-offs final. Gozo, Gharghur and Santa Venera were relegated from the Maltese Second Division 2009-10.

This is the debut season of Marsaskala.

== League Changes ==
The Maltese Third Division is divided into two sections; Section A consisting of 11 teams and Section B with 10 teams. The winners of each section will win promotion and face each other in a championship play-off to decide the Maltese Third Division champions.

For the 2010–11 season, teams placing 2nd and 3rd in both sections will be promoted to the Maltese Second Division due to the change in the Maltese league format. A promotion decider will be played between the teams ending 4th in Sections A and B respectively.

== Teams ==
A total of twenty-one teams divided into two sections will contest the league, including seventeen sides from the 2009–10 season, three relegated teams from the 2009–10 the Maltese Second Division and Marsaskala F.C., a new founded club.

2009–10 Maltese Third Division champions Zejtun Corinthians F.C. and Section A winners Mgarr United F.C. secured direct promotion to the Second Division. Naxxar Lions had to beat Gudja Utd on penalties in the promotion play-off final to join them in the Second Division. Mgarr Utd and Naxxar made their immediate return to the Second Division after being relegated at the end of the 2008–09 season.

=== Section A ===
- Attard F.C.
- Gudja United F.C.
- Marsaskala F.C.
- Mdina Knights F.C.
- Mtarfa F.C.
- Qrendi F.C.
- Siggiewi F.C.
- St. Lucia F.C.
- St. Venera Lightning F.C.
- Swieqi United F.C.
- Xghajra Tornadoes F.C.

=== Section B ===
- Fgura United F.C.
- Gharghur F.C.
- Ghaxaq F.C.
- Gozo F.C.
- Kalkara F.C.
- Kirkop United F.C.
- Luqa St. Andrew's F.C.
- Marsa F.C.
- Pembroke Athleta F.C.
- Sirens F.C.

== League table ==
=== Section A ===
| Pos | Team | Pld | W | D | L | GF | GA | GD | Pts |
|---|---|---|---|---|---|---|---|---|---|
| 1 | St. Venera Lightning F.C. (P) | 19 | 15 | 1 | 3 | 35 | 12 | +23 | 46 |
| 2 | Siggiewi F.C. (Q) | 18 | 14 | 1 | 3 | 41 | 20 | +21 | 43 |
| 3 | Gudja United F.C. (Q) | 18 | 13 | 3 | 2 | 45 | 11 | +34 | 42 |
| 4 | Attard F.C. | 18 | 10 | 3 | 5 | 35 | 18 | +17 | 33 |
| 5 | Mdina Knights F.C. | 18 | 9 | 2 | 7 | 28 | 19 | +9 | 29 |
| 6 | Swieqi United F.C. | 19 | 7 | 4 | 8 | 29 | 31 | −2 | 25 |
| 7 | St. Lucia F.C. | 19 | 7 | 2 | 10 | 16 | 30 | −14 | 23 |
| 8 | Mtarfa F.C. | 18 | 3 | 5 | 10 | 14 | 25 | −11 | 14 |
| 9 | Xghajra Tornadoes F.C. | 19 | 4 | 2 | 13 | 16 | 45 | −29 | 14 |
| 10 | Marsaskala F.C. | 18 | 3 | 3 | 12 | 22 | 46 | −24 | 12 |
| 11 | Qrendi F.C. | 18 | 1 | 4 | 13 | 10 | 34 | −24 | 7 |

(P) Promoted; (Q) Qualified for Playoff

=== Section B ===
| Pos | Team | Pld | W | D | L | GF | GA | GD | Pts |
|---|---|---|---|---|---|---|---|---|---|
| 1 | Gharghur F.C. (C) | 18 | 13 | 2 | 3 | 42 | 23 | +19 | 41 |
| 3 | Kirkop United F.C. (P) | 18 | 12 | 2 | 4 | 39 | 17 | +22 | 38 |
| 2 | Luqa St. Andrew's F.C. (P) | 18 | 11 | 4 | 3 | 43 | 22 | +21 | 37 |
| 5 | Pembroke Athleta F.C. (Q) | 18 | 9 | 2 | 7 | 32 | 28 | +4 | 29 |
| 4 | Fgura United F.C. | 18 | 7 | 3 | 8 | 31 | 35 | −4 | 24 |
| 6 | Sirens F.C. | 18 | 6 | 5 | 7 | 36 | 36 | 0 | 23 |
| 7 | Ghaxaq F.C. | 18 | 5 | 4 | 9 | 28 | 34 | −6 | 19 |
| 8 | Marsa F.C. | 17 | 4 | 5 | 8 | 19 | 26 | −7 | 17 |
| 9 | Gozo F.C. | 17 | 5 | 1 | 11 | 26 | 48 | −22 | 16 |
| 10 | Kalkara F.C. | 18 | 2 | 2 | 14 | 17 | 44 | −27 | 8 |

(C) Champions; (P) Promoted; (Q) Qualified for Playoff
