= 2009–10 Maltese Third Division =

Maltese Third Division
- Season: 2009–10

The Maltese Third Division 2009–10 (known as BOV 3rd Division 2009–10 due to sponsorship reasons) was the 10th season of the Maltese Third Division. It started in September 2009 and ended in May 2010 with the promotion play-offs. Naxxar Lions, Mgarr United and Marsa were relegated from the 2008–09 Maltese Second Division.

The division is divided into two sections (Section A and Section B), both with 10 teams. The winners of each section faced each other in a play-off where the winner was crowned as champion of the division, but both teams were still given the promotion.

Mgarr United won Section A, while Zejtun Corinthians won Section B after a decider with Naxxar Lions. In the Championship play-off Zejtun bet Mgarr 4–3 to win the Division.

In the promotion play-offs semi-final Gudja United beat Santa Venera, who finished 10th in the Second Division. In the final Naxxar Lions defeated Gudja on penalties to win promotion.

This was the debut season of Swieqi United.

== Clubs ==
=== Section A ===
- Fgura United
- Ghaxaq
- Kalkara
- Luqa SA
- Marsa
- Mdina Knights
- Mgarr United
- Mtarfa
- Pembroke A.
- Siggiewi

=== Section B ===
- Attard
- Gudja United
- Kirkop United
- Naxxar Lions
- Qrendi
- Santa Lucia
- Sirens
- Swieqi United
- Xghajra T.
- Zejtun C.

== Changes from previous season ==
- Gzira United, Gharghur and Zurrieq were promoted to 2009–10 Maltese Second Division. They were replaced with Naxxar Lions, Mgarr United and Marsa, all relegated from the 2008–09 Maltese Second Division

== League table ==
=== Section A ===
Pos	Team	Pld	W	D	L	GF	GA	GD	Pts	Promotion or qualification
1	Mgarr United (C)	18	14	2	2	41	17	+24	44	Promoted to 2010–11 Maltese Second Division
2	Mdina Knights (Q)	18	11	4	3	33	19	+14	37	Qualified for promotion-relegation play-off
3	Ghaxaq (Q)	18	9	4	5	36	32	+4	31	Qualified for promotion-relegation play-off
4	Marsa	18	7	5	6	22	19	+3	26	
5	Siggiewi	18	8	2	8	33	37	−4	26	
6	Mtarfa	18	6	5	7	19	25	−6	23	
7	Luqa St. Andrew's	18	6	3	9	34	33	+1	21	
8	Pembroke Athleta	18	5	3	10	22	28	−6	18	
9	Fgura United	18	4	2	12	17	31	−14	14	
10	Kalkara	18	4	2	12	21	37	−16	14	

(C) Champions; (Q) Qualified for the phase indicated

=== Section B ===
Pos	Team	Pld	W	D	L	GF	GA	GD	Pts	Promotion or qualification
1	Zejtun Corinthians (C)	18	14	4	0	46	8	+38	46 (Note: Since Zejtun Corinthians and Naxxar Lions were level on points, the section championship was decided by a play-off match (won by Zejtun Corinthians).)	Promoted to 2010–11 Maltese Second Division
2	Naxxar Lions (Q)	18	15	1	2	51	16	+35	46	Qualified for promotion-relegation play-off
3	Gudja United (Q)	18	9	3	6	37	17	+20	30	Qualified for promotion-relegation play-off
4	Attard	18	7	6	5	30	27	+3	27	
5	Kirkop United	18	6	5	7	25	27	−2	23	
6	Sirens	18	7	1	10	31	42	−11	22	
7	Xghajra Tornadoes	18	6	1	11	19	37	−18	19	
8	Swieqi United	18	5	1	12	25	49	−24	16	
9	Qrendi	18	5	0	13	29	51	−22	15	
10	Santa Lucia	18	4	2	12	16	35	−19	14	

(C) Champions; (Q) Qualified for the phase indicated
Notes:

Championship decider
Team 1	Score	Team 2
Naxxar Lions	1–1 (a.e.t.) (3–4 p)	Zejtun Corinthians

== Champions playoff ==
Team 1	Score	Team 2
Mgarr United	3–4	Zejtun Corinthians

== Promotion-relegation play-off ==
Participating

Club	Position
Ghaxaq	3rd in 3rd Division Section A
Gudja United	3rd in 3rd Division Section B
Mdina Knights	2nd in 3rd Division Section A
Naxxar Lions	2nd in 3rd Division Section B
St. Venera Lightning	10th in 2nd Division

Quarter final

Team 1	Score	Team 2
Ghaxaq	1–2	Gudja United

- Ghaxaq remain in Maltese Third Division

Semi-finals

Team 1	Score	Team 2
Mdina Knights	0–2	Naxxar Lions
St. Venera Lightning	0–2	Gudja United

- Mdina Knights remain in Maltese Third Division
- St. Venera Lightning relegated to Maltese Third Division

Final

Team 1	Score	Team 2
Naxxar Lions	5–5 (a.e.t.) (5–4 p)	Gudja United

== Results ==
=== Section A ===
Home \ Away	FGR	GXQ	KKR	LQA	MRS	MDN	MGR	MTF	PBK	SGW
Fgura		2–3	4–1	0–1	1–2	0–3	1–2	2–1	0–2	2–0
Ghaxaq	3–1		1–0	1–1	3–2	2–2	1–2	4–2	2–1	1–2
Kalkara	1–0	2–2		0–2	1–2	1–2	1–3	2–1	0–2	0–3
Luqa	4–0	4–4	3–4		1–1	3–2	1–2	3–4	1–2	3–1
Marsa	1–0	1–0	2–2	2–1		0–0	2–3	0–1	2–1	0–1
Mdina	3–1	2–0	2–1	4–1	0–0		2–0	1–0	3–2	4–3
Mgarr	2–0	1–2	1–0	2–0	3–1	1–0		2–2	1–0	3–0
Mtarfa	0–0	0–2	2–1	0–3	1–0	0–0	1–1		1–0	1–3
Pembroke	1–1	2–3	4–2	1–0	0–0	1–2	1–5	0–1		2–2
Siggiewi	1–2	5–2	1–2	3–2	0–4	3–1	2–7	1–1	2–0	

Legend: Blue = home team win; Yellow = draw; Red = away team win.

=== Section B ===
Home \ Away	ATD	GDJ	KKP	NXR	QRD	SIR	SLC	SWQ	XJR	ZTN
Attard		0–2	2–2	1–6	2–3	3–0	1–2	3–0	4–2	0–0
Gudja	1–1		2–0	1–2	2–3	1–2	0–0	7–0	4–0	0–0
Kirkop	1–1	3–2		0–1	2–0	0–1	3–1	2–2	3–0	1–2
Naxxar	3–1	0–2	5–1		2–0	4–1	1–0	3–0	2–0	3–3
Qrendi	1–2	0–5	0–2	1–5		2–4	1–2	3–4	1–4	1–2
Sirens	3–3	1–3	3–1	0–5	4–5		1–3	3–1	2–1	1–4
St. Lucia	0–1	0–2	0–0	2–4	3–4	1–0		0–4	0–1	1–3
Swieqi	1–4	3–1	2–3	0–1	1–2	0–4	3–1		1–2	0–3
Xghajra	0–1	0–2	0–0	1–4	3–2	2–1	1–0	2–3		0–5
Zejtun	0–0	2–0	3–1	2–0	2–0	3–0	5–0	5–0	2–0	

Legend: Blue = home team win; Yellow = draw; Red = away team win.
