= 2008–09 Maltese First Division =

Maltese First Division
- Season: 2008–09
- Champions: Dingli Swallows
- Promoted: Dingli Swallows
- Relegated: Rabat Ajax; Senglea Athletic
- Goals scored: 276
- Average goals/game: 3.06
- Top goalscorer: Simon Shead and Anthony Eviparker (15)

The 2008–09 Maltese First Division season (known as 2008–09 BOV First Division for sponsorship reasons) started in October 2008 and ended in May 2009. Pieta Hotspurs and Mqabba were relegated from the Premier League. The promoted teams were San Gwann and Rabat Ajax. Dingli Swallows and Vittoriosa Stars finished the league as joint first with the same number of points. Both were promoted but a decider had to be played to decide who the champions would be. The decider was won by Dingli by the score of 2–1. At the other end Rabat Ajax and Senglea Athletic were relegated to the Second Division.

== Teams ==
These teams will contest the Maltese First Division 2008-09 season:

- Dingli Swallows
- Mosta
- Mqabba
- Pietà Hotspurs
- Rabat Ajax
- San Ġwann
- St. George's
- Senglea Athletic
- St. Patrick
- Vittoriosa

== Changes from previous season ==
- Tarxien Rainbows and Qormi were promoted to the Premier League. They were replaced with Pieta Hotspurs and Mqabba, both relegated from 2007–08 Maltese Premier League
- Mellieha and Marsa were relegated to the 2008–09 Maltese Second Division. They were replaced with San Gwann and Rabat Ajax.

== League table ==
Pos	Team	Pld	W	D	L	GF	GA	GD	Pts	Promotion or relegation
1	Dingli Swallows (C)	18	10	4	4	33	17	+16	34	Promoted to 2009–10 Maltese Premier League
2	Vittoriosa Stars (Note: Vittoriosa Stars were promoted. However, after playing one match in the Premier League, Vittoriosa Stars were relegated to the First Division due to a decision by the Board to Investigate Corrupt Practices.)	18	10	4	4	34	20	+14	34	
3	Pietà Hotspurs	18	9	6	3	34	23	+11	33	
4	St. George's	18	8	3	7	34	32	+2	27	
5	St. Patrick	18	7	6	5	24	24	0	27	
6	Mqabba	18	5	9	4	28	24	+4	24	
7	Mosta	18	6	4	8	20	22	−2	22	
8	San Ġwann	18	6	4	8	31	38	−7	22	
9	Rabat Ajax (R)	18	5	2	11	20	36	−16	17	Relegation to 2009–10 Maltese Second Division
10	Senglea Athletic (R)	18	2	2	14	18	40	−22	8	Relegation to 2009–10 Maltese Second Division

(C) Champions; (R) Relegated

== Championship play-offs ==
Team 1	Score	Team 2
Dingli Swallows	2–1	Vittoriosa Stars

== Results ==
Home \ Away	DIN	MOS	MQA	PIE	RAB	SĠW	SEN	STG	STP	VIT
Dingli Swallows	—	1–0	1–0	1–1	4–1	2–2	3–1	3–1	0–1	2–0
Mosta	0–1	—	3–1	1–3	1–0	2–1	1–0	0–1	0–1	0–2
Mqabba	3–0	1–1	—	2–2	1–1	2–1	2–0	4–4	0–0	1–1
Pietà Hotspurs	1–3	2–2	2–1	—	3–0	3–3	4–2	1–2	2–2	0–3
Rabat Ajax	0–4	0–4	2–0	0–1	—	1–2	2–0	1–2	2–1	1–3
San Ġwann	4–3	0–2	1–1	0–1	3–3	—	4–2	0–3	4–1	1–2
Senglea Athletic	0–5	2–2	1–3	1–1	0–2	0–1	—	2–1	3–0	0–1
St. George's	2–1	1–0	2–2	1–4	1–2	7–2	2–0	—	3–3	0–4
St. Patrick	0–0	4–0	1–1	1–3	1–0	2–0	3–2	1–0	—	1–3
Vittoriosa Stars	1–1	1–1	1–3	0–1	5–2	1–2	3–2	2–1	1–1	—

Legend: Blue = home team win; Yellow = draw; Red = away team win.

== Top scorers ==
As of 17 May 2009

Rank	Player	Club	Goals
1	(England) Simon Shead	Pietà Hotspurs	15
1	(Nigeria) Anthony Eviparker	Vittoriosa Stars	15
3	(Nigeria) Uchenna Anyanwu	Dingli Swallows	13
4	(Bulgaria) Martin Deanov	Pietà Hotspurs	11
5	(Nigeria) John Nwoba	St. George's	10
