= 2011–12 Maltese Second Division =

Maltese Second Division
- Season: 2011–12

The 2011–12 Maltese Second Division (referred to as the Bank of Valletta Second Division for sponsorship reasons) is the seventh season of the league under its current title and first season under its current league division format.

== Changes from previous season ==
- Attard F.C. (Promoted from 3rd Division)
- Birzebbuga St. Peters F.C. (Promoted to 1st Division)
- Gharghur F.C. (3rd Division Champions, Promoted from 3rd Division)
- Gudja United F.C. (Promoted from 3rd Division)
- Kirkop United F.C. (Promoted from 3rd Division)
- Luqa St. Andrew's F.C. (Promoted from 3rd Division)
- Mgarr United F.C. (Relegated to 3rd Division)
- Msida Saint-Joseph F.C. (Relegated from 1st Division)
- Naxxar Lions F.C. (Promoted to 1st Division)
- Rabat Ajax F.C. (2nd Division Runners-up, Promoted to 1st Division)
- Siggiewi F.C. (3rd Division Runners-up, Promoted from 3rd Division)
- St. Patrick F.C. (Promoted to 1st Division)
- St. Venera Lightning F.C. (Promoted from 3rd Division)
- Zejtun Corinthians F.C. (2nd Division Champions, Promoted to 1st Division)

== Stadia ==
Stadium	Location	Capacity
Centenary Stadium	Ta' Qali	2,000
Charles Abela Stadium	Mosta	600
Luxol Stadium	St. Andrews	800
Sirens Stadium	St. Paul's Bay	

== Final league table ==
Pos	Team	Pld	W	D	L	GF	GA	GD	Pts	Promotion or relegation
1	Gzira United F.C. (C)	26	18	6	2	58	16	+42	60	Champions and promotion to 2012–13 Maltese First Division
2	Gudja United F.C. (P)	26	16	6	4	57	20	+37	54	Promotion to 2012–13 Maltese First Division
3	Mellieha S.C.	26	16	6	4	51	27	+24	52 (Note: Mellieha S.C. where deducted two points after the accident involved in the match against Gudja United in the Second Round.)	
4	Gharghur F.C.	26	13	5	8	57	47	+10	44	
5	Zebbug Rangers F.C.	26	11	10	5	47	30	+17	43	
6	San Gwann F.C.	26	10	9	7	43	35	+8	39	
7	Msida Saint-Joseph F.C.	26	11	3	12	42	29	+13	36	
8	Kirkop United F.C.	26	11	2	13	44	52	−8	35	
9	St. Venera Lightning F.C.	26	9	6	11	27	45	−18	33	
10	Zurrieq F.C.	26	8	5	13	26	40	−14	29	
11	Siggiewi F.C.	26	7	6	13	31	51	−20	27	
12	Attard F.C. (R)	26	7	4	15	30	56	−26	25	Relegation to 2012–13 Maltese Third Division
13	Senglea Athletic F.C. (R)	26	4	3	19	34	71	−37	15	Relegation to 2012–13 Maltese Third Division
14	Luqa St. Andrew's F.C. (R)	26	4	3	19	24	62	−38	15	Relegation to 2012–13 Maltese Third Division

(C) Champions; (P) Promoted; (R) Relegated

== Results ==
Home \ Away	ATD	GHR	GDJ	GZR	KKP	LQA	MLH	MSD	SAG	SEN	SIG	STV	ZBG	ZRQ
Attard F.C.		1–6	1–0	0–2	0–2	4–1	1–2	0–2	2–2	1–0	1–1	1–2	2–2	0–1
Gharghur F.C.	1–1		4–2	0–4	5–2	0–1	0–1	0–3	2–1	2–2	4–2	1–0	3–1	3–0
Gudja United F.C.	4–1	3–2		0–0	3–0	0–0	2–0 (Note: Gudja United were awarded 2-0 victory after the game against Mellieha S.C. was abandoned.)	2–0	1–2	1–2	4–0	1–1	3–1	1–0
Gzira United F.C.	3–0	2–0	1–6		2–1	2–0	4–0	2–0	3–1	3–0	2–0	4–0	1–1	2–0
Kirkop United F.C.	2–0	2–1	0–4	3–1		3–1	0–3	1–3	2–3	1–4	3–2	5–1	1–1	1–1
Luqa St. Andrew's F.C.	5–1	2–2	0–5	0–5	3–1		0–1	0–3	1–5	2–4	0–3	0–2	1–3	2–1
Mellieha S.C.	4–1	1–1	1–1	0–0	1–0	4–1		1–0	2–1	5–0	1–0	4–0	3–3	3–3
Msida Saint-Joseph F.C.	1–2	1–4	1–1	0–1	0–1	1–0	4–1		0–2	3–0	4–2	1–3	1–1	0–1
San Gwann F.C.	1–3	0–0	1–3	0–0	2–1	0–0	2–3	1–1		3–0	2–1	1–0	3–3	0–1
Senglea Athletic F.C.	3–4	1–2	1–2	1–5	2–6	4–2	1–4	0–5	3–5		3–3	1–2	0–2	0–1
Siggiewi F.C.	3–1	3–2	1–3	0–5	2–3	1–0	0–3	0–3	1–1	1–0		1–1	0–0	3–2
St. Venera Lightning F.C.	0–2	0–6	0–4	1–2	2–0	2–1	1–0	2–1	1–1	1–1	0–0		1–3	1–2
Zebbug Rangers F.C.	3–0	1–4	0–0	0–0	3–0	3–0	0–2	1–0	1–1	4–1	3–0	1–2		3–0
Zurrieq F.C.	3–0	0–2	0–1	2–2	2–3	2–1	1–1	0–4	0–2	1–0	0–1	1–1	1–3	

Legend: Blue = home team win; Yellow = draw; Red = away team win.

== Top scorers ==
Goals	Player	Team
20	(Malta) Simon Shead	Gzira United
28	(Bulgaria) Rumen Kerekov	Kirkop United
17	(Bulgaria) Trayo Grozev	Gharghur F.C.
17	(Nigeria) John Roland Emeka	Senglea Athletic F.C.
15	(Nigeria) Uchenna Anyanwu	Zebbug Rangers F.C.
15	(Brazil) Fernando Donizete de Andrade	Msida Saint-Joseph F.C.
15	(Brazil) Tiago Loquete	Mellieha S.C.
12	(Malta) William Camenzuli	Gudja United F.C.
12	(Serbia) Ivan Stankovic	Kirkop United
