= 2012–13 Maltese Premier League =

Maltese Premier League
- Season: 2012–13
- Champions: Birkirkara (4th title)
- Relegated: Hamrun Spartans; Melita
- Champions League: Birkirkara
- Europa League: Hibernians; Valletta; Sliema Wanderers
- Top goalscorer: Negrin (22 goals)

The 2012–13 Maltese Premier League was the 98th season of the Maltese Premier League, the top-tier football league in Malta. It began in August 2012 and ended in May 2013. Valletta were the defending champions, having won their 21st title last season.

The Premier League consisted of two rounds. In the First Round, every team played each opponent twice, once "home" and once "away" (in actuality, the designation of home and away were purely arbitrary as most of the clubs did not have their own grounds), for a total of 22 games. The league was then split into two pools. Earned points were subsequently halved. Teams that finished in the positions 1–6 compete in the "Top Six" and teams that finished in positions 7–12 play in the "Play-Out".

== Teams ==
Marsaxlokk were relegated to the First Division after finishing in last place of the Play-Out last season. This ended a three-year stay in the Premier League for them.

Promoted to the top flight were Rabat Ajax, who returned to the Premier League after an eleven-season absence, and Melita, who became the first amateur club to reach the Premier League as well as being the only amateur club in the world taking part in the top tier of a professional league.

== Venues ==
2012–13 Maltese Premier League is located in Malta	Ta' Qali	Ta' Qali	Paola	Hamrun
2012–13 Maltese Premier League is located in Malta	Ta' Qali National Stadium	Centenary Stadium	Tony Bezzina Stadium	Victor Tedesco Stadium
2012–13 Maltese Premier League is located in Malta	Capacity: 16,997	Capacity: 3,000	Capacity: 2,968	Capacity: 1,962

=== Stadia and training grounds ===
Only a few stadia have the infrastructure needed to host Premier League matches. These are Ta' Qali National Stadium and Centenary Stadium at Ta' Qali, Victor Tedesco Stadium at Ħamrun and Hibernians Ground at Paola. Additional to that, each team has been assigned to a dedicated training ground. On a few occasions, Hibernians and Hamrun Spartans play at their home ground, but otherwise all games are played on neutral ground, rendering "home" and "away" games purely symbolic.

Location of teams in 2012–13 Maltese Premier Division

Team	Location of origin	Ground	Location of ground
Balzan	Balzan		
Birkirkara	Birkirkara	Infetti Ground	Birkirkara
Floriana	Floriana	Independence Parade Ground	Floriana
Hibernians	Paola	Hibernians Ground	Paola
Hamrun Spartans	Ħamrun	Victor Tedesco Stadium	Ħamrun
Mosta	Mosta	Charles Abela Stadium	Mosta
Melita	St. Julian's	Gianni Bencini Ground	St. Julian's
Qormi	Qormi	Thomaso Grounds	Qormi
Rabat Ajax	Rabat	Rabat Ajax Football Ground	Mtarfa
Sliema Wanderers	Sliema	Tigné Point	Sliema
Tarxien Rainbows	Tarxien	Tarxien Ground	Tarxien
Valletta	Valletta	Zebbug Rovers FC Ground / Melita Ground	Zebbug or St Julians

== First phase ==
=== League table ===
Pos	Team	Pld	W	D	L	GF	GA	GD	Pts	Qualification
1	Valletta	22	13	7	2	49	15	+34	46	Qualification for the Top Six
2	Hibernians	22	14	3	5	47	24	+23	45	Qualification for the Top Six
3	Birkirkara	22	12	7	3	47	19	+28	43	Qualification for the Top Six
4	Tarxien Rainbows	22	11	5	6	39	32	+7	38	Qualification for the Top Six
5	Sliema Wanderers	22	11	4	7	34	22	+12	37	Qualification for the Top Six
6	Mosta	22	11	1	10	39	33	+6	34	Qualification for the Top Six
7	Qormi	22	9	3	10	32	34	−2	30	Qualification for the Play-Out
8	Balzan	22	7	6	9	34	36	−2	27	Qualification for the Play-Out
9	Floriana	22	5	9	8	26	31	−5	24	Qualification for the Play-Out
10	Hamrun Spartans	22	4	4	14	24	58	−34	16	Qualification for the Play-Out
11	Melita	22	3	5	14	18	56	−38	14	Qualification for the Play-Out
12	Rabat Ajax	22	1	8	13	16	45	−29	11	Qualification for the Play-Out

Source: Malta Football Association
Rules for classification: 1) Points; 2) Play-offs (only if needed to decide champions, teams for relegation or teams for UEFA competitions).

=== Results ===
Home \ Away	BAL	BIR	FLO	HAM	HIB	MEL	MOS	QOR	RAB	SLI	TAR	VAL
Balzan	—	1–2	1–3	3–2	2–3	2–1	0–0	2–1	1–1	1–0	3–4	1–1
Birkirkara	2–2	—	1–1	1–3	1–0	4–0	7–1	2–1	2–0	1–3	5–0	1–1
Floriana	3–1	0–3	—	1–1	0–3	0–0	1–2	2–2	3–0	2–0	2–3	0–2
Hamrun Spartans	2–2	0–3	0–2	—	1–6	0–1	0–3	1–0	1–1	0–2	1–1	2–8
Hibernians	2–0	0–0	1–0	2–1	—	3–1	3–2	0–1	6–0	2–1	0–0	0–1
Melita	0–4	0–3	2–2	1–3	1–5	—	0–5	1–2	3–3	0–0	0–3	1–5
Mosta	2–0	0–1	3–1	4–1	0–1	3–1	—	4–2	2–0	0–2	1–3	1–3
Qormi	1–2	1–1	0–0	4–0	2–4	2–3	2–1	—	3–0	2–1	2–1	0–2
Rabat Ajax	0–2	3–3	1–1	1–3	0–3	0–0	3–2	0–1	—	0–2	1–3	1–1
Sliema Wanderers	3–2	0–0	1–1	2–1	4–0	4–0	0–2	3–1	1–0	—	1–2	0–2
Tarxien Rainbows	2–1	1–4	1–1	4–1	2–2	2–0	2–0	1–2	1–0	2–3	—	1–1
Valletta	1–1	1–0	3–0	6–0	4–1	1–2	0–1	3–0	1–1	1–1	1–0	—

Source: Malta Football Association
Legend: Blue = home team win; Yellow = draw; Red = away team win.

== Second phase ==
=== Top Six ===
Pos	Team	Pld	W	D	L	GF	GA	GD	Pts	Qualification	BIR	HIB	VAL	SLI	TAR	MOS
1	Birkirkara (Note: Birkirkara and Hibernians finished equal on points, and a Championship play-off to determine the winner was won by Birkirkara) (C)	32	19	9	4	62	22	+40	45	Qualification for the 2013–14 UEFA Champions League	—	1–0	1–0	1–0	1–0	7–1
2	Hibernians (Note: The winners of the 2012–13 Maltese FA Trophy.)	32	21	4	7	70	33	+37	45	Qualification for the 2013–14 UEFA Europa League	1–1	—	4–2	0–2	3–0	6–0
3	Valletta	32	17	8	7	69	27	+42	36	Qualification for the 2013–14 UEFA Europa League	0–2	1–2	—	0–0	3–1	6–1
4	Sliema Wanderers	32	16	6	10	48	32	+16	36	Qualification for the 2013–14 UEFA Europa League	1–0	2–3	0–2	—	0–0	4–1
5	Tarxien Rainbows	32	14	6	12	54	51	+3	29		0–1	0–3	3–2	3–4	—	4–2
6	Mosta	32	11	2	19	45	72	−27	18		0–0	1–3	0–5	0–1	0–3	—

Source: Malta Football Association: ,
Rules for classification: 1) Points; 2) Play-offs (only if needed to decide champions, teams for relegation or teams for UEFA competitions).
(C) Champions

=== Play-Out ===
Pos	Team	Pld	W	D	L	GF	GA	GD	Pts	Relegation	FLO	QOR	BAL	RAB	HAM	MEL
7	Floriana	32	14	10	8	48	38	+10	40		—	1–0	1–1	2–1	3–1	2–0
8	Qormi	32	15	4	13	61	50	+11	34		2–4	—	5–2	4–0	6–2	2–0
9	Balzan	32	9	9	14	48	61	−13	23		0–2	4–4	—	0–5	3–1	0–0
10	Rabat Ajax	32	6	9	17	38	60	−22	22		1–2	2–1	3–0	—	1–2	2–2
11	Hamrun Spartans (R)	32	6	5	21	39	88	−49	15	Relegation to the 2013–14 Maltese First Division	0–3	0–2	3–2	1–3	—	3–5
12	Melita (R)	32	4	8	20	31	78	−47	13	Relegation to the 2013–14 Maltese First Division	1–2	1–3	1–2	1–4	2–2	—

Source: Malta Football Association: ,
Rules for classification: 1) Points; 2) Play-offs (only if needed to decide champions, teams for relegation or teams for UEFA competitions).
(R) Relegated

== Championship play-off ==
At the end of the season, Birkirkara and Hibernians finished off equal by 45 points. On the Final Matchday of the season, on 3 May 2013, Birkirkara beat Tarxien Rainbows 1–0. And on 5 May 2013, Hibernians beat Valletta 2–1. Both teams ended with the same points. A play-off decided the title.

11 May 2013
18:00

Birkirkara	3–1	Hibernians
Herrera 56'; Vukanac 67'; Muscat 74'		Failla 33' (pen.)

Ta' Qali National Stadium, Ta' Qali
Attendance: 9,200
Referee: Alan Mario Sant
- Birkirkara qualified for the 2013–14 UEFA Champions League.
- Hibernians qualified for the 2013–14 UEFA Europa League.

== Season statistics ==
=== Top scorers ===
Rank	Player	Club	Goals
1	(Spain) Negrin	Rabat Ajax / Melita	22
2	(Brazil) Daniel Bueno	Tarxien Rainbows	19
3	(Malta) Michael Mifsud	Valletta	18
4	(Malta) Ryan Darmanin	Balzan	14
4	(Brazil) Elton	Balzan	14
4	(Brazil) Jhonnattann	Birkirkara	14
4	(Brazil) Igor Coronado	Floriana	14
8	(Malta) Clayton Failla	Hibernians	13
9	(Bulgaria) Danail Mitev	Mosta	12
9	(Nigeria) Obinna Obiefule	Mosta / Hibernians	12
