= Leontin Chițescu =

Romanian footballer

Leontin Chitescu
Personal information
- Date of birth: 3 May 1980 (age 46)
- Place of birth: Timișoara, Romania
- Positions: Forward; midfielder

Senior career*
Years	Team	Apps	(Gls)
2000–2002	Poli Timişoara	15	(3)
2002–2005	UTA Arad	52	(5)
2005–2007	CFR Cluj	20	(7)
2006–2007	→ Unirea Dej (loan)	8	(1)
2007–2008	PSM Makassar	26	(12)
2008–2009	Persib Bandung	12	(2)
2009–2010	Arema Malang	14	(3)
2010–2011	Vittoriosa Stars	25	(12)
2011–2012	Chiangrai United F.C.	24	(5)
2012–2013	Phang Nga F.C.	30	(7)
Total		226	(57)
- * Club domestic league appearances and goals

Leontin Chitescu (born 3 May 1980) is a former professional footballer who played as a forward and midfielder.

== Playing career ==
In October 2009, Maltese First Division side Vittoriosa Stars announced that they had signed Leontin Chitescu on a free transfer.
