= 2008–09 Maltese Third Division =

Maltese Third Division
- Season: 2008–09

The Maltese Third Division 2008–09 (known as the BOV 3rd Division 2008–09 due to sponsorship reasons) is the 9th season of the Maltese Third Division. It started in September 2008 and ended in late May 2009, with the promotion play-off finals. This division is divided into two sections: Section A, with ten teams and Section B, with nine. The winners from both sections will face each other in a play-off where the winner is crowned as champion of this division, but both teams will still be given promotion to the Second Division.

Gharghur were the winners of Section A, while Gzira United were the winners of Section B. Gzira United finished the season as overall champions after they beat Gharghur 3–0.

Zurrieq were also promoted after winning the promotion play-offs, beating Santa Lucia on penalties in the final. Santa Lucia beat Naxxar Lions in the semi-final.

== Clubs ==
=== Section A ===
- Fgura
- Gharghur
- Ghaxaq
- Gudja
- Kalkara
- Luqa
- Mdina
- Qrendi
- Sirens
- Xghajra

=== Section B ===
- Attard
- Gzira
- Kirkop
- Mtarfa
- Pembroke
- Siggiewi
- Santa Lucia
- Zejtun
- Zurrieq

== Changes from previous season ==
Relegated from 2007–08 Maltese Second Division

- Sirens F.C.
- Zurrieq F.C.

== League table ==
=== Section A ===
Pos	Team	Pld	W	D	L	GF	GA	GD	Pts	Promotion or qualification
1	Gharghur (C, P)	18	12	4	2	36	15	+21	40	Promoted to 2009–10 Maltese Second Division
2	Mdina Knights	18	9	5	4	33	22	+11	32	Qualified for promotion-relegation play-off
3	Gudja United	18	8	6	4	27	18	+9	30	Qualified for promotion-relegation play-off
4	Ghaxaq	18	8	5	5	25	24	+1	29	
5	Kalkara	18	7	3	8	24	27	−3	24	
6	Xghajra Tornadoes	18	5	7	6	19	22	−3	22	
7	Sirens	18	6	3	9	22	22	0	21	
8	Fgura United	18	4	6	8	12	21	−9	18	
9	Luqa St. Andrew's	18	4	3	11	17	30	−13	15	
10	Qrendi	18	2	8	8	12	27	−15	14	

(C) Champions; (P) Promoted

=== Section B ===
Pos	Team	Pld	W	D	L	GF	GA	GD	Pts	Promotion or qualification
1	Gzira United (C, P)	16	11	5	0	25	9	+16	38	Promoted to 2009–10 Maltese Second Division
2	Zurrieq (P)	16	10	4	2	25	11	+14	34	Qualified for promotion-relegation play-off
3	Santa Lucia	16	7	6	3	20	12	+8	27	Qualified for promotion-relegation play-off
4	Siggiewi	16	7	4	5	26	20	+6	25	
5	Attard	16	4	6	6	17	20	−3	18	
6	Zejtun Corinthians	16	5	3	8	18	22	−4	18	
7	Pembroke Athleta	16	5	1	10	18	24	−6	16	
8	Kirkop United	16	3	7	6	12	20	−8	16	
9	Mtarfa	16	1	2	13	7	28	−21	5	

(C) Champions; (P) Promoted

== Champions playoff ==
Team 1	Score	Team 2
Gharghur	0–3	Gzira United

== Promotion-relegation play-off ==
Participating

Club	Position
Gudja United	3rd in 3rd Division Section A
Mdina Knights	2nd in 3rd Division Section A
Naxxar Lions	10th in Maltese Second Division 2007-08
Santa Lucia	3rd in 3rd Division Section B
Zurrieq	2nd in 3rd Division Section B

Quarter final

Team 1	Score	Team 2
Gudja United	0–2	Santa Lucia

- Gudja United remain in Maltese Third Division

Semi-finals

Team 1	Score	Team 2
Mdina Knights	0–1	Zurrieq
Naxxar Lions	0–1	Santa Lucia

- Mdina Knights remain in Maltese Third Division
- Naxxar Lions relegated to Maltese Third Division

Final

Team 1	Score	Team 2
Zurrieq	2–2 (a.e.t.) (5–4 p)	Santa Lucia

- Zurrieq promoted to Maltese Second Division
- Santa Lucia remain in Maltese Third Division

== Results ==
=== Section A ===
Home \ Away	FGR	GHR	GXQ	GDJ	KKR	LQA	MDN	QRD	SIR	XJR
Fgura		1–0	2–2	0–0	1–3	2–1	1–1	1–0	0–3	0–0
Gharghur	2–1		4–1	1–0	3–0	4–0	4–1	2–0	1–0	2–2
Ghaxaq	1–0	2–3		1–3	1–4	2–1	0–2	0–0	3–2	4–0
Gudja	1–0	1–1	2–2		3–2	2–0	1–2	3–0	2–1	1–2
Kalkara	2–0	2–4	1–1	1–3		0–3	0–1	0–0	1–0	2–1
Luqa	0–2	2–1	0–2	0–0	0–1		1–5	0–0	2–3	3–1
Mdina	4–1	0–0	0–1	3–2	3–2	1–1		0–1	3–2	0–1
Qrendi	0–0	2–2	1–3	1–1	1–1	1–0	1–4		0–2	2–2
Sirens	2–1	0–1	0–1	0–0	2–1	1–2	1–1	2–1		0–1
Xghajra	0–0	0–1	0–0	0–2	0–1	2–1	2–2	4–1	1–1	

Legend: Blue = home team win; Yellow = draw; Red = away team win.

=== Section B ===
Home \ Away	ATD	GZR	KKP	MTF	PBK	SGW	SLC	ZTN	ZRQ
Attard		1–1	0–0	3–0	2–0	1–3	0–0	2–1	0–2
Gzira	2–1		1–0	3–2	3–1	1–1	0–0	1–0	3–0
Kirkop	0–0	0–0		2–0	1–0	1–4	1–1	0–4	2–2
Mtarfa	1–2	1–1	0–2		0–1	0–3	0–0	0–2	0–3
Pembroke	4–1	1–2	1–1	0–1		1–0	1–3	1–0	1–2
Siggiewi	0–0	0–3	2–1	1–0	3–4		2–3	3–0	0–0
St. Lucia	2–0	0–1	2–0	1–0	1–0	3–1		1–1	1–1
Zejtun	0–0	1–2	0–0	3–2	3–2	1–2	2–1		0–2
Zurrieq	2–0	0–1	3–1	1–0	1–0	1–1	2–1	3–0	

Legend: Blue = home team win; Yellow = draw; Red = away team win.
