= 2010–11 Maltese Premier League =

Maltese Premier League
- Season: 2010–11
- Champions: Valletta (20th title)
- Relegated: Vittoriosa S.
- Champions League: Valletta
- Europa League: Floriana
- Matches: 132
- Goals: 411 (3.11 per match)
- Biggest home win: Valletta 5-0 Hamrun Spartans
- Biggest away win: Vittoriosa S. 1–6 Floriana
- Highest scoring: Marsaxlokk 6-3 Hamrun Spartans

The 2010–11 Maltese Premier League is the 96th season of the Maltese Premier League, the top-tier football league in Malta. It began in August 2010 and ended in May 2011. Birkirkara are the defending champions, having won their third title last season.

The Premier League consists of two rounds. In the first round, every team plays each opponent twice, once "home" and once "away" (in actuality, the designation of home and away is purely arbitrary as most of the clubs do not have their own grounds), for a total of 18 games. The league then splits into two pools. Earned points are subsequently halved. Teams that finish in positions 1–6 compete in the "Top Six" and teams that finish in positions 7–10 play in the "Play-Out".

On 13 January 2011, the Malta Football Association decided to expand the league to 12 teams as from the 2011–12 season. Therefore, changes had to be made to accommodate the new number of teams. Thus only one team would be relegated at the end of this season.

== Teams ==
Dingli Swallows and Msida St. Joseph were relegated to the First Division after finishing in the last two places of the Play-Out.

Promoted from the First Division were Marsaxlokk as champions and Vittoriosa Stars as runners-up. Both of these clubs were supposed to take part in last season's competition, but each of them were found guilty in a corruption scandal and were immediately relegated to the First Division.

== Venues ==
| 2010–11 Maltese Premier League is located in Malta | Ta' Qali | Ta' Qali | Paola | Hamrun |
|---|---|---|---|---|
| 2010–11 Maltese Premier League is located in Malta | Ta' Qali National Stadium | Centenary Stadium | Tony Bezzina Stadium | Victor Tedesco Stadium |
| 2010–11 Maltese Premier League is located in Malta | Capacity: 16,997 | Capacity: 3,000 | Capacity: 2,968 | Capacity: 1,962 |

=== Stadia and training grounds ===
Only a few stadia have the infrastructure needed to host Premier League matches. These are Ta' Qali National Stadium and Centenary Stadium at Ta' Qali, Victor Tedesco Stadium at Ħamrun and Hibernians Ground at Paola. Additional to that, each team has been assigned to a dedicated training ground. On a few occasions, Hibernians and Hamrun Spartans play at their home ground, but otherwise all games are played on neutral ground, rendering "home" and "away" games purely symbolic.

Location of teams in 2010–11 Maltese Premier Division

| Team | Location of origin | Ground | Location of ground |
|---|---|---|---|
| Birkirkara | Birkirkara | Infetti Ground | Birkirkara |
| Floriana | Floriana | Victor Tedesco Stadium | Ħamrun |
| Hibernians | Paola | Hibernians Ground | Paola |
| Hamrun Spartans | Ħamrun | Victor Tedesco Stadium | Ħamrun |
| Marsaxlokk | Marsaxlokk | Marsaxlokk Ground | Marsaxlokk |
| Qormi | Qormi | Thomaso Grounds | Qormi |
| Sliema Wanderers | Sliema | Tigné Point | Sliema |
| Tarxien Rainbows | Tarxien | Tarxien Ground | Tarxien |
| Valletta | Valletta | Salinos Ground | Valletta |
| Vittoriosa Stars | Vittoriosa | Marsaxlokk Ground | Marsaxlokk |

== First phase ==
=== League table ===
| Pos | Team | Pld | W | D | L | GF | GA | GD | Pts | Qualification |
|---|---|---|---|---|---|---|---|---|---|---|
| 1 | Valletta | 18 | 13 | 5 | 0 | 42 | 11 | +31 | 44 | Qualification for the Top Six |
| 2 | Tarxien Rainbows | 18 | 8 | 5 | 5 | 25 | 22 | +3 | 29 | Qualification for the Top Six |
| 3 | Floriana | 18 | 8 | 3 | 7 | 25 | 20 | +5 | 27 | Qualification for the Top Six |
| 4 | Birkirkara | 18 | 7 | 6 | 5 | 25 | 25 | 0 | 27 | Qualification for the Top Six |
| 5 | Marsaxlokk | 18 | 5 | 9 | 4 | 25 | 25 | 0 | 24 | Qualification for the Top Six |
| 6 | Hamrun Spartans | 18 | 7 | 2 | 9 | 31 | 36 | −5 | 23 | Qualification for the Top Six |
| 7 | Sliema Wanderers | 18 | 5 | 7 | 6 | 22 | 26 | −4 | 22 | Qualification for the Play-Out |
| 8 | Qormi | 18 | 5 | 6 | 7 | 22 | 26 | −4 | 21 | Qualification for the Play-Out |
| 9 | Hibernians | 18 | 3 | 6 | 9 | 23 | 33 | −10 | 15 | Qualification for the Play-Out |
| 10 | Vittoriosa Stars | 18 | 2 | 5 | 11 | 20 | 36 | −16 | 11 | Qualification for the Play-Out |

Rules for classification: 1) Points; 2) Play-offs (only if needed to decide champions, teams for relegation or teams for UEFA competitions). Teams ranked 1 through 6 qualified for the championship pool, teams ranked 7 through 10 played in the relegation pool. Earned points were halved and taken over to the respective pools.

=== Results ===
| Home \ Away | BIR | FLO | HIB | HAM | MRS | QOR | SLI | TAR | VAL | VIT |
|---|---|---|---|---|---|---|---|---|---|---|
| Birkirkara | — | 0–2 | 3–1 | 2–0 | 2–5 | 1–4 | 2–2 | 0–0 | 2–2 | 1–1 |
| Floriana | 0–1 | — | 1–3 | 3–1 | 0–1 | 4–3 | 0–1 | 0–2 | 0–2 | 0–0 |
| Hibernians | 1–2 | 1–1 | — | 3–4 | 2–2 | 0–0 | 0–0 | 3–1 | 2–2 | 1–2 |
| Hamrun Spartans | 1–1 | 1–2 | 2–4 | — | 2–3 | 2–1 | 3–2 | 3–1 | 0–2 | 2–0 |
| Marsaxlokk | 2–0 | 0–3 | 2–2 | 2–1 | — | 0–1 | 0–0 | 2–4 | 0–2 | 2–2 |
| Qormi | 0–2 | 0–1 | 1–0 | 1–3 | 2–2 | — | 0–0 | 2–1 | 0–4 | 2–2 |
| Sliema Wanderers | 1–4 | 0–1 | 4–0 | 3–1 | 1–1 | 0–0 | — | 1–1 | 1–4 | 4–3 |
| Tarxien Rainbows | 0–0 | 3–1 | 2–0 | 3–1 | 0–0 | 1–1 | 2–1 | — | 0–2 | 1–0 |
| Valletta | 3–1 | 0–0 | 2–0 | 1–1 | 0–0 | 1–0 | 4–0 | 5–2 | — | 3–0 |
| Vittoriosa Stars | 0–1 | 1–6 | 2–0 | 2–3 | 1–1 | 2–4 | 0–1 | 0–1 | 2–3 | — |

Source: Soccerway
Legend: Blue = home team win; Yellow = draw; Red = away team win.

== Second phase ==
=== Top Six ===
| Pos | Team | Pld | W | D | L | GF | GA | GD | Pts | Qualification | VAL | FLO | BIR | MRS | TAR | HAM |
|---|---|---|---|---|---|---|---|---|---|---|---|---|---|---|---|---|
| 1 | Valletta (C) | 28 | 18 | 10 | 0 | 59 | 17 | +42 | 42 | Qualification for the 2011–12 UEFA Champions League | — | 3–0 | 1–1 | 1–1 | 2–2 | 5–0 |
| 2 | Floriana | 28 | 14 | 5 | 9 | 46 | 32 | +14 | 34 | Qualification for the 2011–12 UEFA Europa League (Note: Floriana won the 2010–11 Maltese FA Trophy competition. Therefore, Floriana and Birkirkara qualify for the 2011–12 UEFA Europa League.) | 1–1 | — | 3–0 | 1–1 | 5–1 | 2–0 |
| 3 | Birkirkara | 28 | 11 | 9 | 8 | 42 | 40 | +2 | 29 | Qualification for the 2011–12 UEFA Europa League | 0–1 | 1–5 | — | 2–0 | 3–0 | 2–2 |
| 4 | Marsaxlokk | 28 | 9 | 11 | 8 | 45 | 43 | +2 | 26 | | 0–1 | 4–0 | 1–4 | — | 2–4 | 6–3 |
| 5 | Tarxien Rainbows | 28 | 10 | 7 | 11 | 41 | 45 | −4 | 23 | | 0–1 | 1–2 | 1–3 | 0–1 | — | 3–3 |
| 6 | Hamrun Spartans | 28 | 7 | 6 | 15 | 44 | 66 | −22 | 16 | | 1–1 | 0–2 | 1–1 | 2–4 | 1–4 | — |

Legend: Blue = home team win; Yellow = draw; Red = away team win.
Rules for classification: 1) Points; 2) Play-offs (only if needed to decide champions, teams for relegation or teams for UEFA competitions). Points earned in the first round have been halved and rounded up.
(C) Champions

=== Play-Out ===
| Pos | Team | Pld | W | D | L | GF | GA | GD | Pts | Relegation | SLI | QOR | HIB | VIT |
|---|---|---|---|---|---|---|---|---|---|---|---|---|---|---|
| 7 | Sliema Wanderers | 24 | 10 | 7 | 7 | 37 | 31 | +6 | 26 | | — | 4–1 | 0–1 | 2–0 |
| 8 | Qormi | 24 | 7 | 7 | 10 | 37 | 43 | −6 | 18 | | 0–4 | — | 5–2 | 2–2 |
| 9 | Hibernians | 24 | 6 | 6 | 12 | 34 | 46 | −12 | 17 | | 2–3 | 4–3 | — | 2–1 |
| 10 | Vittoriosa Stars (R) | 24 | 3 | 6 | 15 | 26 | 48 | −22 | 10 | Relegation to the 2011–12 Maltese First Division | 1–2 | 1–4 | 1–0 | — |

Legend: Blue = home team win; Yellow = draw; Red = away team win.
Rules for classification: 1) Points; 2) Play-offs (only if needed to decide champions, teams for relegation or teams for UEFA competitions). Points earned in the first round have been halved and rounded up.
(R) Relegated

== Top goalscorers ==
| Rank | Player | Club | Goals |
|---|---|---|---|
| 1 | (Nigeria) Alfred Effiong | Marsaxlokk | 17 |
| 2 | (Malta) Terence Scerri | Valletta | 16 |
| 3 | (Malta) Gaetan Spiteri | Hamrun Spartans | 14 |
| 4 | (Nigeria) Daniel Nwoke | Floriana | 13 |
| 4 | (Malta) Jean Pierre Mifsud Triganza | Sliema Wanderers | 13 |
| 6 | (Brazil) Daniel Mariano Bueno | Tarxien Rainbows | 11 |
| 6 | (Brazil) Denni | Valletta | 11 |
| 8 | (Brazil) Sergio | Tarxien Rainbows | 10 |
| 9 | (Malta) Michael Galea | Birkirkara | 9 |
| 9 | (Argentina) Emiliano Lattes | Birkirkara | 9 |
| 9 | (Malta) Ivan Woods | Floriana | 9 |
