= Lija Athletic F.C. =

Maltese association football club

- Full name: Lija Athletic Football Club
- Nicknames: Tal-Larinġ, Tan-Nar
- Founded: 1949; 77 years ago
- Ground: Lija Athletic Sports Complex
- Capacity: 500
- Chairman: Colin Ciantar
- Head Coach: Joseph Galea
- League: BOV National League I
- 2026–27: BOV National League I, 6th
- Website: www.lijaathletic.com
Home colours	Away colours

Lija Athletic Football Club, commonly referred to as Lija Athletic, is a football team originating from the village of Lija, Malta. The present club was founded in 1949 and has competed in the Maltese Premier League five times. During the 2025–26 BOV Amateur League 1 campaign, Lija Athletic narrowly missed out on promotion back to the BOV Challenge League following a disappointing start to the season. However, the team regained momentum on Matchday 6 with a victory over eventual champions Attard. This result sparked an impressive run of form, as Lija went on to record a 12-match unbeaten streak—the longest in the league. Despite this resurgence, it ultimately proved insufficient to secure a return to the second tier of Maltese football.

== History ==
Although the first team in Lija is believed to have been formed in the 1930s, the first team to take part in the competitions organised by the Malta Football Association were Lija Amateurs. Lija Amateurs were founded in 1944 and in season 1944–45, they took part in the Second Division. The team was disbanded after three years.

In 1948–49, the present club, Lija Athletic were founded. The club joined the MFA and played in Division Three. The team was gaining momentum, until during a Third Division league match against Qormi Youngsters in March 1957, the referee abandoned the game due to fighting between the players. The MFA suspended the club from all football activities. However this decision was reviewed and the team was back in 1958.

The club tasted its first success when winning the Third Division Championship in 1962–63. The team was relegated in 1968–69 and it took Lija Athletic nine years to regain promotion to the Second Division, once again winning the Third Division title. The introduction of the Premier Division by the MFA in 1980 meant that all clubs were promoted by one division. Lija Athletic found themselves in the First Division. After a rather good performance during the first season in Division One, Lija were relegated in 1981–82.

The club won promotion to the First Division in 1987–88, but after one year they were back to Division Two. In 1990–91, Lija Athletic were relegated to the Third Division. After three years in Division Three, the Athletic won three consecutive promotions way up to the Premier League after winning the championships of Divisions Three and Two and placing second in Division One. In the Premier League for the first time ever, during the 1996–97 season, Lija Athletic had a very hard time with the big guns of local football, and were relegated after placing last.

Lija Athletic regained Premiership status after placing second in the 2001–02 season, and after a quick return to Division One, they managed to regain promotion thanks to the runner-up position obtained in the 2003–04 season. Once again the Premier Division challenge was too much, and with 3 wins, 2 draws and 19 lost games, Lija finished in last place. In 2005–06 Lija Athletic continued the habit of leaving their division after one year, but this time the destination was the Second Division, after finishing 9th with 18 points in 18 games. In 2006–07 the team obtained a mid-table position, finishing in 7th place. In spite of a poorer record, the team climbed to 6th place the following season. In 2008–09 Lija Athletic were able to challenge for promotion, although they had to settle for third place behind Melita FC and local rivals Balzan Youths, thereby just missing out.

The 2009–10 season saw Lija Athletic strengthening the squad with several experienced players and some talented youngsters. From the early stages, it was obvious the team would again be challengers for promotion, and with 48 points Lija Athletic won the Second Division championship and secured promotion to the First Division.

In the 2013–14 season, Lija Athletic reached a new milestone when qualifying for the FA Trophy semi-finals for the first time in the club's history, following exceptional wins including one against Premier giants, Floriana F.C. Lija Athletic were eliminated from the competition with a 0–1 loss to Qormi F.C. in the FA Trophy semi-final.

Following seven (7) seasons in the First Division, Lija Athletic regained promotion to the top flight, the Premier League, for the fourth time in the club's history, this time winning the First Division League with a total of 54 points. This is the first time in the club's history that Lija Athletic won the First Division Championship, with a relatively young squad.

In 2019–20, Lija achieved promotion to the top tier of Maltese football for the fifth time in their history. However, as with previous seasons, their stay in the top tier was short-lived, and they were relegated after just one season. Despite the setback, this season stood out as the best performance in the club's history, securing 5 wins and a total of 20 points. Noteworthy victories over Floriana and a draw with eventual champions Ħamrun highlighted that particular campaign.

The year 2024 held special significance for Lija Athletic, marking its 75th anniversary since the club was established in 1949. The year kicked off on a positive note with a victory over Żejtun. Prolific striker Erjon Beu added to the celebration by scoring his 150th goal for the club. However, the remainder of the year was not one of triumph. Despite the celebrations, the club faced a challenging season, enduring a series of tough defeats that dampened the festive spirit. On the final matchday of the 2024/25 campaign, Lija suffered relegation to the National Amateur League 1, missing out on survival by just a single point. Yet, the anniversary remained a reminder of the club's rich history and the resilience of its people, determined to see their team rise again.

== Kits ==
Period	Kit supplier	Shirt sponsor (front)
2009-19	(Germany) Adidas (EuroSport)	Falzon Group of Companies Ltd.
2019-20	(Italy) Macron (TeamSport)	Falzon Group of Companies Ltd., Take A Break Travel, the Teambar
2020-21	(Italy) Macron (TeamSport)	Falzon Group of Companies Ltd., GCS Malta
2021-22	(Italy) Macron (TeamSport)	Falzon Group of Companies Ltd., GCS Malta, Gracy's Malta
2022-26	(Italy) Macron (TeamSport)	Falzon Group of Companies Ltd.

== Players ==
=== Current squad (2026–2027) ===
Note: Flags indicate national team as defined under FIFA eligibility rules; some limited exceptions apply. Players may hold more than one non-FIFA nationality.

No.	Pos.	Nation	Player
1	GK	MLT	Jake Mallia
2	DF	MLT	Luke Fenech
3	DF	MLT	Matteo Fenech
4	DF	MLT	Leon Muscat
5	MF	MLT	Jamie Magri Overend
7	FW	MLT	Erjon Beu (Vice-Captain)
8	MF	MLT	Luca Felice
9	FW	SCO	Ross McParland
10	FW	BRA	Gabriel Vilas Boas
11	FW	MLT	Neil Buttigieg
12	GK	MLT	Luke Bonnici (Captain)
14	DF	MLT	Julian Xuereb
15	MF	MLT	Matthew Farrugia
16	DF	MLT	Randall Vella

No.	Pos.	Nation	Player
17	MF	MLT	Thomas Grech
18	DF	MLT	Benjamin Micallef
20	MF	MLT	Gabriel Borg
21	FW	COL	Thomas Nunez
22	DF	MLT	Gabriel Azzopardi
24	DF	MLT	Lee Ciantar
25	MF	MLT	Neil Said
26	FW	MLT	Darion Xuereb Pavia
28	DF	MLT	Gabriel Micallef Ghigo
32	DF	MLT	Clarence Scicluna
66	MF	MLT	Omar Khatib
77	DF	MLT	Yanis Tonna
90	FW	NGR	Abdulhadi Ibrahim Sheikh

=== Out on loan ===
Note: Flags indicate national team as defined under FIFA eligibility rules; some limited exceptions apply. Players may hold more than one non-FIFA nationality.

No.	Pos.	Nation	Player
N/A	N/A	To be determined	N/A (at N/A)

=== Retired numbers ===
No.	Player	Nationality	Position	Debut	Last match
6	Daniel Scerri	Malta	Midfielder	27 September 2003 vs Naxxar	23 April 2023 vs Fgura

== Staff & Administration ==
=== Technical team (2026–2027) ===
Position	Name
Head Coach	(Malta) Joseph Galea
Assistant Coach	(Malta) Ryan Zammit
Goalkeepers Coach	(Malta) Rodrick Sciberras
Team Managers	(Malta) Daniel Scerri (Malta) Clayton Giordimaina
U/19 Coach	(Malta) Ivan Falzon
Team Doctor	(Malta) Dr. David Tanti
Physiotherapist	(Malta) TBA
Kit Manager	(Malta) Benjamin Dingli
Asst. Kit Manager	(Malta) Nicholas Saliba

=== Administration (2026–2027) ===
Position	Name
President	(Malta) Colin Ciantar
Sen. Vice President	(Malta) Emanuel Bezzina
Vice President	(Malta) Robert Magro
Hon. Secretary	(Malta) Samuel Cutajar
Asst. Secretary	(Malta) Nicholas Saliba
Treasurer	(Malta) Malcolm Seychell
Administrator	(Malta) Samuel Cutajar
Club Delegates	(Malta) Samuel Cutajar (Malta) Robert Magro
Legal Advisor	(Malta) Dr. Peter Fenech (Malta) Dr. Andrei Vella
Social Media/PRO	(Malta) Nicholas Saliba (Malta) Samuel Cutajar
Spiritual Director	(Malta) Rev. Can. Fr. Joseph Cilia
Committee Members	(Malta) Steve Spiteri Fiteni (Malta) Clayton Giordimaina (Malta) Larken Micallef (Malta) Louis Fenech (Malta) Sunny Scerri (Malta) Benjamin Dingli

=== Managerial History (2000 - present) ===
Dates	Name
2002 - 2004	(Malta) Patrick Curmi
2004 - 2005	(Albania) Ilir Pelinku
2005 - 2007	(Malta) Jimmy Briffa
2007 - 2008	(Malta) Anthony Grech
2008 - 2009	(Albania) Ilir Pelinku
2009 - 2011	(Malta) Marco Gerada
2011 - 2014	(Malta) Brian Spiteri
2014 - 2015	(Malta) Joseph Brincat
2015 - 2016	(Malta) Brian Spiteri
2016 – 2025	(Malta) Joseph Galea

Dates	Name
2025 - 2026	(Malta) Ivan Zammit
2026 -	(Malta) Joseph Galea

== Records ==
=== Club Top Appearances ===
As of 19 November 2026

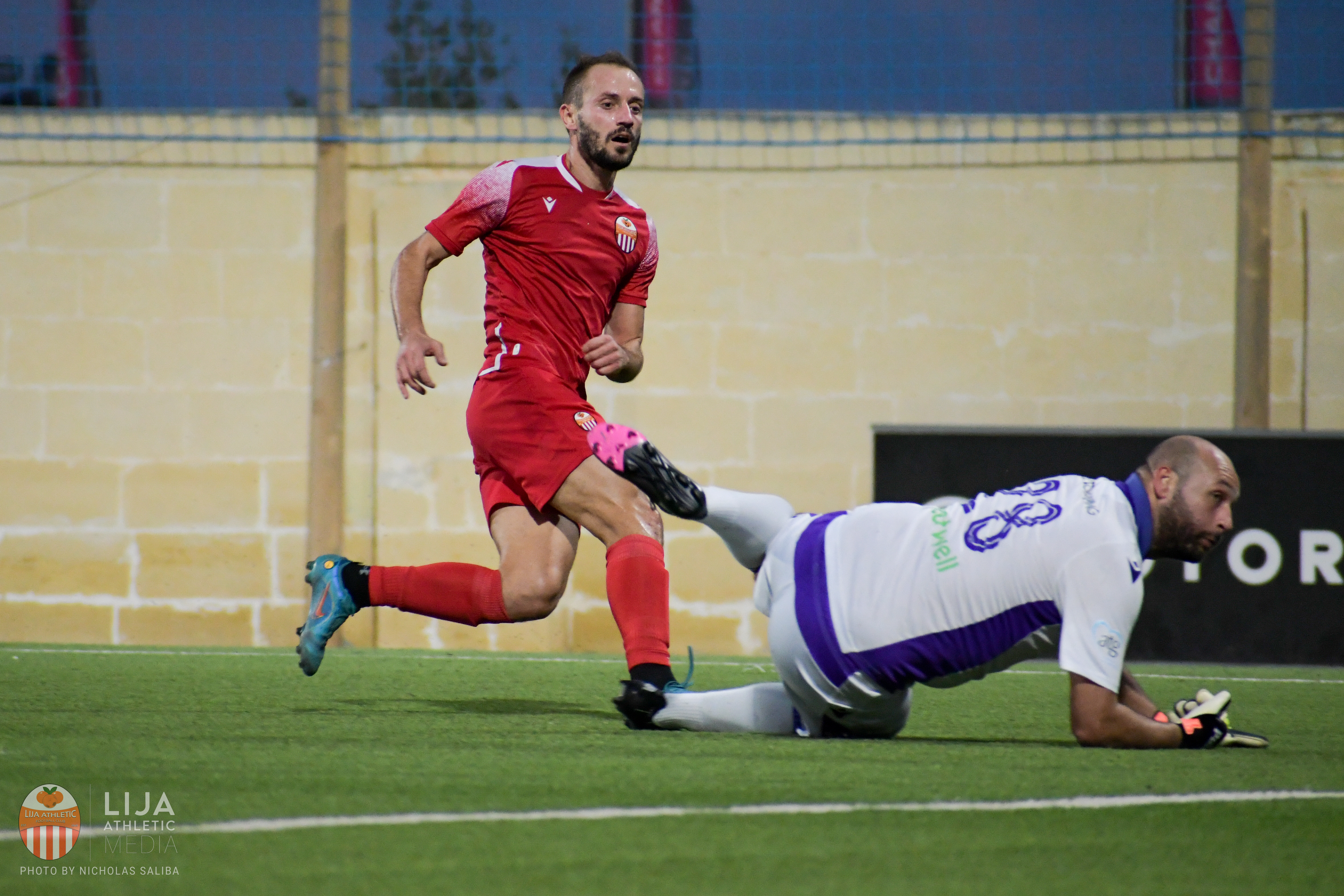
Erjon Beu is Lija's all-time top scorer with 168 goals to his name across all competitions

Player	Apps
(Malta) Daniel Scerri	408
(Malta) Luke Bonnici	400
(Malta) John Cuschieri	305
(Malta) Erjon Beu	286
(Malta) Beppe Antignolo	245
(Malta) Clayton Giordimaina	244
(Malta) Leon Muscat	227
(Malta) Joe Cardona	217
(Malta) Raymond Borg	207
(Malta) Glenn Barry	195

=== Club Top Scorers ===
As of 19 November 2026

Player	Goals	Apps	Ratio
(Malta) Erjon Beu	169	286	0.59
(Malta) Glenn Barry	65	195	0.33
(Tunisia) Ridha Dardouri	50	73	0.68
(Nigeria) Ige Abdullahi Adeshina	50	147	0.34
(Malta) Beppe Antignolo	49	245	0.20

== Honours ==
=== League ===
- First Division
  - Winners (1): 2016–17
- Second Division
  - Winners (1): 2009–10
- Third Division (3rd Level)
  - Winners (2): 1962–63, 1977–78
- Third Division (4th Level)
  - Winners (1): 1993–94
- Women's League
  - Winners (1): 1996-97
- Women's Futsal League
  - Winners (2): 2023-24, 2024-25

=== Cup ===
- Second/Third Division Knock Out Cup
  - Winners (1): 1994–95
- Third Division Sons of Malta Cup
  - Winners (1): 1978–79
- David Cluett Memorial Cup (Lija Veterans)
  - Winners (1): 2026-27

=== Individual Awards ===
- Best 1st Division Player
  - Erjon Beu (2): 2012-13, 2019-20
  - Simon Agius (1): 2000-01
  - Ridha Dardouri (1): 1995-96
- Best 2nd Division Player
  - John Cuschieri (1): 1978-79
- Premier League Player of the Month
  - Simon Agius (1): November 2001
- Women's Player of the Month (Raiders Lija)
  - Monique Sultana (1): December 2021
  - Anna Aloisio (1): May 2022
- Women’s Youth League Player of the Month (Raiders Lija)
  - Lexine Farrugia (1): September/October 2022
  - Sarah Vella Barberi (1): November 2022

== Youth Academy ==
The Lija Iklin Youth Academy alongside the Iklin Local Council and the 'Skema Żgħażagħ Iklin', was founded back in 2002 by then president Mr Charles J.Scerri.

During the years the academy has been recognized as one of central Malta's leading football academy's with over 250 players registered. The academy includes teams in each age category, catering for boys and girls.

New Logo used from 2025 onwards First logo used between 2002 and 2025

Committee (2026-27)
Position	Name
Chairman	(Malta) Dr. Dorian Sciberras
Secretary	(Malta) Antoine Vella
Treasurer	(Malta) Allen Debono
Members	(Malta) Mario Fenech (Malta) Lara Camilleri

As of 16 November 2026

Season 2026–27
Category	Section	Pos	P	W	D	L	PTS
Under 15	B	10th	6	0	0	6	0
Under 17	C	3rd	6	3	1	2	10

== Women's Teams ==
Lija Athletic Women's Team proudly participated in the very first women's football league organized in Malta during the 1995/96 season, making their mark by winning the league the following year in 1996/97. Over the years, the team took part in several seasons, but it was from the 2021/22 season onwards that Lija Women's returned as a consistent presence in the local football scene. Since then, steady improvement has been evident across all levels. Today, Lija Athletic actively competes in all women's football categories in Malta, including the Under-16, Youth, and Senior leagues.

As from the 2026/27 season, only the Under 16's team will be competing, under the new name Lija Żabbar.

As of 16 November 2026

Season 2026–27
Category	Section	Pos	P	W	D	L	PTS
Under 16	N/A	4th	5	3	0	2	9

== Veterans ==
Towards the end of the 2025–26 season, it was announced that Lija would participate in the 2026–27 Malta Veterans League under the name Lija Veterans. In their debut season, the team won the David Cluett Memorial Cup after defeating Valletta Veterans 3–2 in a memorable final.

As of 19 November 2026

Lija Veterans Logo

Season 2026–27
League	Pos	P	W	D	L	PTS
Veteran's League	1st	1	1	0	0	3

2026 David Cluett Memorial Cup
Round	Team A	Score	Team B
F	Lija Veterans	3-2	Valletta Veterans
SF	Floriana Veterans	2-2 (2-4)	Lija Veterans
MD4	Rabat	0-3	Lija Veterans
MD3	Gzira United	1-2	Lija Veterans
MD2	Lija Veterans	4-8	Floriana Veterans
MD1	Valletta Veterans	5-3	Lija Veterans

== Futsal ==
Lija Athletic Futsal origins back to 2007 when Naxxar Motors Futsal Club entered the Maltese futsal league system. After finishing runners-up of the Second Division in their debut season, the club earned promotion to the First Division.

In 2012, Naxxar Motors amalgamated with Lija Athletic and became Lija Athletic Futsal Club, with Brian Spiteri appointed as Coach. The final season during that period was in 2015/16 in which Lija finished fourth and reached the league play-off semi-finals.

In June 2026, it was announced that a former Futsal team will now compete as Lija Athletic Futsal for the 2026-27 Enemed Futsal Challenge League.

As of 14 July 2026

Season 2026–27
League	Pos	P	W	D	L	PTS
Futsal Challenge League	1st	0	0	0	0	0

== Competitions history ==
=== 2000–present ===
Season	League									Top scorer		Knockout/Cup	Youths U/19		
Season	Div.	Pos.	Pl.	W	D	L	GS	GA	P	Name	Goals	Knockout/Cup	Div.	Pos.	Cup
2000–2001	2nd	2nd	18	10	4	4	36	20	34	(Malta) Alan Tabone	9	First Round	Section B	9th	First Round
2001–2002	1st	10th	24	4	3	17	21	70	11	(Albania) Ilir Pelinku	6	Second Round	Section B	7th	Quarter-Finals
2002–2003	2nd	5th	18	6	6	6	21	24	24	(Malta) Glenn Barry	10	First round	Section B	4th	Winners
2003–2004	2nd	2nd	18	9	5	4	31	24	32	(Malta) Glenn Barry	7	Second round	Section B	9th	Preliminary Round
2004–2005	1st	10th	24	3	2	19	13	60	11	(Malta) Glenn Barry	5	First round	Section C	2nd	Preliminary Round
2005–2006	2nd	9th	18	5	3	10	20	33	18	(Malta) Michael Gatt	5	First round	Section B	6th	Second round
2006–2007	3rd	7th	22	8	6	8	27	25	30	(Malta) Anthony Gera	8	Quarter-Finals	Section B	2nd	Winners
2007–2008	3rd	6th	22	8	4	10	25	29	28	(Malta) Beppe Antignolo	6	First Round	Section A	8th	Preliminary Round
2008–2009	3rd	3rd	22	15	3	4	35	17	48	(Malta) Chris Pace	8	First Round	Section A	10th	Quarter Finals
2009–2010	3rd	1st	22	14	6	2	48	22	48	(Malta) Antoine Sacco	10	Quarter-Finals	Section B	10th	Preliminary Round
2010–2011	2nd	5th	18	7	3	8	24	25	24	(Bosnia and Herzegovina) Admir Džanović	7	First Round	Section C	8th	Preliminary Round
2011–2012	2nd	7th	22	8	5	9	26	25	29	(Malta) Gilbert Camilleri	6	Fourth Round	Section C	8th	First Round
2012–2013	2nd	4th	22	13	3	6	42	30	42	(Albania) Erjon Beu	12	Semi-Finals	Section C	9th	First Round
2013–2014	2nd	7th	24	9	6	9	44	44	33	(Bulgaria) Kiril Aleksandrov	15	Third Round	Section C	10th	Third Round
2014–2015	2nd	9th	26	12	2	12	45	43	38	(Nigeria) Ige Abdullahi Adeshina	10	Third Round	Section D	1st	Second Round
2015–2016	2nd	5th	26	12	5	9	40	27	41	(Albania) Erjon Beu	9	Fourth Round	Section C	2nd	Third Round
2016–2017	2nd	1st	26	16	6	4	63	34	54	(Albania) Erjon Beu	24	Fourth Round	Section B	2nd	Third Round
2017–2018	1st	14th	26	1	3	22	23	84	6	(Albania) Erjon Beu	11	Quarter-Finals	Section A	8th	Second Round
2018–2019	2nd	7th	26	9	8	9	49	50	35	(Albania) Erjon Beu	20	Fourth Round	Section A	10th	Second Round
2019–2020	2nd	2nd	19	11	3	5	47	31	36	(Albania) Erjon Beu	25	Third Round	Section B	2nd	Second Round
2020–2021	1st	15th	23	5	5	13	25	46	20	(Albania) Erjon Beu	9	Round of 32	Section A*	12th	N/A
2021–2022	2nd	7th	20	8	4	8	39	37	28	(Malta) Lydon Micallef	18	Preliminary Round	Section A	12th	N/A
2022–2023	2nd	10th	28	11	6	11	51	54	39	(Colombia) Duvan Mosqueira Torres	16	Preliminary Round	Section B	7th	N/A
2023–2024	2nd	9th	24	9	5	10	31	44	32	(Albania) Erjon Beu	10	Round of 32	Section B	7th	N/A
2024–2025	2nd	15th	22	5	4	13	25	38	19	(Malta) Erjon Beu	8	Round of 32	Section B	7th	N/A
2025–2026	3rd	4th	26	15	4	7	48	35	49	(Scotland) Ross McParland (France) Lyvann Obissa	9	Didn't Qualify	Section B	11th	N/A

*Due to the Covid-19 Pandemic no relegations/promotions were done for the 2020/21 BOV Youth League Section A
