= 2011–12 Maltese Premier League =

97th season of the Maltese Premier League

Maltese Premier League
- Season: 2011–12
- Champions: Valletta (21st title)
- Relegated: Marsaxlokk; Mqabba
- Champions League: Valletta
- Europa League: Hibernians; Birkirkara; Floriana
- Matches: 126
- Goals: 384 (3.05 per match)
- Top goalscorer: Obinna Obiefule (34 goals)
- Biggest home win: Hibernians 5–0 Birkirkara
- Biggest away win: Hamrun Spartans 0–4 Birkirkara
- Highest scoring: Marsaxlokk 5–3 Hamrun Spartans

The 2011–12 Maltese Premier League was the 97th season of the Maltese Premier League, the top-tier football league in Malta. It began on 19 August 2011 and it ended in May 2012. Valletta were the defending champions, having won their 20th title last season.

The Premier League consists of two rounds. In the First Round, every team plays each opponent twice, once "home" and once "away" (in actuality, the designation of home and away is purely arbitrary as most of the clubs do not have their own grounds), for a total of 22 games. The league then splits into two pools. Earned points are subsequently halved. Teams that finish in positions 1–6 compete in the "Top Six" and teams that finish in positions 7–12 play in the "Play-Out".

On 13 January 2011, the Malta Football Association decided to expand the league to 12 teams starting with this season.

== Teams ==
Vittoriosa Stars were relegated to the First Division after finishing in last place of the Play-Out last season. This ended a one-year stay in the Premier League for them. Taking their place in the competition are Balzan, the champions of the Maltese First Division. Balzan are playing in the Premier League after a seven season absence.

Because of the league's expansion for this season, the second- and third-place finishers of the First Division, Mqabba and Mosta respectively, were also promoted to the Premier League for this season. Mqabba return to the top league after a three year absence while Mosta return after five years away.

== Venues ==
2011–12 Maltese Premier League is located in Malta	Ta' Qali	Ta' Qali	Paola	Hamrun
2011–12 Maltese Premier League is located in Malta	Ta' Qali National Stadium	Centenary Stadium	Tony Bezzina Stadium	Victor Tedesco Stadium
2011–12 Maltese Premier League is located in Malta	Capacity: 16,997	Capacity: 3,000	Capacity: 2,968	Capacity: 1,962

=== Stadia and training grounds ===
Only a few stadia have the infrastructure needed to host Premier League matches. These are Ta' Qali National Stadium and Centenary Stadium at Ta' Qali, Attard, Victor Tedesco Stadium at Ħamrun and Hibernians Ground at Paola. Additional to that, each team has been assigned to a dedicated training ground. On a few occasions, Hibernians and Hamrun Spartans play at their home ground, but otherwise all games are played on neutral ground, rendering "home" and "away" games purely symbolic.

Location of teams in 2011–12 Maltese Premier Division

Team	Location of origin	Ground	Location of ground
Balzan	Balzan		
Birkirkara	Birkirkara	Infetti Ground	Birkirkara
Floriana	Floriana	Victor Tedesco Stadium	Ħamrun
Hibernians	Paola	Hibernians Ground	Paola
Hamrun Spartans	Ħamrun	Victor Tedesco Stadium	Ħamrun
Marsaxlokk	Marsaxlokk	Marsaxlokk Ground	Marsaxlokk
Mosta	Mosta	Mosta Ground	Mosta
Mqabba	Mqabba		
Qormi	Qormi	Thomaso Grounds	Qormi
Sliema Wanderers	Sliema	Tigné Point	Sliema
Tarxien Rainbows	Tarxien	Tarxien Ground	Tarxien
Valletta	Valletta	Salinos Ground	Valletta

== First phase ==
=== League table ===
Pos	Team	Pld	W	D	L	GF	GA	GD	Pts	Qualification
1	Valletta	22	17	4	1	52	17	+35	55	Qualification for the Top Six
2	Hibernians	22	15	6	1	55	16	+39	51	Qualification for the Top Six
3	Floriana	22	12	6	4	34	19	+15	42	Qualification for the Top Six
4	Sliema Wanderers	22	8	11	3	34	24	+10	35	Qualification for the Top Six
5	Birkirkara	22	11	2	9	34	29	+5	35	Qualification for the Top Six
6	Balzan	22	9	4	9	28	34	−6	31	Qualification for the Top Six
7	Qormi	22	9	2	11	36	37	−1	29	Qualification for the Play-Out
8	Mosta	22	6	5	11	23	35	−12	23	Qualification for the Play-Out
9	Mqabba	22	5	5	12	25	43	−18	20	Qualification for the Play-Out
10	Hamrun Spartans	22	5	4	13	31	52	−21	19	Qualification for the Play-Out
11	Tarxien Rainbows	22	5	3	14	26	44	−18	18	Qualification for the Play-Out
12	Marsaxlokk	22	3	2	17	25	53	−28	11	Qualification for the Play-Out

Source: MFA, Soccerway
Rules for classification: 1) Points; 2) Play-offs (only if needed to decide champions, teams for relegation or teams for UEFA competitions).

=== Results ===
Home \ Away	BAL	BIR	FLO	HIB	HAM	MRS	MOS	MQA	QOR	SLI	TAR	VAL
Balzan	—	0–4	2–2	3–2	2–0 (Note: This match originally ended 1-3 for Hamrun Spartans, but was awarded to Balzan 2-0 following an appeal.)	3–1	1–1	1–2	2–0	2–1	1–0	0–2
Birkirkara	2–1	—	0–1	0–3	3–1	1–0	0–0	1–0	2–0	0–1	2–3	1–4
Floriana	3–1	0–3	—	0–0	4–2	4–0	1–2	2–0	2–1	0–1	1–0	0–1
Hibernians	3–1	5–0	1–1	—	5–0	2–1	2–1	4–1	4–0	1–1	2–0	1–1
Hamrun Spartans	1–2	0–4	0–1	1–1	—	6–2	2–2	0–2	2–3	4–2	3–1	0–2
Marsaxlokk	0–1	1–2	0–4	0–2	5–3	—	5–2	0–2	1–2	0–2	2–2	0–2
Mosta	1–0	1–3	2–3	0–2	0–1	0–0	—	3–0	1–0	3–2	2–1	0–3
Mqabba	2–2	2–2	0–1	1–6	2–3	1–0	1–1	—	1–4	0–2	1–1	2–4
Qormi	3–0	2–0	1–1	0–2	3–0	3–1	4–1	0–1	—	1–3	4–1	1–4
Sliema Wanderers	1–1	1–0	0–0	3–3	1–1	2–2	2–0	1–1	3–3	—	3–0	0–0
Tarxien Rainbows	1–2	1–3	1–2	1–2	1–1	2–4	1–0	3–2	2–0	1–1	—	1–4
Valletta	2–0	2–1	1–1	0–2	4–0	5–2	1–0	2–1	3–1	1–1	4–2	—

Source: MFA
Legend: Blue = home team win; Yellow = draw; Red = away team win.

== Second phase ==
=== Top Six ===
Pos	Team	Pld	W	D	L	GF	GA	GD	Pts	Qualification	VAL	HIB	BIR	FLO	SLI	BAL
1	Valletta (C)	32	25	5	2	75	24	+51	54	Qualification for the 2012–13 UEFA Champions League	—	1–2	1–1	2–0	3–0	1–0
2	Hibernians	32	22	6	4	74	26	+48	46	Qualification for the 2012–13 UEFA Europa League (Note: The winners of the 2011–12 Maltese FA Trophy, Hibernians, qualified for the 2012–13 UEFA Europa League. As they finished second, the fourth-placed team of the league also qualified for the Europa League.)	2–3	—	0–1	1–0	2–1	3–0
3	Birkirkara	32	17	4	11	55	37	+18	38	Qualification for the 2012–13 UEFA Europa League	0–2	2–0	—	3–1	1–1	3–0
4	Floriana	32	16	6	10	46	32	+14	29	Qualification for the 2012–13 UEFA Europa League	0–1	0–2	2–1	—	1–4	3–1
5	Sliema Wanderers	32	9	14	9	43	50	−7	23		0–2	1–3	1–4	1–3	—	1–1
6	Balzan	32	9	6	17	36	64	−28	15		2–7	1–4	0–5	0–3	3–3	—

Source: MFA, Soccerway
Legend: Blue = home team win; Yellow = draw; Red = away team win.
Rules for classification: 1) Points; 2) Play-offs (only if needed to decide champions, teams for relegation or teams for UEFA competitions).
(C) Champions

=== Play-Out ===
Pos	Team	Pld	W	D	L	GF	GA	GD	Pts	Relegation	QOR	MOS	TAR	HAM	MQA	MRS
7	Qormi	32	15	2	15	54	48	+6	33		—	1–4	1–0	6–0	2–1	5–1
8	Mosta	32	10	8	14	45	47	−2	27		2–0	—	0–2	2–2	2–2	5–0
9	Tarxien Rainbows	32	11	3	18	45	54	−9	27		1–2	2–1	—	1–2	1–0	2–4
10	Hamrun Spartans	32	9	7	16	47	71	−24	25		1–0	1–1	0–3	—	0–0	3–1
11	Mqabba (R)	32	9	7	16	40	55	−15	24	Relegation to the 2012–13 Maltese First Division	0–1	1–0	0–5	4–1	—	3–0
12	Marsaxlokk (Note: Marsaxlokk has 9 points deducted.) (R)	32	5	2	25	34	88	−54	8	Relegation to the 2012–13 Maltese First Division	1–0	1–5	0–2	1–6	0–4	—

Source: MFA, Soccerway
Legend: Blue = home team win; Yellow = draw; Red = away team win.
Rules for classification: 1) Points; 2) Play-offs (only if needed to decide champions, teams for relegation or teams for UEFA competitions).
(R) Relegated

== Top goalscorers ==
Rank	Player	Club	Goals
1	(Nigeria) Obinna Obiefule	Marsaxlokk / Mosta	34
2	(Brazil) Tarabai	Hibernians	21
3	(Malta) Clayton Failla	Hibernians	11
4	(Spain) Moises Avila Perez	Birkirkara	10
5	(Malta) Joseph Farrugia	Qormi	9
5	(Brazil) Denni	Valletta	9
5	(Nigeria) Alfred Effiong	Valletta	9
8	(Bulgaria) Danail Mitev	Sliema Wanderers	10
8	(Serbia) Bojan Mamić	Mqabba	8
10	(Brazil) Thiago Mazzitelli	Mqabba	7

== Attendances ==
The 2011-12 BOV Premier League clubs sorted by average home league attendance:

#	Club	Average
1	Valletta	2,502
2	Hibernians	1,738
3	Floriana	1,431
4	Hamrun Spartans	1,180
5	Marsaxlokk	510
6	Birkirkara	494
7	Qormi	494
8	Sliema Wanderers	489
9	Balzan	473
10	Mosta	367
11	Mqabba	321
12	Tarxien	298
Average per club		858
