= Senglea Athletic F.C. =

Maltese football club

Senglea Athletic
- Full name: Senglea Athletic Football Club
- Nicknames: L-Isla, Senglea, Yellows
- Founded: 22 March 1943; 83 years ago
- President: Neil Carter
- Manager: Rodney Bugeja
- League: Maltese National Amateur League
- 2024-25: Maltese Challenge League 15th (Relegated)
Home colours	Away colours	Third colours

Senglea Athletic Football Club is a professional Maltese football club based in Senglea. Founded in 1943, the club currently plays in the Maltese Challenge League.

== History ==
Senglea Athletic Football Club was founded in 1943. It took over from the former Senglea United club, which had been formed in 1921 following the demise of Senglea Shamrocks. After the Second World War the club began to compete in the Second Division (today's Third Division) organised by the Malta Football Association.

The most moments of glory and happiness occurred in the mid-70's when the club was promoted to the second division, and later on to the first division. For a number of successive times Senglea Athletic F.C. were declared champions of the second division.

For another time, in 1981, the club was promoted to the Maltese Premier Division. (Note: Prior to 1980, the top level of the Maltese Football League was known as the First Division, however it was renamed the Premier League and has stayed so since, with the First Division (formerly known as the Second Division) one level lower.) During that season, Senglea Athletic made history when they contested in the final of the MFA Trophy, while being in the Maltese First Division. The club was very near to participate in the European Cup Winners' Cup, but the final against Floriana F.C. ended in a 2–1 loss for Senglea Athletic F.C. During that time the president for the club was Walter Clinch.

From that time onwards Senglea Athletic F.C. passed through some very bad moments due to financial crisis. But then in the year 2000, they got back to their feet and were promoted from the Maltese Third Division to the Maltese Second Division, together with Msida F.C. During that time the president for Senglea Athletic F.C. was Reno Chirchop.

The next year, Senglea Athletic F.C., this time again with Msida F.C., were promoted to the Maltese First Division. During that time the president for Senglea Athletic F.C. was Dr. Vincent S. Zammit. The club's aim of competing in the Maltese Premier League took a step backwards, when during the 2008–09 season they were relegated to the Maltese Second Division. During the season 2009–10 Senglea Athletic finished in the 9th place, just a position above the relegation play-offs.

== Kit ==
The home kit of Senglea Athletic F.C. consists of the primary colours of Senglea, yellow and red. The manufacturer of the kits is Givova, while the main sponsors - COMMERCIAL PARTNERS Palumbo Malta Shipyards - Internships Worldwide - Universal Cement - UC Ltd. American University of Malta - EFES Pilsener Malta - Le Regatta

== Current squad ==
=== Senior Squad ===
Note: The same squad number may be used by more than one player. If that is the case, the last player who have used the number is assigned with it.
Note: Flags indicate national team as defined under FIFA eligibility rules; some limited exceptions apply. Players may hold more than one non-FIFA nationality.

No.	Pos.	Nation	Player
1	GK	MLT	Glen Zammit
2	DF	MLT	Irvin Abela
3	DF	MLT	Amir Ahmamed
5	DF	GHA	Edmund Gbordzor
6	MF	MLT	Tyrone Fenech
7	FW	MLT	Daneel Abela
8	FW	MLT	Terence Vella
10	MF	MLT	Llywelyn Cremona
11	MF	MLT	Clive Gauci
9	FW	GHA	Alilu Issaka
16	MF	MLT	Karl Magri
3	DF	MLT	Owen Galea

No.	Pos.	Nation	Player
17	MF	MLT	Xylon Marmara
18	DF	MLT	Keith Vella
19	DF	MLT	Jake Borg
20	MF	COL	Esquiel Sebastian Perdomo
23	MF	MLT	Brandon Micallef
22	FW	MLT	Salem El Kayati
28	MF	MLT	Kane Bonello
29	GK	MLT	Luke Cocker
30	DF	MLT	Steve Meilak
48	FW	MLT	Kenneth Abela
93	DF	MLT	Christian Grech

During the 2007/08 season Senglea were crowned champions of Section D of the MFA Youth League, and thus they were promoted to Section C.

The following season also proved to be successful to Senglea. Apart from finishing 4th in Section C, taking into consideration that this was their first season in this level, they also managed to reach the semi-final of the Youth Knock-Out B, where clubs from Sections B, C and D take part. In the semi final they lost 5–1 to the Section B club, Qormi.

During the season 2011-12 Senglea were crowned champions of Section C, and therefore gaining promotion to Section B. They also managed to reach the semi-final of the knock-out once again. They were eliminated by the designated champions Balzan Youths.

== Statistics ==
Year	Division	Level	Position (Participating Teams)	Points Gained / Maximum Points
1997/98	(Malta) Maltese Third Division Section B	4	3rd (7)	/
1998/99	(Malta) Maltese Third Division Section B	4	4th (7)	/
1999/00	(Malta) Maltese Third Division	4	10th (15)	/
2000/01	(Malta) Maltese Third Division	4	2nd (16)	/
2001/02	(Malta) Maltese Second Division	3	2nd (12)	/
2002/03	(Malta) Maltese First Division	2	3rd (10)	/
2003/04	(Malta) Maltese First Division	2	4th (10)	/
2004/05	(Malta) Maltese First Division	2	4th (10)	28 / 54
2005/06	(Malta) Maltese First Division	2	5th (10)	27 / 54
2006/07	(Malta) Maltese First Division	2	5th (10)	27 / 54
2007/08	(Malta) Maltese First Division	2	4th (10)	31 / 54
2008/09	(Malta) Maltese First Division	2	10th (10)	8 / 54
2009/10	(Malta) Maltese Second Division	3	9th (12)	25 / 66
2010/11	(Malta) Maltese Second Division	3	10th (12)	19 / 66
2011/12	(Malta) Maltese Second Division	3	13th (14)	15 / 78
2012/13	(Malta) Maltese Third Division	4	1st (14)	68 / 78

== Honours ==
=== Club ===
- Maltese First Division (Level 2)
  - Champions : 1974/75, 1980/81
- Maltese Second Division (Level 3)
  - Runners-Up : 2001/02
- Maltese Third Division (Level 4)
  - Champions : 2012/13
- F.A. Trophy
  - Runners-Up : 1980/81
- Youths / Minors (Under-19)
  - Section C
    - Champions : 1960/61, 1967/68, 2011/12
  - Section D
    - Champions : 2007/08
  - Youth Knock-Out
    - Semi-Final : 2008/09, 2009/10
  - Youth Knock-Out B
    - Semi-Final : 2011/12

=== Individual ===
- Maltese First Division (Level 2)
  - Best Player
    - Winner : George Attard (2005/06)
    - Runner-Up : Elvin Attard (2002/03)
    - Nominee : Anthony Ewurum (2007/08)
  - Top-Scorer
    - Runner-Up : Anthony Ewurum (2007/08)
- Maltese Third Division (Level 4)
  - Best Player
    - Winner : Gatt Victor (2000/01)
  - Top-Scorer
    - Winner : Gatt Victor (2000/01)

== Gallery ==
Senglea Athletic Football Club

Senglea Athletic Football Club Badge

Senglea Athletic Football Club Youth Nursery Badge
