= Gozo F.C. =

- Full name: Gozo Football Club
- Nicknames: Tat-Tlett Gholjiet; L-Għawdxin
- Founded: 1987
- Dissolved: 2011
- Ground: Gozo Stadium
- Capacity: 1,644
Home colours	Away colours

Gozo Football Club was a Maltese football club based on the island of Gozo. Gozo FC was founded in 1987. The club was disbanded following the end of the 2010–2011 season.

Gozo FC was run by the Gozo Football Association. It represented the island of Gozo in the Maltese Leagues. Its squad was formed of Gozitan players who played their trade in the Gozitan Leagues, mainly in the First Division. Their home matches were held at the Gozo Stadium.

== History ==
=== Early history ===
Gozo FC spent most of its first years in the Maltese Second Division and Third Division. Their first honour was the 1995-96 Maltese Second and Third Division Knock-Out, when Gozo FC ran out 5–2 winners against Għaxaq in a match played at the National Stadium.

Gozo FC won Section B of the Second Division, the third tier of the Maltese League system, for the 1997–98 season. The following season (1998–99), they participated in the First Division and unexpectedly topped the table level with Zurrieq F.C. on 35 points. However, having a better goal difference, Zurrieq won the title. Gozo FC drew praise nonetheless, having gone from the Maltese Second Division to the Maltese Premier League in just two years.

=== 1999-2000 season ===
The 1999–2000 season is considered the high water mark in the short history of Gozo FC. Not only did they compete with the elite for the first time in their history, but they made it to the quarter-finals of the Maltese Cup for the first and only time by beating Lija Athletic 4–2 in Gozo in the second round. They drew against Maltese powerhouse Sliema Wanderers, and even though their tie was played at home, they could not match up to their more illustrious opponents and suffered a 6–1 defeat.

Their performance in the Maltese Premier League was a good one overall, despite it lasting only one season. The first round was a very positive one for Gozo. When the division was split into two, Gozo FC occupied eighth position with 14 points from 18 outings. Given they were considered the hot favourites for relegation, their performances were above expectations and they never suffered a humiliating defeat. The biggest defeat was a 5–1 defeat suffered in the hands of Floriana. While from 9 away fixtures they only collected five points, a win against Pieta Hotspurs and two draws with Naxxar Lions and Zurrieq respectively, at home they proved to be a difficult bone to crack down.

A 1-0 historic victory over leaders and eventual champions Birkirkara was the highlight of the campaign. This is considered the most prestigious victory in the whole history of Gozo FC. Other results achieved include the 1–1 draw against Hibernians, followed by wins against Zurrieq and draws against Rabat Ajax and Pieta Hotspurs respectively. Gozo FC was also defeated by current champions Valletta (2–0 at home and 1–0 at Ta' Qali) and Sliema Wanderers (2–1 at home).

The second round proved not to be as positive as the first round. A single win and 3 draws from 6 outings weren't enough and in the end Gozo FC were relegated to the Maltese First Division after a solitary season in the Maltese Premier League. In the whole season Gozo FC scored a total of 22 goals and conceded only 39, the fourth best defence in the premier division.

During the season, Gozo F.C.'s player Djibril Sylla also debuted for Malta, becoming the first and only player ever to play for Malta whilst playing for Gozo.

=== Decline ===
The relegation to the First Division proved to be the start of the decline of the Gozitans. In the season 2000/2001 they ended in the seventh position. The following season saw little improvement and again finished in the seventh position. In the season 2002/2003 Gozo FC got relegated to the Second Division when they finished in the 9th place with 17 points. However they returned to the First division on the first time of asking after beating Gzira United in the promotion playoff. Their adventure in the First division lasted only one season and they were relegated again to the Second Division. Gozo FC finished bottom with a single win and 4 draws from 18 outings.

In the 2005/2006 Gozo FC showed some good performances and they ended their campaign in a comfortable sixth position. The following season Gozo FC were relegated to the lowest tier of the Maltese League, the Maltese Third Division when they finished bottom with 11 points. For the 2007/2008 Gozo FC were drawn in the Section B. This time, Gozo FC were in class of their own and proved too strong for their opponents and topped the Third Division Section B. From 16 outings they recorded 15 wins and 1 draw, coming against Kalkara totaling to 46 points from a possible 48. They scored 40 goals and let in only 14 goals. This entitled them for a promotion play-off against Żebbuġ Rangers which won their respective division that is Section A.

While Gozo FC were winning 3-1 and were dominating the match, in the 57th minute the match was abandoned. This happened because the assistant referee was hit by an object in his head and the referee had no other option but to abandon the match. Of course, the Gozitans were disappointed to see this happen because they were waiting for the moment to lift the cup from September but now they had to wait for the decision to be taken by the MFA about the final result of the match. Given that Gozo FC had nothing to do with those actions they were handed the cup and as well promoted to the Second Division. Former Valletta striker Chris Camilleri finished runner-up in the scoring charts. The club folded three years later.

== Achievements ==
- Maltese First Division: 1
  - 1998–99
- Maltese Second Division: 1
  - 1997–98
- Maltese Third Division: 1
  - 2007–08
- Maltese Second and Third Division Knock-Out
  - 1995–96

== Gozo Women ==
Gozo Women was a team which used to play in the Maltese Women's League. Gozo Women participated in the first two seasons, namely 1995/96 and 1996/97, and thereafter - and bar for a one-year hiatus during the 2014/15 season, between 2009/10 and until their disbandment following the conclusion of the 2016/17 season.

During their existence, Gozo Women won the Maltese Second Division twice, namely during the 2009/10 season and 2015/16 season.
