= Dingli Swallows F.C. =

Dingli Swallows
- Full name: Dingli Swallows Football Club
- Nickname: The Swallows
- Founded: 1948; 78 years ago
- Ground: Tartarni Ground
- Capacity: 500
- Chairman: Joseph Cuschieri
- Head Coach: Valentina Micalef
- League: National Amateur League
- 2021–22: National Amateur League, Group A, 10th
Home colours

Dingli Swallows Football Club is a Maltese football club from the small village of Ħad-Dingli, which currently plays in the Maltese National Amateur League. The club was founded in 1948.

== History ==
In the 2008–09 season the club won the Maltese First Division, gaining promotion to Maltese Premier League for the first time ever. In their first season, they finished bottom of the league and were relegated back down.

== Current squad ==
Note: Flags indicate national team as defined under FIFA eligibility rules; some limited exceptions apply. Players may hold more than one non-FIFA nationality.

No.	Pos.	Nation	Player
—	GK	MLT	Emanuele Galea
—	GK	MLT	Kyle Zammit
—	DF	MLT	Andre Attard
—	DF	MLT	Karl Cilia
—	DF	MLT	Gianluca Theuma
—	DF	MLT	Denzil Briffa
—	DF	MLT	Ettiene Farrugia
—	DF	MLT	Richard Deschrijver (Club prod.)
—	DF	MLT	Guiseppe Versace (Club prod.)
—	MF	MLT	Dale Valletta
—	MF	MLT	Jonathan Pace (Club prod.)
—	MF	MLT	Matthew Borg (Club prod.)
—	MF	MLT	Dario Borg (Club prod.)
—	MF	MLT	Melchior Tonna
—	MF	MLT	Adrian Lanzon
—	MF	MLT	Andrew Scerri
—	MF	MLT	Robert Ciantar (Club Captain)
—	FW	MLT	Daniel Cilia
—	FW	ROU	Alin-Ion Margarit
—	FW	MLT	Luke Galea (Club prod.)

== Club officials and coaching staff ==
=== Club officials ===
- President: Joseph Cuschieri
- Vice President: Shawn Tanti
- Secretary: Brendan Tanti
- Treasurer: Rigovert Casha

== Honours ==
- Maltese First Division: 2008–09
