= Maltese Challenge League =

Association football league in Malta

- Founded: 2019
- Country: Malta
- Number of clubs: 16
- Level on pyramid: 2
- Promotion to: Maltese Premier League
- Relegation to: National League
- Domestic cup(s): Maltese FA Trophy; Challenge Cup
- Current champions: Balzan (2nd title) (2025–26)
- Current: 2026–27

The Maltese Challenge League (referred to as the BOV Challenge League for sponsorship reasons) is the second-highest division in Maltese football, behind the Maltese Premier League. The First Division was the precursor of the present Premier League until the latter was revamped for the 1980–81 season with the Maltese Challenge League instituted for the 2020–21 season following the premature end of the previous season due to the COVID-19 pandemic.

== Format ==
Since the 2022–23 season, the league is made up of eighteen teams. Over the course of the season, each team plays twice against the others in the league, resulting in each team completing thirty-four games in total. Three points are awarded for a win, one for a draw, and zero for a loss. The teams are ranked in the table by:

1. Total points gained

In the need of a tie-breaker, a play-off game is played. At the end of the season, the top two teams are directly promoted to the Premier League; an additional place is reserved for the winner of the relegation play-off between the twelfth-placed Premier League team and the third-placed Maltese Challenge League side. The four lowest-finishing teams are relegated to the National Amateur League.

== Venues ==
Maltese Challenge League is located in Malta	Ta' Qali	Hamrun
Maltese Challenge League is located in Malta	Centenary Stadium	Victor Tedesco Stadium
Maltese Challenge League is located in Malta	Capacity: 3,000	Capacity: 1,962

== Results ==
Year	Champions	Runner-up	Third place (Promotion)	Relegated
1996–97	Xgħajra Tornados	Tarxien Rainbows		Santa Luċija, Għaxaq
1997–98	Rabat Ajax	Żabbar St. Patrick		St. George's, Dingli Swallows
1998–99	Gozo	Żurrieq		Mellieħa, Siggiewi
1999–00	Ħamrun Spartans	Xgħajra Tornados		Gżira United, Żebbuġ Rangers
2000–01	Marsa	Lija Athletic		Tarxien Rainbows, Żurrieq
2001–02	Marsaxlokk	Mosta		Qormi, St. Andrews
2002–03	Msida St. Joseph	Balzan		Gozo, Xgħajra Tornados
2003–04	Żabbar St. Patrick	Lija Athletic		Tarxien Rainbows, Rabat Ajax
2004–05	Ħamrun Spartans	Mosta		Balzan, Gozo
2005–06	St. George's	Marsa		Lija Athletic, St. Andrews
2006–07	Ħamrun Spartans	Mqabba		San Ġwann, Naxxar Lions
2007–08	Tarxien Rainbows	Qormi		Mellieħa, Marsa
2008–09	Dingli Swallows	Vittoriosa Stars (No Promotion)		Rabat Ajax, Senglea Athletic
2009–10	Marsaxlokk	Vittoriosa Stars		Żabbar St. Patrick, San Ġwann
2010–11	Balzan	Mqabba	Mosta	Pietà Hotspurs, Msida St. Joseph
2011–12	Melita	Rabat Ajax		Żabbar St. Patrick, St. George's
2012–13	Naxxar Lions	Vittoriosa Stars		Dingli Swallows, Mqabba
2013–14	Pietà Hotspurs	Żebbuġ Rangers		Ħamrun Spartans, Żejtun Corinthians
2014–15	Pembroke Athleta	St. Andrews		Żurrieq, Msida St. Joseph, Birżebbuġa St. Peter's
2015–16	Gżira United	Ħamrun Spartans		Gudja United, St. George's, San Ġwann
2016–17	Lija Athetlic	Senglea Athletic	Naxxar Lions	Fgura United, Għargħur
2017–18	Qormi	Pietà Hotspurs		Żabbar St. Patrick, Melita, Rabat Ajax
2018–19	Sirens	Gudja United	Santa Luċija	Marsa, San Ġwann
2019–20	Zejtun Corinthians	Lija Athetlic		No Relegation
2020–21	No Promotion			Qormi
2021–22	Żebbuġ Rangers	Marsaxlokk (Group A Runner-up); Pietà Hotspurs (Group B Runner-up)		Senglea Athletic, Mgarr United, Luqa St. Andrew's, Pembroke Athleta, Rabat Ajax, St. George's,
2022–23	Sliema Wanderers	Naxxar Lions		Marsaskala, Mqabba, Mtarfa, Qrendi, San Gwann, Vittoriosa Stars
2023–24	Melita	Żabbar St. Patrick		Attard, Msida St. Joseph, Zejtun Corinthians, Luqa St. Andrew's
2024–25	Valletta	Tarxien Rainbows		Lija Athetlic, Senglea Athletic
2025–26	Balzan	Birżebbuġa St. Peter's		Marsa, Mtarfa
