= Gudja United F.C. =

Maltese football club

Gudja United
- Full name: Gudja United Football Club
- Nickname: The Blues
- Founded: 1945; 81 years ago
- Head Coach: Renzo Kerr-Cumbo
- League: Maltese Premier League
- 2022–23: MPL, 10th
- Website: http://gudjaunitedfc.com
| Home colours | Away colours |

Gudja United Football Club is a Maltese football club from the south-eastern village of Gudja, that currently plays in the Maltese Premier League.

The team play in blue and white striped jerseys. Their arch-rivals are Għaxaq F.C..

They have spent 5 seasons in the Premier league.

== Players ==
=== Current squad ===
As of 14 April, 2026

Note: Flags indicate national team as defined under FIFA eligibility rules; some limited exceptions apply. Players may hold more than one non-FIFA nationality.

| No. | Pos. | Nation | Player |
|---|---|---|---|
| 1 | GK | MLT | Glenn Zammit |
| 4 | DF | MLT | Nicholas Gauci |
| 5 | DF | ARG | Enzo Ruiz |
| 7 | MF | MLT | Brandon Muscat |
| 8 | MF | MLT | Jamie Cutajar |
| 10 | FW | NGA | Shola Shodiya |
| 11 | FW | MLT | German Paiber |
| 13 | MF | MLT | Andrea Mizzi |
| 19 | MF | MLT | Glending Farrugia |
| 21 | MF | MLT | Antiago De Flavia |

| No. | Pos. | Nation | Player |
|---|---|---|---|
| 23 | DF | MLT | Travis Bartolo |
| 24 | MF | SRB | Aleksa Zivkovic |
| 28 | FW | NGA | Tobi Akiti |
| 30 | DF | MLT | Eman Micallef |
| 30 | DF | MLT | Raul Formosa |
| 41 | GK | MLT | Yenz Cini |
| 77 | MF | MLT | Jamie Carbone |
| 90 | GK | MLT | Dwayne Camilleri |
| 92 | MF | MLT | Brady Agius |
| 99 | FW | NGA | Joseph Agbakwuru |

== Honours ==
- Maltese Challenge League (2): 2016, 2019
