= 2026–27 Maltese Premier League =

Maltese Premier League
- Season: 2026–27
- Dates: 17 August 2026 –
- Country: Malta
- Teams: 12
- Biggest home win: Birkirkara 4-0 Gżira United (17th August, 2026)
- Biggest away win: Gżira United 0-5 Marsaxlokk (2nd November, 2026)
- Highest scoring: Marsaxlokk 5-2 Floriana (12th September, 2026)
- Longest winning run: Mosta, Ħamrun Spartans and Sliema Wanderers (all 3 games)
- Longest unbeaten run: 11- Ħamrun Spartans (29th August 2026 -)
- Longest winless run: Birzebbuga (7 games)
- Longest losing run: Birzebbuga (6 games)

The 2026–27 Maltese Premier League (referred to as the VBet Malta Premier for sponsorship reasons) is the 112th season of top-flight league football in Malta. The season began on 17 August 2026. Floriana entered the season as the defending champions having won their 27th Premier League title in the previous season.

== Teams ==
Twelve teams are competing in the league: the top ten teams from the previous season and two teams promoted from the Challenge League.

=== Changes from the previous season ===
Promoted to the Premier League

- Birzebbuga
- Balzan

Relegated to the Challenge League

- Naxxar Lions
- Tarxien Rainbows

=== Locations ===
| Team | In league since | City | Last Season Position |
|---|---|---|---|
| Balzan | 2026 | Balzan | 1st in the BOV Challenge League |
| Birkirkara | 1990 | Birkirkara | 8th |
| Birżebbuġa St. Peter's | 2026 | Birżebbuġa | 2nd in the BOV Challenge League |
| Floriana | 1986 | Floriana | 1st, Defending Champions |
| Gżira United | 2016 | Gżira | 6th |
| Ħamrun Spartans | 2016 | Ħamrun | 3rd |
| Hibernians | 1945 | Paola | 7th |
| Marsaxlokk | 2022 | Marsaxlokk | 2nd |
| Mosta | 2011 | Mosta | 11th |
| Sliema Wanderers | 2023 | Sliema | 5th |
| Valletta | 2025 | Valletta | 4th |
| Żabbar St. Patrick | 2024 | Żabbar | 10th |

Location of teams in the 2026–27 Maltese Premier League

=== Personnel and kits ===
| Team | Manager | Kit manufacturer | Shirt sponsor (front) |
|---|---|---|---|
| Balzan | (Malta) Andrew Cohen | (Spain) Joma | Falcotrans |
| Birkirkara | (Malta) Paul Zammit | (Italy) Macron | McDonald's |
| Birżebbuġa St. Peter's | (Malta) Edgar Degabriele | (Germany) Erima | Montekristo Estate |
| Floriana | (Portugal) Daniel Portela | (Italy) Errea | |
| Gżira United | (Malta) Darren Abdilla | (Italy) Givova | Acomodel Sofa |
| Ħamrun Spartans | (Italy) Stefano Sanderra | (Spain) Joma | Mercury |
| Hibernians | (Turkey) Tuğberk Tanrıvermiş | (Spain) Joma | Bezzina |
| Marsaxlokk | (Italy) Enzo Potenza | (United States) Nike | Sports Direct |
| Mosta | (Malta) Joseph Grech | (Italy) Macron | Simply Clean |
| Sliema Wanderers | (Serbia) Branko Nišević | (Germany) Adidas | Betsson |
| Valletta | (Malta) Thane Micallef | (United States) Nike | Iniala |
| Żabbar St. Patrick | (Malta) Gilbert Agius | (Germany) Adidas | The Shoreline |

- Additionally, referee kits are made by Macron

== Venues ==
The matches are being played mainly at the Ta' Qali National Stadium and the Tony Bezzina Stadium. However, the Centenary Stadium, the Gozo Stadium and the Victor Tedesco Stadium are used for other matches.

| Ta' Qali | | 2026–27 Maltese Premier League is located in Malta |
|---|---|---|
| Ta' Qali National Stadium | Centenary Stadium | 2026–27 Maltese Premier League is located in Malta |
| Capacity: 16,997 | Capacity: 3,000 | 2026–27 Maltese Premier League is located in Malta |
| Paola | Ħamrun | Xewkija |
| Tony Bezzina Stadium | Victor Tedesco Stadium | Gozo Stadium |
| Capacity: 2,968 | Capacity: 1,962 | Capacity: 1,644 |

== Format ==
In the current format (since the 2024–25 season) the Maltese Premier League will be made up of 12 teams and be split into an Opening Round and Closing Round. In the Opening Round each of the 12 teams play each other once before the league is then split into a Top 6 and a Bottom 6, each team playing the neams in their split a further time. Points are reset and not carried forward to the Closing Round.

The league champions and the teams for UEFA competitions are determined as follow:

- If both the Opening Round and the Closing Round are won by the same team:
  - The winners of the Opening and the Closing Rounds are declared the league champions and qualify for the UEFA Champions League;
  - Second placed teams in the Opening Round and the Closing Round qualify for the UEFA Conference League;
  - If the same team finishes second in both the Opening and the Closing Rounds, a playoff match between third placed teams in the Opening Round and the Closing Round is played for the remaining spot in the UEFA Conference League;
- If the champions of the Opening Round are placed second in the Closing Round, and the champions of the Closing Round are placed second in the Opening Round:
  - A playoff match between the champions of the Opening and the Closing Round is played to determine the league champions;
  - A playoff match between third placed teams in the Opening Round and the Closing Round is played for the remaining spot in the UEFA Conference League;
- Otherwise, a Final Four tournament between winners and runners-up of the Opening and the Closing Rounds is played (if the same team finishes second in both the Opening and the Closing Rounds, the third placed team with the best aggregate points is included in the Final Four tournament), with the teams seeded based on the aggregate points.

=== Managerial changes ===
| Team | Outgoing head coach | Manner of departure | Date of vacancy | Table | Incoming head coach | Date of appointment |
|---|---|---|---|---|---|---|
| Birżebbuġa St. Peter's | (Malta) Edgar Degabriele | Resigned | 8 September 2026 | Round 4 | (Spain) Luciano Santana | 9 September 2026 |
| Ħamrun Spartans | (Italy) Marco Amelia | Fired | 13 November 2026 | | (Portugal) Daniel Portela | 16 November 2026 |

== Opening round ==
=== First phase ===
==== League table ====
| Pos | Team | Pld | W | D | L | GF | GA | GD | Pts | Qualification |
|---|---|---|---|---|---|---|---|---|---|---|
| 1 | Valletta | 11 | 8 | 1 | 2 | 23 | 9 | +14 | 25 | Qualification for the Top Six |
| 2 | Marsaxlokk | 11 | 6 | 2 | 3 | 21 | 14 | +7 | 20 | Qualification for the Top Six |
| 3 | Sliema Wanderers | 11 | 5 | 3 | 3 | 15 | 14 | +1 | 18 | Qualification for the Top Six |
| 4 | Ħamrun Spartans | 11 | 4 | 5 | 2 | 17 | 13 | +4 | 17 | Qualification for the Top Six |
| 5 | Floriana | 11 | 4 | 4 | 3 | 22 | 15 | +7 | 16 | Qualification for the Top Six |
| 6 | Hibernians | 11 | 4 | 4 | 3 | 13 | 15 | −2 | 16 | Qualification for the Top Six |
| 7 | Birkirkara | 11 | 4 | 3 | 4 | 14 | 11 | +3 | 15 | Qualification for the Play-Out |
| 8 | Żabbar St. Patrick | 11 | 4 | 2 | 5 | 17 | 16 | +1 | 14 | Qualification for the Play-Out |
| 9 | Mosta | 11 | 3 | 5 | 3 | 15 | 20 | −5 | 14 | Qualification for the Play-Out |
| 10 | Balzan | 11 | 2 | 5 | 4 | 13 | 14 | −1 | 11 | Qualification for the Play-Out |
| 11 | Birzebbuga St. Peter's | 11 | 1 | 3 | 7 | 9 | 21 | −12 | 6 | Qualification for the Play-Out |
| 12 | Gżira United | 11 | 0 | 5 | 6 | 9 | 26 | −17 | 5 | Qualification for the Play-Out |

Rules for classification: 1) Points; 2) Head-to-head points; 3) Head-to-head goal difference; 4) Head-to-head goals scored; 5) Goal difference; 6) Goals scored; 7) Play-offs (only if needed to decide champions, teams for relegation or teams for UEFA competitions).

== Season Statistics ==
=== Goalscorers ===
As of 22 October 2026

| Rank | Player | Club | Goals |
|---|---|---|---|
| 1 | (Malta) Andrea Zammit | Valletta | 6 |
| 2 | (Nigeria) Oluwatobiloba Dimeji Awosanya | Balzan | 5 |
| 2 | (Malta) Paul Mbong | Floriana | 5 |
| 2 | (Italy) Marcello Trotta | Ħamrun Spartans | 5 |
| 3 | (Argentina) Ulises Arias | Marsaxlokk | 4 |
| 3 | (Romania) Ionuț Cojocaru | Sliema Wanderers | 4 |
| 3 | (Italy) Mario Fontanella | Żabbar Saint Patricks | 4 |
| 3 | (Brazil) Giancarlo | Mosta | 4 |
| 4 | 6 players | from 4 teams | 3 |

- Own goal(s):
- (Bosnia and Herzegovina national football team) Stipe Tokic (Birżebbuġa for Birkirkara) (21 November 2026)

=== Goal of the Week ===
| Matchweek | Player | Club | Against |
|---|---|---|---|
| MW1 | (Brazil) Giancarlo Goncalves | Mosta | Hamrun Spartans |
| MW2 | (Denmark) Rasmus Linden | Marsaxlokk | Hibernians |
| MW3 | (Argentina) Ulises Jesús Arias | Marsaxlokk | Valletta |
| MW4 | (Brazil) Fernandinho | Birkirkara | Sliema |
| MW5 | (Argentina) Federico Varela | Floriana | Marsaxlokk |
| MW6 | (Argentina) Federico Varela | Floriana | Hibernians |
| MW7 | (Malta) Jayden Roe | Hibernians | Hamrun Spartans |

=== Hat-Tricks ===
| Player | Club | Against | Final Score | Time |
|---|---|---|---|---|
| (Brazil) Bruno Gomes | Valletta | Birżebbuġa St. Peter's | 3–0 | 4', 63', 65' |

=== Clean Sheets ===
| Rank | Player | Club | Clean Sheet |
|---|---|---|---|
| 1 | (Italy) Guilherme Cioletti Ferriera Da Silva | Floriana | 3 |
| 1 | (Brazil) Adilson Aguero Dos Santos | Valletta | 3 |

- Birkirkara as a team also kept 3 clean sheets bet they play two different goalkeepers over the period as Rashid Al-Tumi was sent off against Sliema Wanderers.

== Gallery ==
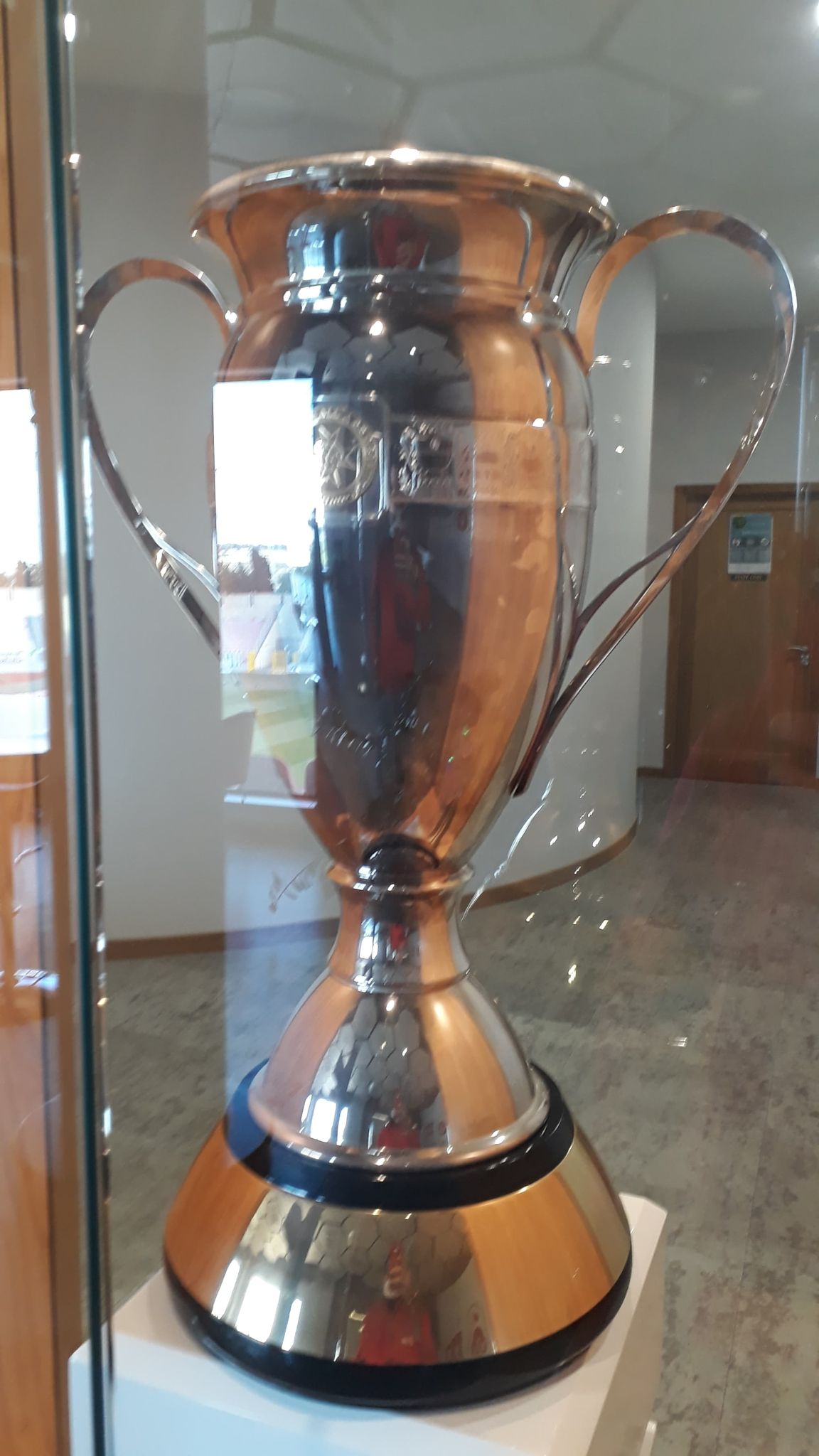
VBET Malta Premier League Trophy
