= 2024–25 Birżebbuġa St. Peter's F.C. season =

Maltese club's football season

Birżebbuġa St. Peter's
2024–25 season
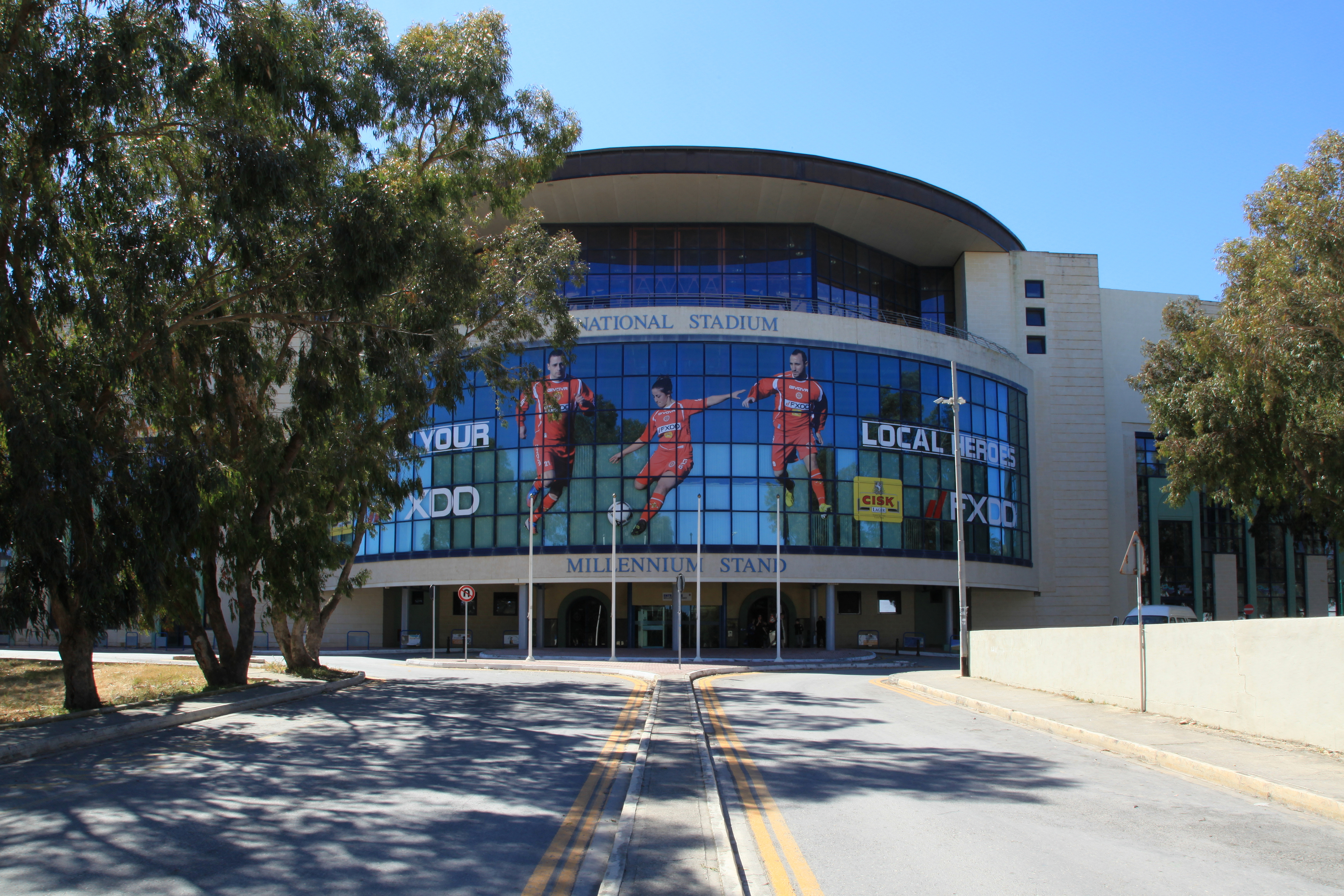
- Centenary Stadium
- Owner: Joseph Mangion
- Director: Joseph Mangion
- Manager: Edward Azzopardi (until 20 February 2025); Edgar Degabriele (interim, from 21 February 2025, until now)
- Stadium: Centenary Stadium
- Maltese Amateur League: 1st (Champion)
- Amateur Cup: Quarter-Finals
- Top goalscorer: League: Samuel Saldanha (15); All: Samuel Saldanha (15)
Home colours	Away colours

During the 2024–25 season, Birżebbuġa St. Peter's F.C. competed and won the Maltese National Amateur League.

== Season summary ==
On 9 August the club signed the Nigerian Yusuf Abdullahi. In February 2025, due to unsatisfactory results, Edward Azzopardi resigned as coach and was replaced by Edgar Degabriele.

In April 2025, the club won the Maltese National Amateur League for the first time in their history and were officially crowned champions of the Amateur League.

== Players ==
=== Squad information ===
As of 28 July 2026

Squad no.	Name	Nationality	Position	Date of birth (age)
Goalkeepers
1	Julian Azzopardi	(Malta)	GK	9 October 1987 (aged 36)
12	Isaac Abela	(Malta)	GK	22 May 2005 (aged 19)
22	Antonio Chetcuti	(Malta)	GK	21 August 1996 (aged 27)
22	Rudi Briffa	(Malta)	GK	14 February 1995 (aged 29)
Defenders
3	Carl Ciantar	(Malta)	DF	11 February 1996 (aged 28)
4	Emerson Galea	(Malta)	DF	31 July 2005 (aged 18)
4	Cedric Zahra	(Malta)	DF	20 October 1999 (aged 24)
4	Jurgen Farrugia	(Malta)	DF	19 September 1981 (aged 42)
6	Christopher Cutajar	(Malta)	DF	27 May 1993 (aged 31)
17	Clyde Cumbo	(Malta)	DF	20 January 2004 (aged 20)
17	Craig Joyce	(Malta)	DF	19 December 1996 (aged 27)
19	Ryan Sammut	(Malta)	DF	20 December 1997 (aged 26)
23	Thomas Mintoff	(Malta)	DF	18 May 2004 (aged 20)
Midfielders
2	Nathan Attard	(Malta)	MF	30 December 2001 (aged 22)
5	Joey Vella	(Malta)	MF	27 March 1995 (aged 29)
6	Brendan Scerri	(Malta)	MF	31 January 1998 (aged 26)
8	Christopher Mario Baker	(England)	MF	15 March 1990 (aged 34)
14	Fabrizio Zammit	(Malta)	MF	12 June 1999 (aged 25)
16	Randall Vella	(Malta)	MF	16 April 1992 (aged 32)
18	Lauro Attard	(Malta)	MF	22 July 2005 (aged 18)
20	Lian Sciberras	(Malta)	MF	12 September 2004 (aged 19)
66	Kyle Tanti	(Malta)	MF	28 March 2002 (aged 22)
	Jurgen Farrugia	(Malta)	MF	14 August 1991 (aged 32)
	Diego Christian Mifsud	(Malta)	MF	20 December 1998 (aged 25)
Forwards
10	Marquinho	(Brazil)	FW	24 February 1988 (aged 36)
11	Yusuf Sulaiman	(Nigeria)	FW	23 October 2001 (aged 22)
14	James Degabriele	(Malta)	FW	9 May 2001 (aged 25)
16	Kane Tippett	(Malta)	FW	9 May 2001 (aged 25)
20	Ronnie Celeste	(Malta)	FW	13 September 1986 (aged 39)
28	Gabriel Borg	(Malta)	FW	28 September 1999 (aged 24)
31	Lee Joe Schembri	(Malta)	FW	31 December 1986 (aged 37)
33	Dylan Micallef	(Malta)	FW	30 June 1994 (aged 30)
99	Samuel Saldanha	(Brazil)	FW	9 February 1996 (aged 28)
	Andrea Sant	(Malta)	FW	19 December 1997 (aged 26)

== Transfers ==
=== In ===
Date	Pos.	Player	Age	Moving from	Type	Fee	Source
Summer
1 August 2024	DF	(Nigeria) Craig Joyce	20	(Malta) Kirkop United	Transfer	Free	
9 August 2024	FW	(Nigeria) Yusuf Abdullahi	19	(Malta) Swieqi United	Transfer	Free	
9 August 2024	MF	(Malta) Lian Sciberras	19	(Malta) Żebbuġ Rangers	Transfer	Free	
Winter
1 January 2025	GK	(Malta) Isaac Abela	19	(Malta) Kalkara	Transfer	Free	

=== Out ===
Date	Pos.	Player	Age	Moving to	Type	Fee	Source
Summer
14 December 2026	DF	(Malta) Cedric Zahra	25	(Malta) Xgħajra Tornados	Transfer	Free	
Winter
1 January 2025	GK	(Malta) Antonio Chetcuti	28	(Malta) Kirkop United	Transfer	Free	

== Competitions ==
=== Overall record ===
Competition	First match	Last match	Final position	Record							
Competition	First match	Last match	Final position	Pld	W	D	L	GF	GA	GD	Win %
Maltese Amateur League	13 September 2025	14 February 2026	Winner	20	14	4	2	42	19	+23	70.00
National Amateur Cup	27 September 2024	24 December 2024	Quarter-Finals	3	2	0	1	8	3	+5	66.67
Total				23	16	4	3	50	22	+28	69.57

Last updated: 27 July 2026
Source: Results

==== Results summary ====
Overall								Home						Away					
Pld	W	D	L	GF	GA	GD	Pts	W	D	L	GF	GA	GD	W	D	L	GF	GA	GD
16	14	2	0	44	13	+31	44	8	1	0	22	7	+15	6	1	0	22	6	+16

Last updated: 5 August 2026.
Source: Results

==== Results by round ====
Round	1
Ground	
Result	
Position	

Updated to match(es) played on 21 May 2026. Source: Results
A = Away; H = Home; W = Win; D = Draw; L = Loss

=== National Amateur Cup (Malta) ===
7 December 2025	Nadur Youngsters (Gozo) (1)	1–4	Birżebbuġa St. Peter's (2)	Xewkija (Gozo)
14:00 CET	Rodriguez 61'; Gutierrez 73' (o.g.)		Vella 8'; Oliveira 32' (pen.); Agius 71'	Stadium: Gozo Stadium

4 January 2026	Balzan (2)	1–1 (a.e.t.) (3–5 p)	Birżebbuġa St. Peter's (2)	Ta' Qali
18:30 CET	Arab (red card) 90+7'; Awosanya 109'		De Souza (red card) 90+17'; Sulaiman 94'	Stadium: Centenary Stadium
	Penalties
	Santos (penalty missed); Awosanya (penalty scored); Ciappara (penalty scored); Engerer (penalty scored)		Lapira (penalty scored); Vella (penalty scored); Zerafa (penalty scored); Grioli (penalty scored); Sulaiman (penalty scored)

27 January 2026	Żurrieq (2)	3–0	Birżebbuġa St. Peter's (2)	Hamrun
20:45 CET	Monney 19', 25' (pen.); Zammit 78'			Stadium: Victor Tedesco Stadium

== Statistics ==
=== Appearances and goals ===
No.	Pos	Nat	Player	Total		Maltese Amateur League		Amateur Cup		Play-offs	
No.	Pos	Nat	Player	Apps	Goals	Apps	Goals	Apps	Goals	Apps	Goals
Goalkeepers
1	GK	(Malta) MLT	Julian Azzopardi	21	0	20	0	1	0	0	0
12	GK	(Malta) MLT	Isaac Abela	1	0	1	0	0	0	0	0
12	GK	(Malta) MLT	Antonio Chetcuti	5	0	3	0	2	0	0	0
22	GK	(Malta) MLT	Rudi Briffa	1	0	0	0	1	0	0	0
Defenders
3	DF	(Malta) MLT	Carl Ciantar	17	0	15	0	2	0	0	0
4	DF	(Malta) MLT	Emerson Galea	0	0	0	0	0	0	0	0
4	DF	(Malta) MLT	Cedric Zahra	9	1	6	0	3	1	0	0
4	DF	(Malta) MLT	Jurgen Farrugia	4	0	4	0	0	0	0	0
6	DF	(Malta) MLT	Christopher Cutajar	18	1	17	1	1	0	0	0
17	DF	(Malta) MLT	Clyde Cumbo	7	0	7	0	0	0	0	0
17	DF	(Malta) MLT	Craig Joyce	1	0	1	0	0	0	0	0
19	DF	(Malta) MLT	Ryan Sammut	16	1	15	1	1	0	0	0
23	DF	(Malta) MLT	Thomas Mintoff	8	0	7	0	1	0	0	0
Midfielders
2	MF	(Malta) MLT	Randall Vella	16	1	14	1	2	0	0	0
5	MF	(Malta) MLT	Joey Vella	11	0	11	0	0	0	0	0
6	MF	(Malta) MLT	Brendan Scerri	22	1	20	0	2	1	0	0
8	MF	(England) ENG	Joey Vella	17	4	14	4	3	0	0	0
14	MF	(Malta) MLT	Fabrizio Zammit	18	2	16	1	2	1	0	0
16	MF	(Malta) MLT	Randall Vella	22	3	21	3	1	0	0	0
18	MF	(Malta) MLT	Lauro Attard	0	0	0	0	0	0	0	0
20	MF	(Malta) MLT	Lian Sciberras	1	0	1	0	0	0	0	0
66	MF	(Malta) MLT	Kyle Tanti	19	1	16	1	3	0	0	0
	MF	(Malta) MLT	Jurgen Farrugia	0	0	0	0	0	0	0	0
	MF	(Malta) MLT	Diego Christian Mifsud	0	0	0	0	0	0	0	0
Forwards
10	FW	(Brazil) BRA	Marquinho	22	2	20	1	2	1	0	0
11	FW	(Nigeria) NGA	Yusuf Sulaiman	22	9	19	7	3	2	0	0
14	FW	(Malta) MLT	James Degabriele	0	0	0	0	0	0	0	0
16	FW	(Malta) MLT	Kane Tippett	0	0	0	0	0	0	0	0
20	FW	(Malta) MLT	Ronnie Celeste	1	0	1	0	0	0	0	0
28	FW	(Malta) MLT	Gabriel Borg	0	0	0	0	0	0	0	0
31	FW	(Malta) MLT	Lee Joe Schembri	23	5	20	5	3	0	0	0
33	FW	(Malta) MLT	Dylan Micallef	21	2	19	2	2	0	0	0
99	FW	(Brazil) BRA	Samuel Saldanha	23	18	20	15	3	3	0	0
	FW	(Malta) MLT	Andrea Sant	0	0	0	0	0	0	0	0
Players transferred out during the season

Source: Competitions

Last updated: 1 August 2026

=== Goalscorers ===
Rank	No.	Pos	Nat	Name	Challenge League	FA Trophy	Play-offs	Total
1	99	FW	(Brazil)	Samuel Saldanha	15	3	0	18
2	11	FW	(Nigeria)	Yusuf Sulaiman	7	2	0	9
3	31	FW	(Malta)	Lee Joe Schembri	5	0	0	5
4	7	MF	(England)	Christopher Mario Baker	4	0	0	4
5	16	MF	(Malta)	Randall Vella	3	0	0	3
6	33	FW	(Malta)	Dylan Micallef	2	0	0	2
7	10	FW	(Brazil)	Marquinho	1	1	0	2
8	14	FW	(Malta)	Fabrizio Zammit	1	1	0	2
9	6	DF	(Malta)	Christopher Cutajar	1	0	0	1
10	19	DF	(Malta)	Ryan Sammut	1	0	0	1
11	8	MF	(Malta)	Jamie Overand	1	0	0	1
12	2	MF	(Malta)	Randall Vella	1	0	0	1
13	66	MF	(Malta)	Kyle Tanti	1	0	0	1
14		DF	(Malta)	Cedric Zahra	0	1	0	1
15	6	MF	(Malta)	Brendan Scerri	0	1	0	1
				Total	0	0	0	0

Last updated: 5 August 2026

=== Clean sheets ===
Rank	No.	Pos	Nat	Name	Challenge League	FA Trophy	Play-offs	Total
1	1	GK	(Malta)	Julian Azzopardi	7	1	0	8
2	22	GK	(Malta)	Antonio Chetcuti	1	0	0	1
3	22	GK	(Malta)	Rudi Briffa	0	1	0	1
				Total	8	2	0	10

Last updated: 1 August 2026
