= 2025–26 Birżebbuġa St. Peter's F.C. season =

Birżebbuġa St. Peter's
2025–26 season
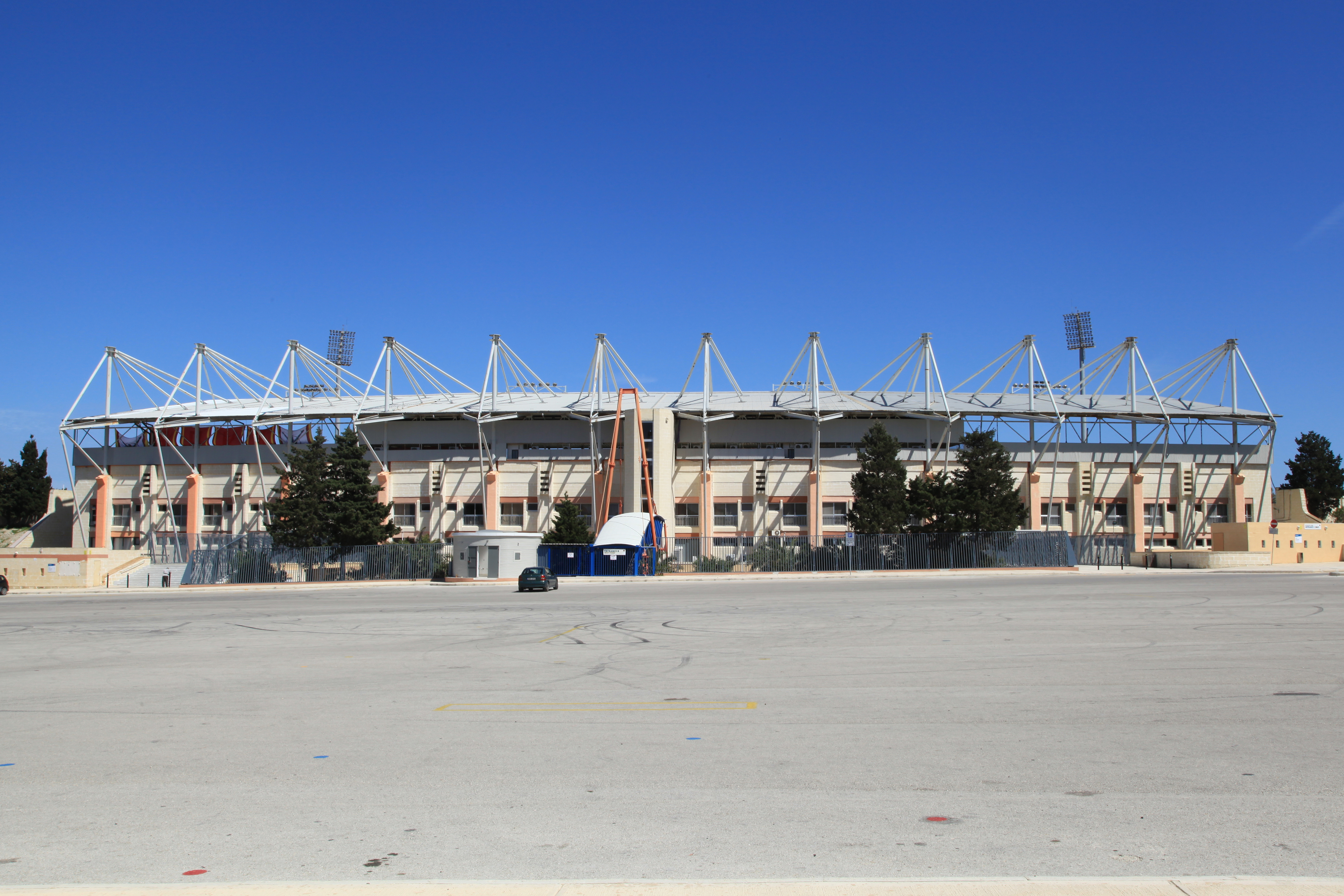
- Centenary Stadium
- Owner: Ketan Makwana
- Director: Joseph Mangion
- Manager: Edgar Degabriele
- Stadium: Centenary Stadium
- Challenge League: 2nd (Promoted)
- Maltese FA Trophy: Round of 16
- BOV Challenge Cup: Winner
- Top goalscorer: League: Paul Lapira (10); All: Paul Lapira (14)
Home colours	Away colours

During the 2025–26 season, Birżebbuġa St. Peter's F.C. competed in the Maltese Challenge League and got promoted to Maltese Premier League. In addition to the domestic league, the club will participate in this season's editions of the Maltese FA Trophy.

== Season summary ==
In April 2026, the team finished second in the Maltese Challenge League, achieving promotion to the Maltese Premier League for the first time in their history, after beating Swieqi United on penalties.

=== BOV Challenge Cup Champion ===
Birzebbuga St Peter's FC won all five matches. On 26 March 2026, in the sem-final won against Victoria Wanderers at the Gozo Stadium in Xewkija. On 3 April 2026 in the final the club won the BOV Challenge Cup after beating Melita 3-0 in an entertaining Final at the National Stadium.

== Players ==
=== Squad information ===
As of 28 July 2026

Squad no.	Name	Nationality	Position	Date of birth (age)
Goalkeepers
1	Julian Azzopardi	(Malta)	GK	9 October 1987 (aged 36)
12	Isaac Abela	(Malta)	GK	22 May 2005 (aged 19)
	Antonio Chetcuti	(Malta)	GK	21 August 1996 (aged 27)
	Rudi Briffa	(Malta)	GK	14 February 1995 (aged 29)
Defenders
3	Juan Bolaños	(Colombia)	DF	22 July 1991 (aged 33)
4	Miguel Azzopardi (on loan from Żabbar St. Patrick)	(Malta)	DF	24 May 2004 (aged 21)
6	Christopher Cutajar	(Malta)	DF	27 July 1993 (aged 31)
30	Philip Ogbile	(Nigeria)	DF	14 June 2007 (aged 18)
33	Aiden Barbara	(Malta)	DF	21 December 2007 (aged 17)
94	Daniel Zerafa	(Malta)	DF	14 June 2007 (aged 18)
	Jurgen Farrugia	(Malta)	DF	14 September 1981 (aged 43)
Midfielders
2	Nathan Attard	(Malta)	MF	8 April 1994 (aged 31)
5	Joey Vella	(Malta)	MF	27 March 1995 (aged 30)
6	Hubert Vella (Captain)	(Malta)	MF	2 November 1998 (aged 27)
7	Christopher Mario Baker	(England)	MF	15 March 1990 (aged 36)
15	Zachary Cassar	(Malta)	MF	31 July 1997 (aged 28)
16	Randall Vella	(Malta)	MF	16 April 1992 (aged 34)
17	Jacob Walker	(Malta)	MF	31 July 1997 (aged 28)
18	Renan Riquelme	(Brazil)	MF	24 July 2006 (aged 19)
23	Leonardo Agius	(Malta)	MF	17 September 2002 (aged 23)
29	Alex Bruno	(Brazil)	MF	7 October 1993 (aged 32)
	Diego Christian Mifsud	(Malta)	MF	14 August 1991 (aged 34)
Forwards
8	Matthew Xuereb	(Malta)	FW	3 March 2001 (aged 25)
9	Duván Mosquera	(Colombia)	FW	25 April 1996 (aged 30)
11	Yusuf Sulaiman	(Nigeria)	FW	15 May 2005 (aged 21)
12	Joshua Osebomen	(Nigeria)	FW	9 January 2007 (aged 19)
16	Kane Tippett	(Malta)	FW	9 May 2001 (aged 25)
19	William James England	(England)	FW	24 April 2004 (aged 22)
99	Charles Chibuike	(Nigeria)	FW	31 March 2003 (aged 23)
	Gabriel Borg	(Malta)	FW	28 September 1999 (aged 26)
	Andrea Sant	(Malta)	FW	19 December 1997 (aged 28)

== Transfers ==
=== In ===
Date	Pos.	Player	Age	Moving from	Type	Fee	Source
Summer
30 July 2025	MF	(Malta) Leonardo Agius	22	(Malta) Żabbar	Loan return	Free	
27 August 2025	FW	(Malta) Matthew Xuereb	24	(Malta) Tarxien Rainbows	Transfer	Free	
27 August 2025	GK	(Malta) James Pisani	31	(Malta) Gudja United	Transfer	Free	
28 August 2025	MF	(Malta) Paul Lapira	27	(Malta) Valletta	Transfer	Free	
29 August 2025	DF	(Malta) Daniel Zerafa	31	(Malta) Marsa	Transfer	Free	
30 August 2025	MF	(Malta) Rudy Cassar	24	(Malta) Senglea Athletic	Transfer	Free	
31 August 2025	MF	(Malta) Hubert Vella	31	(Malta) Tarxien Rainbows	Transfer	Free	
1 September 2025	DF	(Malta) Miguel Azzopardi	21	(Malta) Żabbar	Loan	Free	
1 September 2025	MF	(Brazil) Renan Riquelme	19	(Brazil) Anápolis	Transfer	Free	
1 September 2025	FW	(Brazil) David Oliveira	29	(Malta) Żabbar	Transfer	Free	
1 September 2025	MF	(Malta) Jacob Walker	27	(Malta) Valletta	Transfer	Free	
9 September 2025	DF	(Colombia) Juan Bolaños	34	Unattached	Transfer	Free	
Winter
1 January 2026	FW	(Nigeria) Joshua Osebomen	18	Unattached	Transfer	Free	
1 January 2026	DF	(Nigeria) Philip Ogbile	18	Unattached	Transfer	Free	
1 January 2026	FW	William James England	21	(Malta) Tarxien Rainbows	Transfer	Free	
9 January 2026	FW	(Nigeria) Charles Chibuike	22	(Malta) Mosta	Transfer	Free	
17 January 2026	DF	(Malta) Zachary Cassar	27	(Malta) Valletta	Transfer	Free	
17 January 2026	FW	(Brazil) Taylon	30	Unattached	Transfer	Free	
30 January 2026	MF	(Malta) Jamie Scerri	21	(Malta) Mosta	Transfer	Free	
1 February 2026	DF	(Colombia) Aiden Barbara	18	(Malta) Marsaxlokk U19	Transfer	Free	
5 February 2026	FW	(Colombia) Duván Mosquera	29	(Malta) St. Andrews	Transfer	Free	

=== Out ===
Date	Pos.	Player	Age	Moving to	Type	Fee	Source
Summer
1 November 2025	MF	(Malta) Rudy Cassar	24	(Malta) Senglea Athletic	Transfer	Free	
28 November 2025	MF	(Malta) Dylan Micallef	24	(Malta) Qrendi	Transfer	Free	
Winter
25 January 2026	FW	(Brazil) David Oliveira	29	(Malta) Nadur	Transfer	Free	
2 February 2026	FW	(Brazil) Taylon	30	(Malta) St. Andrews	Transfer	Free	

== Competitions ==
=== Overall record ===
Competition	First match	Last match	Starting round	Final position	Record							
Competition	First match	Last match	Starting round	Final position	Pld	W	D	L	GF	GA	GD	Win %
Challenge League	13 September 2025	14 February 2026		Runner-Up	22	15	3	4	50	21	+29	68.18
Maltese FA Trophy	7 December 2025	27 January 2026	Preliminary round	Round of 16	3	2	0	1	10	8	+2	66.67
BOV Challenge Cup	24 January 2026	3 April 2026	Round 1	Winners	10	5	0	5	11	1	+10	50.00
Total					35	22	3	10	71	30	+41	62.86

Last updated: 27 July 2026
Source: Results

=== Maltese Premier League ===
==== League table ====
Pos	Team	Pld	W	D	L	GF	GA	GD	Pts	Qualification
1	Balzan (C, P)	22	15	3	4	50	21	+29	48	Champion. Promoted to 2026-27 Malta Premier League
2	Birzebbuga St. Peter's (P)	22	14	4	4	47	27	+20	46	Promotion play-off
3	Swieqi United	22	14	4	4	48	28	+20	46	Promotion play-off
4	Melita	22	12	2	8	42	28	+14	38	
5	Sirens	22	11	2	9	50	33	+17	35	
6	Pietà Hotspurs	22	10	5	7	42	34	+8	35	
7	Fgura United	22	10	2	10	41	37	+4	32	
8	St. Andrews	22	8	3	11	26	38	−12	27	
9	Mgarr United	22	9	6	7	41	33	+8	33	
10	Gudja United	22	8	8	6	29	25	+4	32	
11	Santa Lucia	22	7	9	6	40	31	+9	30	
12	Żurrieq	22	8	3	11	36	38	−2	27	
13	Vittoriosa Stars	22	5	6	11	26	33	−7	21	
14	Żebbuġ Rangers	22	5	5	12	23	45	−22	20	
15	Marsa (R)	22	4	7	11	32	38	−6	19	Relegation to the 2026-27 National Amateur League
16	Mtarfa (R)	22	1	1	20	10	94	−84	−2 (Note: Mtarfa were deducted six points.)	Relegation to the 2026-27 National Amateur League

Updated to match(es) played on 24 April 2026. Source: Malta Football Association
Rules for classification: 1) Points; 2) Play-offs (only if needed to decide champions or teams for relegation).
(C) Champions; (P) Promoted; (R) Relegated
Notes:

23 April 2026	Swieqi United	1 - 1 (6-7 p)	Birzebbuga St. Peter's	Ta'Qali
	Barbara 10' (pen.); Attard (yellow card) 11'; Aquilina (yellow card) 42'; Fenech (yellow card) 66'; Hili (yellow card) 73'; Aguilar (yellow card) 88'	Report	Bolanos (yellow card) 7'; Zerafa 28', (yellow card) 11'; Azzopardi (yellow card) 88'; Xuereb (yellow card) 90+2'; Agius (yellow card) 102'	Stadium: Centenary Stadium
	Penalties
	Fenech (penalty missed); Aguilar (penalty scored); Leonardi (penalty scored); Augusto (penalty scored); Okle (penalty scored); Micallef (penalty scored); Agius (penalty scored); Okoh (penalty missed)		de Souza (penalty scored); Zerafa (penalty scored); Charles (penalty missed); Xuereb (penalty scored); Walker (penalty scored); Vella (penalty scored); Agius (penalty scored); Cassar (penalty scored)

==== Results summary ====
Overall								Home						Away					
Pld	W	D	L	GF	GA	GD	Pts	W	D	L	GF	GA	GD	W	D	L	GF	GA	GD
22	14	4	4	44	27	+17	46	8	1	2	25	13	+12	6	3	2	19	14	+5

Last updated: 28 July 2026.
Source: Results

==== Results by round ====
Round	1
Ground	
Result	
Position	

Updated to match(es) played on 21 May 2026. Source: Results
A = Away; H = Home; W = Win; D = Draw; L = Loss

=== Maltese FA Trophy ===
7 December 2025	Nadur Youngsters (Gozo) (1)	1–4	Birżebbuġa St. Peter's (2)	Xewkija (Gozo)
14:00 CET	Rodriguez 61'; Gutierrez 73' (o.g.)		Vella 8'; Oliveira 32' (pen.); Agius 71'	Stadium: Gozo Stadium

4 January 2026	Balzan (2)	1–1 (a.e.t.) (3–5 p)	Birżebbuġa St. Peter's (2)	Ta' Qali
18:30 CET	Arab (red card) 90+7'; Awosanya 109'		De Souza (red card) 90+17'; Sulaiman 94'	Stadium: Centenary Stadium
	Penalties
	Santos (penalty missed); Awosanya (penalty scored); Ciappara (penalty scored); Engerer (penalty scored)		Lapira (penalty scored); Vella (penalty scored); Zerafa (penalty scored); Grioli (penalty scored); Sulaiman (penalty scored)

27 January 2026	Żurrieq (2)	3–0	Birżebbuġa St. Peter's (2)	Hamrun
20:45 CET	Monney 19', 25' (pen.); Zammit 78'			Stadium: Victor Tedesco Stadium

=== BOV Challenge Cup ===
24 January 2026 1 Turno	Birżebbuġa St. Peter's	2–0	St. Andrews F.C.	Ta' Qali
EEST (UTC+3)				Stadium: Centenary Stadium; Referee: Daniel Casha

5 March 2026 2 Turno	Marsa	0–3	Birżebbuġa St. Peter's	Ta' Qali
EEST (UTC+3)				Stadium: Centenary Stadium; Referee: Reuben Delicata

18 March 2026 Quarti	Birżebbuġa St. Peter's	1–0	St. Andrews F.C.	Ta' Qali
EEST (UTC+3)				Stadium: Centenary Stadium; Referee: Wayne Sammut

26 March 2026 Semi-Final	Birżebbuġa St. Peter's	2–1	Victoria Wanderers	Xewkija
EEST (UTC+3)				Stadium: Gozo Stadium; Referee: Vladimir Rizoski

3 April 2026 Finals	Melita	0–3	Birżebbuġa St. Peter's	Ta' Qali
EEST (UTC+3)				Stadium: National Stadium; Referee: Daniel Portelli

== Statistics ==
=== Appearances and goals ===
No.	Pos	Nat	Player	Total		Maltese Challenge League		Maltese FA Trophy		BOV Challenge Cup		Play-offs	
No.	Pos	Nat	Player	Apps	Goals	Apps	Goals	Apps	Goals	Apps	Goals	Apps	Goals
Goalkeepers
1	GK	(Malta) MLT	Julian Azzopardi	22	0	21	0	0	0	0	0	1	0
1	GK	(Malta) MLT	Isaac Abela	0	0	0	0	0	0	0	0	0	0
26	GK	(Malta) MLT	James Pisani	10	0	2	0	3	0	5	0	0	0
Defenders
3	DF	(Colombia) COL	Juan Bolaños	28	0	19	0	3	0	5	0	1	0
4	DF	(Malta) MLT	Miguel Azzopardi	27	1	19	1	3	0	4	0	1	0
6	DF	(Malta) MLT	Christopher Cutajar	0	0	0	0	0	0	0	0	0	0
30	DF	(Nigeria) NGA	Philip Ogbile	0	0	0	0	0	0	0	0	0	0
33	DF	(Malta) MLT	Aiden Barbara	0	0	0	0	0	0	0	0	0	0
94	DF	(Malta) MLT	Daniel Zerafa	22	5	17	3	1	0	3	1	1	1
	DF	(Malta) MLT	Jurgen Farrugia	0	0	0	0	0	0	0	0	0	0
Midfielders
2	MF	(Malta) MLT	Nathan Attard	13	0	7	0	2	0	4	0	0	0
5	MF	(Malta) MLT	Joey Vella	15	0	8	0	1	0	5	0	1	0
6	MF	(Malta) MLT	Hubert Vella	24	1	18	0	2	1	3	0	1	0
7	MF	(England) ENG	Christopher Mario Baker	22	0	15	0	2	0	5	0	0	0}
10	MF	(Malta) MLT	Paul Lapira	35	16	22	10	7	3	5	3	1	0
15	MF	(Malta) MLT	Zachary Cassar	16	1	9	0	1	0	4	1	2	0
16	MF	(Malta) MLT	Randall Vella	24	1	18	1	3	0	3	0	0	0
17	MF	(Malta) MLT	Jacob Walker	30	0	21	0	3	0	5	0	1	0
18	MF	(Brazil) BRA	Renan Riquelme	1	0	1	0	0	0	0	0	0	0
23	MF	(Malta) MLT	Leonardo Agius	27	8	19	6	3	1	4	1	1	0
29	MF	(Brazil) BRA	Alex Bruno	30	9	20	8	2	0	5	1	3	0
30	MF	(Malta) MLT	Jamie Scerri	21	1	9	0	1	0	2	1	9	0
	MF	(Malta) MLT	Diego Christian Mifsud	0	0	0	0	0	0	0	0	0	0
Forwards
8	FW	(Malta) MLT	Matthew Xuereb	27	1	20	1	3	0	3	0	1	0
9	FW	(Colombia) COL	Jackson Mendoza	25	10	18	9	1	0	5	1	1	0
11	FW	(Nigeria) NGA	Yusuf Sulaiman	14	5	10	4	3	1	1	0	0	0
12	FW	(Nigeria) NGA	Joshua Osebomen	6	0	4	0	2	0	0	0	0	0
16	FW	(Malta) MLT	Kane Tippett	0	0	0	0	0	0	0	0	0	0
19	FW	(Malta) MLT	William James England	8	0	4	0	1	0	2	0	1	0
99	FW	(Nigeria) NGA	Charles Chibuike	23	5	8	3	1	0	2	1	12	1
	FW	(Malta) MLT	Gabriel Borg	0	0	0	0	0	0	0	0	0	0
	FW	(Malta) MLT	Andrea Sant	2	0	0	0	2	0	0	0	0	0
Players transferred out during the season

Source: Competitions

Last updated: 28 July 2026

=== Goalscorers ===
Rank	No.	Pos	Nat	Name	Challenge League	FA Trophy	BOV Challenge Cup	Play-offs	Total
1	10	MF	(Malta)	Paul Lapira	10	3	1	0	14
2	9	MF	(Colombia)	Jackson Mendoza	9	0	1	0	10
3	29	FW	(Brazil)	Alex Bruno	8	0	1	0	9
4	23	MF	(Colombia)	Leonardo Agius	6	1	1	0	8
5	11	FW	(Nigeria)	Yusuf Sulaiman	4	1	0	0	5
6	99	FW	(Nigeria)	Charles Chibuike	3	0	1	1	5
7	94	DF	(Malta)	Daniel Zerafa	3	0	1	1	5
8	8	FW	(Malta)	Matthew Xuereb	1	0	0	0	1
9	16	MF	(Malta)	Randall Vella	1	0	0	0	1
10	4	DF	(Malta)	Miguel Azzopardi	1	0	0	0	1
11	30	MF	(Malta)	Jamie Scerri	0	0	1	0	1
12	15	MF	(Malta)	Zachary Cassar	0	0	1	0	1
				Total	46	5	8	2	61

Last updated: 27 July 2026

=== Clean sheets ===
Rank	No.	Pos	Nat	Name	Challenge League	FA Trophy	BOV Challenge Cup	Play-offs	Total
1	1	GK	(Malta)	Julian Azzopardi	5	0	0	1	6
1	26	GK	(Malta)	James Pisani	0	0	4	0	4
				Total	5	0	4	1	10

Last updated: 27 July 2026
