= Pace Grasso Stadium =

Former football stadium in Malta

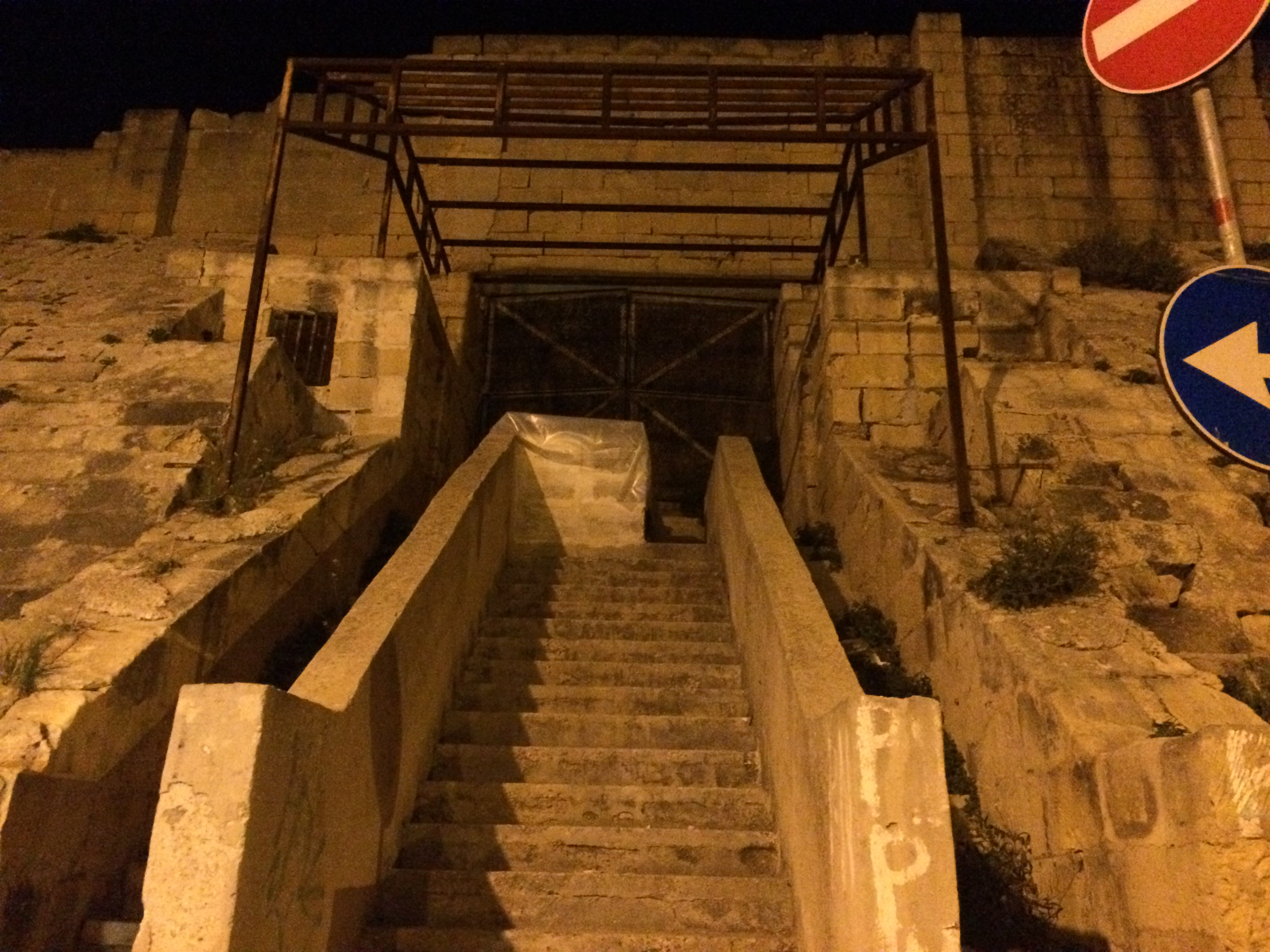
- Interactive map of Pace Grasso Stadium
- Former names: Schreiber Sports Ground
- Location: Paola, Malta
- Coordinates: 35°52′19.8″N 14°30′41.3″E
- Owner: Government of Malta
- Surface: Gravel

Construction
- Groundbreaking: 10 October 1945
- Opened: 12 October 1946
- Demolished: No but dilapidated

The Pace Grasso Stadium, formerly known as Schreiber Sports Ground, was a stadium in Paola, Malta. It was used mostly for football matches.

== History ==
The site of the stadium was formerly occupied by Tal-Borg Battery, an artillery battery built by Maltese insurgents during the French blockade of 1798–1800. The battery was probably demolished during the early 19th century.

The stadium was built in 1946 by Captain Serafino Xuereb, who at that time was also the president of Hibernians, on land provided by the Governor of Malta of that time, Sir Edmond Schreiber. Fittingly, the stadium was named as Schreiber Sports Ground but eventually it was renamed to Pace Grasso Stadium in remembrance of Harry Grasso and Victor Pace, who were both killed by an explosion caused by fireworks intended to be used for Hibernians' post-FA Trophy celebrations. Hibernians had lost the match to Sliema Wanderers on penalties.

The Schreiber Sports Ground was inaugurated on 12 October 1946 with a match from the Minor League between Mosta Youngsters and Birżebbuġa St. Peter's. In 1959, the proprietor of the stadium, Mr Xuereb, passed on the ownership of the lease to the owners of the Empire Stadium in Gżira for the sum of £9,750. The new owners originally considered the prospect of demolishing the stadium and erect a new one and move to a home-and-away system, with the clubs to the north of Malta based in the Empire Stadium and those to the south based at the redeveloped Schreiber Sports Ground. These plans however never materialised. During the season 1977-78, the lease was terminated and the stadium was taken over by the Government of Malta.

The stadium used to host matches from the lower divisions of the Maltese football league but eventually was replaced by the modern Centenary Stadium in Ta' Qali.

== Future ==
The stadium, which has since fallen in state of disrepair, was subject to a number of proposed developments. Ultimately, on 28 September 2017, the Planning Authority approved the construction of a regional health hub in the area. The project also entails the conversion of part of the Pace Grasso Stadium into temporary parking.

== Violence ==
On 14 May 1967, violence broke out and three matches had to be abandoned.

== See also ==
- List of football stadiums in Malta
