= 2024–25 Maltese Premier League =

Maltese Premier League
- Season: 2024–25
- Dates: 16 August 2024 – 10 May 2025
- Champions: Ħamrun Spartans (11th title)
- UEFA Champions League: Ħamrun Spartans
- UEFA Conference League: Floriana; Birkirkara; Hibernians
- Matches: 71
- Goals: 187 (2.63 per match)
- Top goalscorer: Maxuell Samurai Maia (8 Goals)
- Biggest home win: Floriana 3–0 Balzan (26 October 2024)
- Biggest away win: Naxxar Lions 0–6 Ħamrun Spartans (27 September 2024)
- Highest scoring: Balzan 3–3 Birkirkara (16 August 2024); Żabbar St. Patrick 3–3 Naxxar Lions (22 September 2024); Marsaxlokk 2–4 Mosta (23 September 2024); Naxxar Lions 0–6 Ħamrun Spartans (27 September 2024)
- Longest winning run: Birkirkara (9 Games)
- Longest unbeaten run: Floriana (12 Games Each)
- Longest winless run: Naxxar Lions (8 Games)
- Longest losing run: Żabbar St. Patrick (7 Games)
- Highest attendance: 16,277 Naxxar Lions vs Żabbar St. Patricks 1-1, 16,277 Hamrun Spartans vs Mosta 2-0
- Average attendance: 4,718
- All statistics correct as of 25 November 2024.

The 2024–25 Maltese Premier League was the 110th season of top-flight league football in Malta. The season began on 16 August 2024 and ended on 10 May 2025.

== Teams ==
The league consisted of twelve teams; the top ten teams from the previous season, and two teams promoted from the 2023–24 Maltese Challenge League. Ħamrun Spartans entered the season as defending champions for two consecutive seasons. Melita was promoted and returned to the Maltese Premier League after eleven years of absence. And Żabbar St. Patrick was promoted and returned to the Maltese Premier League after twenty years of absence. They replaced Gudja United, Santa Lucia and Sirens who were all relegated after five years in the top flight, and Valletta after seventy-nine years in the topflight.

Location of teams in 2024–25 Maltese Premier League

Team	In league since	City
Balzan	2011	Balzan
Birkirkara	1990	Birkirkara
Floriana	1986	Floriana
Gżira United	2016	Gżira
Ħamrun Spartans	2016	Ħamrun
Hibernians	1945	Paola
Marsaxlokk	2022	Marsaxlokk
Melita	2024	San Ġiljan
Mosta	2011	Mosta
Naxxar Lions	2023	Naxxar
Sliema Wanderers	2023	Sliema
Żabbar St. Patrick	2024	Zabbar

== Venues ==
The matches will be played mainly at the Ta' Qali National Stadium and the Tony Bezzina Stadium. However, the Centenary Stadium and the Victor Tedesco Stadium will be used as well. One match-day from the Closing Round between 28 March and 31 March will be played at the Gozo Stadium thanks to the support of the Ministry for Gozo.

2024–25 Maltese Premier League is located in Malta	Ta' Qali	Ta' Qali	Paola	Hamrun	Xewkija
2024–25 Maltese Premier League is located in Malta	Ta' Qali National Stadium	Centenary Stadium	Tony Bezzina Stadium	Victor Tedesco Stadium	Gozo Stadium
2024–25 Maltese Premier League is located in Malta	Capacity: 16,997	Capacity: 3,000	Capacity: 2,968	Capacity: 1,962	Capacity: 1,644

=== Personnel and kits ===
Team	Manager	Kit manufacturer	Shirt sponsor (front)	Shirt sponsor (back)	Shirt sponsor (sleeve)
Balzan	(England) Dave Rogers	Joma	MBI Group	Visit Malta (Bottom)	
Birkirkara	(Italy) Stefano De Angelis	Nike	McDonald's	Inter Sport (Bottom)	
Floriana	(Malta) Darren Abdilla	Joma	Harmont & Blaine, Greens Supermarket		Go & Fun (Right)
Gżira United	(Italy) Giovanni Tedesco	Joma			Miracles Food (Left)
Ħamrun Spartans	(Italy) Alessandro Zinnari	Puma	JP (Home Kit), Mercury (Away Kit)	Meridianbet, Besteam audio, Visit Malta (Bottom)	Ta' Fonzu (Right), Tescoma (Left)
Hibernians	(Serbia) Branko Nišević	Joma	Bezzina		
Marsaxlokk	(Italy) Enzo Potenza	Joma	1padel		Mr. Fitz Restaurant Marsaxlokk (Left)
Melita	(Malta) Clive Mizzi	Hummel	Atlas Insurance	Burger King (Top).Browns, Eurosport (Bottom)	I nouv (Right), VIBE (Left)
Mosta	(Malta) Joseph Grech	Macron	Simply Clean	Highbet (Top), Teamsport (Bottom)	
Naxxar Lions	(Malta) George Vella	Joma	VC Service Station	Zarb Coaches, Haier Air Conditioner (Top), McQueen, Sammut Concrete Supplies (Bottom)	Fastdrop (Right), Hi Koki, Würth, Falcotra (Left)
Sliema Wanderers	(Malta) Paul Zammit	Adidas	NMGroup, Inter Wetter	Visit Malta (Top), Thomas Smith, Zarb Coaches (Bottom)	Fonicom (Left), Domnic Sciberras Roof Repair (Right)
Żabbar St. Patrick	(Italy) Aniello Parisi	Erreà	The Shoreline	DL Group (Top), Kristal (Bottom)	

- Additionally, referee kits are made by Macron

== Managerial changes ==
Team	Outgoing manager	Manner of departure	Date of vacancy	Position in table	Incoming manager	Date of appointment
Żabbar St. Patrick	(Argentina) Emilio Cornago San Pedro	Resigned	17 April 2024	Pre-season	(Portugal) João Janeiro	16 May 2024
Balzan	(Malta) Oliver Spiteri	Resigned	4 May 2024	Pre-season	(England) Dave Rogers	3 June 2024
Ħamrun Spartans	(Italy) Luciano Zauri	Resigned	13 May 2024	Pre-season	(Italy) Alessandro Zinnari	17 May 2024
Birkirkara	(Malta) Jose Borg	End of Contract	13 May 2024	Pre-season	(Italy) Stefano De Angelis	7 June 2024
Floriana	(Italy) Mauro Camoranesi	Mutual Consent	15 May 2024	Pre-season	(Malta) Darren Abdilla	21 May 2024
Marsaxlokk	(Malta) Winston Muscat	Sacked	24 September 2024	12th	(Italy) Enzo Potenza	24 September 2024
Żabbar St. Patrick	(Portugal) João Janeiro	Mutual Consent	4 October 2024	12th	(Italy) Aniello Parisi	10 October 2024
Gżira United	(Malta) Andrew Cohen	Resign	9 November 2024	7th	(Italy) Giovanni Tedesco	14 November 2024

== Format ==
The new league format, which will come into being from the 2024–25 season, the Maltese Premier League will be made up of 12 teams and be split into an Opening Round and Closing Round in a way that is similar to domestic footballing systems used in South America. The Opening Round will see each of the 12 teams play each other once before the league is then split between a Top 6 and a Bottom 6, allowing for the teams in each of those splits to play each other another time. Once the ranking is set, each team will go back down to 0 points and start from scratch in the Closing Round, where the same process will be repeated.

The league champions and the teams for UEFA competitions are determined as follow:

- If both the Opening Round and the Closing Round are won by the same team:
  - The winners of the Opening and the Closing Rounds are declared the league champions and qualify for the UEFA Champions League;
  - Second placed teams in the Opening Round and the Closing Round qualify for the UEFA Conference League;
  - If the same team finishes second in both the Opening and the Closing Rounds, a playoff match between third placed teams in the Opening Round and the Closing Round is played for the remaining spot in the UEFA Conference League;
- If the champions of the Opening Round are placed second in the Closing Round, and the champions of the Closing Round are placed second in the Opening Round:
  - A playoff match between the champions of the Opening and the Closing Round is played to determine the league champions;
  - A playoff match between third placed teams in the Opening Round and the Closing Round is played for the remaining spot in the UEFA Conference League;
- Otherwise, a Final Four tournament between winners and runners-up of the Opening and the Closing Rounds is played (if the same team finishes second in both the Opening and the Closing Rounds, the third placed team with the best aggregate points is included in the Final Four tournament), with the teams seeded based on the aggregate points

== Opening Round ==
=== First phase ===
==== League table ====
Pos	Team	Pld	W	D	L	GF	GA	GD	Pts	Qualification
1	Birkirkara	11	9	1	1	19	8	+11	28	Qualification for the Top Six
2	Floriana	11	6	5	0	21	8	+13	23	Qualification for the Top Six
3	Sliema Wanderers	11	6	4	1	15	5	+10	22	Qualification for the Top Six
4	Hibernians	11	6	3	2	13	7	+6	21	Qualification for the Top Six
5	Mosta	11	5	1	5	15	16	−1	16	Qualification for the Top Six
6	Ħamrun Spartans	11	4	2	5	19	15	+4	14 (Note: Head-to-head points: Ħamrun Spartans 3; Gżira United 0.)	Qualification for the Top Six
7	Gżira United	11	4	2	5	15	15	0	14	Qualification for the Play-Out
8	Melita	11	3	3	5	16	19	−3	12 (Note: Head-to-head away goals: Melita 3; Marsaxlokk 0.)	Qualification for the Play-Out
9	Marsaxlokk	11	3	3	5	13	16	−3	12	Qualification for the Play-Out
10	Balzan	11	2	3	6	11	19	−8	9	Qualification for the Play-Out
11	Naxxar Lions	11	1	4	6	7	21	−14	7	Qualification for the Play-Out
12	Żabbar St. Patrick	11	1	1	9	12	27	−15	4	Qualification for the Play-Out

Source: Malta Football Association
Rules for classification: 1) Points; 2) Head-to-head points; 3) Head-to-head goal difference; 4) Head-to-head goals scored; 5) Goal difference; 6) Goals scored; 7) Play-offs (only if needed to decide champions, teams for relegation or teams for UEFA competitions).

==== Results ====
Home \ Away	BAL	BIR	FLO	GŻI	ĦAM	HIB	MAR	MEL	MOS	NXR	SLI	ZAB
Balzan	—	3–3	—	2–1	1–1	0–1	—	—	—	2–0	—	0–2
Birkirkara	—	—	1–3	—	3–2	—	—	—	—	1–0	1–0	1–0
Floriana	3–0	—	—	2–1	—	1–1	—	3–3	—	—	0–0	—
Gżira United	—	0–1	—	—	1–2	—	—	—	2–0	—	2–2	3–1
Ħamrun Spartans	—	—	1–1	—	—	0–2	2–3	2–1	—	—	—	3–1
Hibernians	—	0–2	—	2–0	—	—	—	2–0	—	—	0–0	—
Marsaxlokk	2–1	0–2	1–1	0–1	—	1–1	—	1–2	2–4	—	0–1	—
Melita	2–0	0–3	—	2–3	—	—	—	—	1–2	—	—	—
Mosta	2–2	0–1	0–2	—	1–0	1–0	—	—	—	—	—	4–2
Naxxar Lions	—	—	0–2	1–1	0–6	1–2	0–0	0–0	2–1	—	0–3	—
Sliema Wanderers	2–0	—	—	—	1–0	—	—	2–2	2–0	—	—	2–0
Żabbar St. Patrick	—	—	0–3	—	—	1–2	1–3	1–3	—	3–3	—	—

Source: Malta Football Association
Legend: Blue = home team win; Yellow = draw; Red = away team win.

=== Second phase ===
==== Top Six ====
Pos	Team	Pld	W	D	L	GF	GA	GD	Pts	Qualification	FLO	BIR	SLI	HIB	ĦAM	MOS
1	Floriana (W)	16	10	5	1	27	10	+17	35	Opening Round Winners	—	—	1–0	2–0	1–2	1–0
2	Birkirkara	16	10	2	4	22	14	+8	32		0–1	—	1–1	0–2	0–2	2–0
3	Sliema Wanderers	16	8	6	2	23	10	+13	30		—	—	—	3–1	1–1	3–1
4	Hibernians	16	8	3	5	19	17	+2	27		—	—	—	—	0–3	3–2
5	Ħamrun Spartans	16	7	3	6	28	19	+9	24		—	—	—	—	—	1–2
6	Mosta	16	6	1	9	20	26	−6	19		—	—	—	—	—	—

Source: Malta Football Association
Rules for classification: 1) Points; 2) Head-to-head points; 3) Head-to-head goal difference; 4) Head-to-head goals scored; 5) Goal difference; 6) Goals scored; 7) Play-offs (only if needed to decide champions, teams for relegation or teams for UEFA competitions).
(W) Opening Round Winners

==== Play-Out ====
Pos	Team	Pld	W	D	L	GF	GA	GD	Pts	Relegation	GŻI	MAR	MEL	ZAB	BAL	NXR
7	Gżira United	16	6	4	6	20	20	0	22		—	0–0	0–2	2–1	2–1	1–1
8	Marsaxlokk	16	5	6	5	21	21	0	21		—	—	—	2–2	2–1	1–1
9	Melita	16	5	3	8	20	26	−6	18		—	1–3	—	0–1	1–0	0–3
10	Żabbar St. Patrick	16	4	2	10	21	32	−11	14		—	—	—	—	—	—
11	Balzan	16	3	3	10	16	27	−11	12 (Note: Head-to-head points: Balzan 6; Naxxar Lions 0.)	Opening Round Relegation	—	—	—	1–2	—	2–1
12	Naxxar Lions	16	2	6	8	13	28	−15	12	Opening Round Relegation	—	—	—	0–3	—	—

Source: Malta Football Association
Rules for classification: 1) Points; 2) Head-to-head points; 3) Head-to-head goal difference; 4) Head-to-head goals scored; 5) Goal difference; 6) Goals scored; 7) Play-offs (only if needed to decide champions, teams for relegation or teams for UEFA competitions).

== Closing Round ==
=== First phase ===
==== League table ====
Pos	Team	Pld	W	D	L	GF	GA	GD	Pts	Qualification
1	Birkirkara	11	5	4	2	20	10	+10	19 (Note: Head-to-head away goals: Birkirkara 7; Floriana 4; Mosta 3; Marsaxlokk 2.)	Qualification for the Top Six
2	Floriana	11	5	4	2	15	9	+6	19	Qualification for the Top Six
3	Mosta	11	6	1	4	14	13	+1	19	Qualification for the Top Six
4	Marsaxlokk	11	6	1	4	18	13	+5	19	Qualification for the Top Six
5	Sliema Wanderers	11	6	0	5	18	13	+5	18	Qualification for the Top Six
6	Ħamrun Spartans	11	5	2	4	15	8	+7	17 (Note: Head-to-head points: Ħamrun Spartans 3; Hibernians 0.)	Qualification for the Top Six
7	Hibernians	11	5	2	4	17	17	0	17	Qualification for the Play-Out
8	Żabbar St. Patrick	11	4	2	5	15	12	+3	14	Qualification for the Play-Out
9	Gżira United	11	3	3	5	8	16	−8	12	Qualification for the Play-Out
10	Balzan	11	2	4	5	11	18	−7	10 (Note: Head-to-head away goals: Balzan 4; Naxxar Lions 3; Melita 1;)	Qualification for the Play-Out
11	Naxxar Lions	11	3	1	7	11	24	−13	10	Qualification for the Play-Out
12	Melita	11	2	4	5	15	24	−9	10	Qualification for the Play-Out

Source: Malta Football Association
Rules for classification: 1) Points; 2) Head-to-head points; 3) Head-to-head goal difference; 4) Head-to-head goals scored; 5) Goal difference; 6) Goals scored; 7) Play-offs (only if needed to decide champions, teams for relegation or teams for UEFA competitions).

==== Results ====
Home \ Away	BAL	BIR	FLO	GŻI	ĦAM	HIB	MAR	MEL	MOS	NXR	SLI	ZAB
Balzan	—	—	0–0	—	—	—	0–3	1–1	3–2	—	2–3	—
Birkirkara	5–2	—	—	2–2	—	2–0	1–1	1–1	2–0	—	—	—
Floriana	—	0–2	—	—	0–0	1–1	2–1	—	2–2	4–0	—	1–0
Gżira United	0–0	—	0–3	—	—	1–4	0–1	2–2	—	1–0	—	—
Ħamrun Spartans	1–0	0–0	—	0–1	—	—	—	—	1–2	4–0	0–1	—
Hibernians	0–0	—	—	—	1–2	—	0–1	—	2–0	3–2	—	0–4
Marsaxlokk	—	—	—	—	1–6	—	—	—	—	—	—	3–1
Melita	—	—	2–0	—	2–0	2–3	0–5	—	—	2–5	2–4	1–1
Mosta	—	—	—	1–0	—	—	2–1	2–0	—	1–0	0–1	—
Naxxar Lions	0–3	2–1	—	—	—	—	1–0	—	—	—	—	1–1
Sliema Wanderers	—	2–1	1–2	0–1	—	2–3	0–1	—	—	4–0	—	—
Żabbar St. Patrick	3–0	0–3	—	3–0	0–1	—	—	—	1–2	—	1–0	—

Source: Malta Football Association
Legend: Blue = home team win; Yellow = draw; Red = away team win.

=== Second phase ===
==== Top Six ====
Pos	Team	Pld	W	D	L	GF	GA	GD	Pts	Qualification	SLI	ĦAM	FLO	MAR	BIR	MOS
1	Sliema Wanderers (W)	16	9	1	6	27	17	+10	28 (Note: Head-to-head points:Sliema Wanderers 4; Ħamrun Spartans 1.)	Closing Round Winners	—	1–1	—	—	—	—
2	Ħamrun Spartans	16	8	4	4	20	9	+11	28		—	—	—	—	—	—
3	Floriana	16	7	6	3	21	13	+8	27		0–2	0–0	—	2–1	—	3–0
4	Marsaxlokk	16	8	2	6	26	18	+8	26		2–1	0–1	—	—	—	—
5	Birkirkara	16	6	6	4	23	14	+9	24		0–1	0–1	1–1	1–1	—	1–0
6	Mosta	16	6	1	9	15	27	−12	19		1–4	0–2	—	0–4	—	—

Rules for classification: 1) Points; 2) Head-to-head points; 3) Head-to-head goal difference; 4) Head-to-head goals scored; 5) Goal difference; 6) Goals scored; 7) Play-offs (only if needed to decide champions, teams for relegation or teams for UEFA competitions).
(W) Closing Round Winners

==== Play-Out ====
Pos	Team	Pld	W	D	L	GF	GA	GD	Pts	Relegation	ZAB	HIB	NXR	GŻI	BAL	MEL
7	Żabbar St. Patrick	16	6	4	6	24	18	+6	22 (Note: Head-to-head away goals: Żabbar St. Patrick 4; Hibernians 1.)		—	2–2	2–0	1–2	2–2	2–0
8	Hibernians	16	6	4	6	24	23	+1	22		—	—	0–1	1–2	1–1	3–0
9	Naxxar Lions	16	6	2	8	17	27	−10	20 (Note: Head-to-head goal difference: Naxxar Lions 1; Gżira United -1.)		—	—	—	—	—	2–0
10	Gżira United	16	5	5	6	14	22	−8	20		—	—	0–2	—	0–0	2–2
11	Balzan	16	3	8	5	18	23	−5	17	Closing Round Relegation	—	—	1–1	—	—	3–1
12	Melita	16	2	5	9	18	36	−18	11	Closing Round Relegation	—	—	—	—	—	—

Source: Malta Football Association Flashfootball.com
Rules for classification: 1) Points; 2) Head-to-head points; 3) Head-to-head goal difference; 4) Head-to-head goals scored; 5) Goal difference; 6) Goals scored; 7) Play-offs (only if needed to decide champions, teams for relegation or teams for UEFA competitions).

== Aggregate table ==
=== League table ===
Pos	Team	Pld	W	D	L	GF	GA	GD	Pts	
1	Floriana	32	17	11	4	48	23	+25	62	Qualification for the Final Four
2	Sliema Wanderers	32	17	7	8	50	27	+23	58	Qualification for the Final Four
3	Birkirkara	32	16	8	8	45	28	+17	56	Qualification for the Final Four
4	Ħamrun Spartans (C)	32	15	7	10	48	28	+20	52	Qualification for the Final Four
5	Hibernians	32	14	7	11	43	40	+3	49	Qualification for the Conference League second qualifying round (Note: Hibernians qualified as 2024–25 Maltese FA Trophy winners.)
6	Marsaxlokk	32	13	8	11	47	39	+8	47	
7	Gżira United	32	11	9	12	34	42	−8	42	
8	Mosta	32	12	2	18	35	53	−18	38	
9	Żabbar St. Patrick	32	10	6	16	45	50	−5	36	
10	Naxxar Lions (O)	32	8	8	16	30	55	−25	32	Qualification for the Relegation play-off
11	Melita (R)	32	7	8	17	38	62	−24	29 (Note: Head-to-head points: Melita 7; Balzan 4.)	Qualification for the Relegation play-off
12	Balzan (R)	32	6	11	15	34	50	−16	29	Relegation to 2025–26 Maltese Challenge League

Source: Malta Football Association
Rules for classification: 1) Points; 2) Head-to-head points; 3) Head-to-head goal difference; 4) Head-to-head goals scored; 5) Goal difference; 6) Goals scored; 7) Play-offs (only if needed to decide champions, teams for relegation or teams for UEFA competitions).
(C) Champions; (O) Play-off relegation winner; (R) Relegated

== Play-off Championship ==
Since the Opening Round Top 2 and the Closing Round Top 2 are four different teams, there would be a play-off between the top two teams from the Opening Round, Floriana and Birkirkara, and the Closing Round, Sliema Wanderers and Ħamrun Spartans.

=== Bracket ===
Semi-finals
4 May
Sliema Wanderers	0
Birkirkara	1
5 May
Floriana	0 (2)
Ħamrun Spartans	0 (4)

Final
10 May
Birkirkara	0
Ħamrun Spartans	1
Third place play-off
9 May
Sliema Wanderers	0
Floriana	4

=== Semi-finals ===
4 May 2025
18:00

Sliema Wanderers	0–1 (a.e.t.)	Birkirkara
		Maxuell 120+2'

Ta' Qali National Stadium, Ta' Qali
Referee: Alex Johnson

5 May 2025
19:15

Floriana	0–0 (a.e.t.)	Ħamrun Spartans
Penalties
Fernandinho (penalty scored); Mashike (penalty missed); Gamarra (penalty missed); Grech (penalty scored)	2–4	(penalty scored) Emerson; (penalty scored) Čađenović; (penalty scored) Mbong; (penalty scored) Lopes

Ta' Qali National Stadium, Ta' Qali
Referee: Fyodor Zammit

=== Third place play-off ===
9 May 2025
20:30

Sliema Wanderers	0–4	Floriana
		Becerra 35'; Fernandinho 52'; Sasere 66'; Mashike 90'

Tony Bezzina Stadium, Paola
Referee: Matthew De Gabriele

=== Final ===
10 May 2025
18:00

Birkirkara	0–1	Ħamrun Spartans
		Prša 63'

Ta' Qali National Stadium, Ta' Qali
Referee: Ishmael Barbara

== Relegation play-off ==
Since the Opening Round and the Closing Round have three different teams. Balzan finish Bottom two in the Opening Round and the Closing Round therefore immediately relegated. However, Naxxar Lions and Melita had to play a decision game to determine the second-relegated team.

9 May 2025
18:15

Naxxar Lions	1–0	Melita
Hugo Santos 45+3'

Tony Bezzina Stadium, Paola
Referee: Philip Farrugia

== Season statistics ==
=== Scoring ===
==== Top scorers ====
As of 23 November 2024

Rank	Player	Club	Goals
1	(Brazil) Maxuell Samurai Maia	Birkirkara	9
2	(Nigeria) Franklin Sasere	Floriana	7
3	(Brazil) Andre Carlos Penha Da Costa	Melita	6
4	(England) Udoyen Akpan	Balzan	5
4	(Brazil) Alex (Lecao) Da Paixao Alves	Gżira United	5
4	(Malta) Gabriel Mentz Bohre	Gżira United	5
4	(Malta) Luke Montebello	Ħamrun Spartans	5
4	(Malta) Jurgen Degabriele	Hibernians	5
4	(Brazil) Alex De Aguiar Gomes	Marsaxlokk	5

==== Hat-tricks ====
Player	For	Against	Result	Stadium	Date
(Brazil) Maxuell Samurai Maia	Birkirkara	Balzan	3–3 (A)	Ta' Qali National Stadium, Ta' Qali	16 August 2024

== See also ==
- 2024–25 Maltese Challenge League
- 2024–25 Maltese National Amateur League
- 2024–25 Maltese National Amateur League II
- 2024–25 Maltese FA Trophy
