= 2025–26 Maltese Challenge League =

Maltese Challenge League
- Season: 2025–26
- Dates: 13 September 2025 – 23 April 2026
- Champions: Balzan
- Promoted: Birzebbuga St. Peter's
- Relegated: Marsa; Mtarfa
- Matches: 177
- Goals: 582 (3.29 per match)
- Top goalscorer: Cristhyan Noto Souza (Mgarr United); Arthur Stelmach Santana (Pieta Hotspurs) (18 goals)
- All statistics correct as of 24 April 2026.

The 2025–26 Maltese Challenge League (referred to as the BOV Challenge League for sponsorship reasons) is the second-level league football in Malta. It is the sixth season that the competition has been running in its present form.

== Teams ==
The league consists of sixteen teams; twelve teams remaining from the previous season, two teams promoted from the 2024-25 Maltese National Amateur League, and two teams relegated from the 2024-25 Maltese Premier League.

=== Team changes ===
The following teams have changed divisions since the 2024–25 season:

==== To Maltese Challenge League ====
Promoted from Maltese National Amateur League

- Birzebbuga St. Peter's
- Vittoriosa Stars

Relegated from the Maltese Premier League

- Balzan
- Melita

==== From Maltese Challenge League ====
Promoted to the Maltese Premier League

- Tarxien Rainbows
- Valletta

Relegated to Maltese National Amateur League

- Lija Athletic
- Senglea Athletic

Location of teams in 2025–26 Maltese Challenge League

Team	Location	Manager
Balzan	Balzan	(Malta) Andrew Cohen
Birzebbuga St. Peter's	Birzebbuga	(Malta) Edgar Degabriele
Fgura United	Fgura	(Malta) Kevin Vella
Gudja United	Gudja	(Nigeria) Orosco Anonam
Marsa	Marsa	(Malta) Ryan Fenech
Melita	San Ġiljan	(Malta) Brian Said
Mgarr United	Mgarr	(Malta) Shaun Bajada
Mtarfa	Mtarfa	(Malta) Ludvic Bartolo
Pietà Hotspurs	Pietà	(Malta) Manuel Caruana
Santa Lucia	Santa Luċija	(Malta) Joseph Galea
Sirens	St. Paul's Bay	(Malta) Stephen Damato
St. Andrews	St. Andrew's, Malta	(Malta) Jose` Borg
Swieqi United	Swieqi	(Malta) Liam Mangion
Vittoriosa Stars	Birgu	(Malta) Jason Camenzuli
Żebbuġ Rangers	Żebbuġ	(Malta) Saviour Debono Grech
Żurrieq	Żurrieq	(Malta) Brian Spiteri

== Venues ==
Ta' Qali	Ta' Qali	Location of host stadia during the 2025-26 Maltese Challenge League
Ta' Qali National Stadium	Centenary Stadium	Location of host stadia during the 2025-26 Maltese Challenge League
Capacity: 16,997	Capacity: 3,000	Location of host stadia during the 2025-26 Maltese Challenge League
St. Paul's Bay	Hamrun	Location of host stadia during the 2025-26 Maltese Challenge League
Sirens Stadium	Victor Tedesco Stadium	Location of host stadia during the 2025-26 Maltese Challenge League
Capacity: 1,024	Capacity: 1,962	Location of host stadia during the 2025-26 Maltese Challenge League

== Regular season ==
During the regular season, each team plays each other once (either at home or at away). The top eight teams qualify for the Top eight, while the bottom eight teams qualify for the Play-Out.

=== League table ===
Pos	Team	Pld	W	D	L	GF	GA	GD	Pts	Qualification
1	Balzan	15	11	2	2	37	10	+27	35	Qualification for the Top Eight
2	Melita	15	10	2	3	36	17	+19	32	Qualification for the Top Eight
3	Birzebbuga St. Peter's	15	10	1	4	29	15	+14	31	Qualification for the Top Eight
4	Sirens	15	9	2	4	39	19	+20	29	Qualification for the Top Eight
5	Swieqi United	15	9	2	4	32	23	+9	29	Qualification for the Top Eight
6	Fgura United	15	8	1	6	33	24	+9	25	Qualification for the Top Eight
7	Pietà Hotspurs	15	7	3	5	27	21	+6	24	Qualification for the Top Eight
8	St. Andrews	15	7	2	6	19	23	−4	23	Qualification for the Top Eight
9	Mgarr United	15	6	4	5	28	24	+4	22	Qualification for the Play-Out
10	Gudja United	15	5	7	3	16	13	+3	22	Qualification for the Play-Out
11	Santa Lucia	15	4	6	5	27	25	+2	18	Qualification for the Play-Out
12	Żurrieq	15	4	2	9	21	27	−6	14	Qualification for the Play-Out
13	Vittoriosa Stars	15	3	3	9	17	24	−7	12	Qualification for the Play-Out
14	Marsa	15	2	4	9	18	28	−10	10	Qualification for the Play-Out
15	Żebbuġ Rangers	15	2	2	11	9	37	−28	8	Qualification for the Play-Out
16	Mtarfa	15	1	1	13	9	67	−58	−2 (Note: Mtarfa were deducted six points.)	Qualification for the Play-Out

Updated to match(es) played on 1 February 2026. Source: Malta Football Association
Rules for classification: 1) Points; 2) Play-offs (only if needed to decide champions or teams for relegation).

=== Results ===
Home \ Away	BAL	BRZ	FGU	GUD	MEL	MSA	MGR	MTF	PIE	STL	SIR	STA	SWQ	VIT	ZEB	ZUR
Balzan	—	3–0		0–1				4–0	1–1				4–0	4–1	4–0	
Birzebbuga St. Peter's		—		2–1		1–0		8–2	3–2			1–0				
Fgura United	1–2	0–3	—	1–1	2–3			8–0		2–0	1–5					
Gudja United				—		1–1					1–0	0–1		1–0	1–1	1–0
Melita		0–2		2–2	—	3–2		4–0	3–1				1–2			
Marsa			1–3			—	2–3			2–2	2–2	1–2			0–1	1–3
Mgarr United	1–4	1–0			1–3		—			3–3	2–3		5–1			
Mtarfa				0–3		0–2	1–3	—				0–2		1–2	4–1	
Pietà Hotspurs			1–0	1–1		1–0	1–1		—			1–3		2–0	4–1	
Santa Lucia	1–1				2–2			7–0	0–1	—			1–3		0–0	
Sirens	1–3	1–2			2–1				4–1	3–5	—		1–1			
St. Andrews	0–2		1–2		1–0		0–4				0–4	—		3–3		
Swieqi United								8–0	3–1			1–1	—	3–2	3–1	3–1
Vittoriosa Stars		1–1	2–3				1–0			0–2	0–1			—		0–1
Żebbuġ Rangers			0–1		1–4		0–1							0–4	—	1–4
Żurrieq	0–1	2–3	1–4		1–5		1–1	1–1		4–0						—

Updated to match(es) played on 1 February 2026. Source: Malta Football Association
Legend: Blue = home team win; Yellow = draw; Red = away team win.
For upcoming matches, an "a" indicates there is an article about the rivalry between the two participants.

== Top Eight and Play Out ==
=== League table ===
Pos	Team	Pld	W	D	L	GF	GA	GD	Pts	Qualification
1	Balzan (C, P)	22	15	3	4	50	21	+29	48	Champion. Promoted to 2026-27 Malta Premier League
2	Birzebbuga St. Peter's (P)	22	14	4	4	47	27	+20	46	Promotion play-off
3	Swieqi United	22	14	4	4	48	28	+20	46	Promotion play-off
4	Melita	22	12	2	8	42	28	+14	38	
5	Sirens	22	11	2	9	50	33	+17	35	
6	Pietà Hotspurs	22	10	5	7	42	34	+8	35	
7	Fgura United	22	10	2	10	41	37	+4	32	
8	St. Andrews	22	8	3	11	26	38	−12	27	
9	Mgarr United	22	9	6	7	41	33	+8	33	
10	Gudja United	22	8	8	6	29	25	+4	32	
11	Santa Lucia	22	7	9	6	40	31	+9	30	
12	Żurrieq	22	8	3	11	36	38	−2	27	
13	Vittoriosa Stars	22	5	6	11	26	33	−7	21	
14	Żebbuġ Rangers	22	5	5	12	23	45	−22	20	
15	Marsa (R)	22	4	7	11	32	38	−6	19	Relegation to the 2026-27 National Amateur League
16	Mtarfa (R)	22	1	1	20	10	94	−84	−2 (Note: Mtarfa were deducted six points.)	Relegation to the 2026-27 National Amateur League

Updated to match(es) played on 24 April 2026. Source: Malta Football Association
Rules for classification: 1) Points; 2) Play-offs (only if needed to decide champions or teams for relegation).
(C) Champions; (P) Promoted; (R) Relegated

=== Top 8 Results ===
Home \ Away	BAL	BRZ	FGU	MEL	PIE	SIR	STA	SWQ
Balzan	—	3–3		2–0			1–4	1–2
Birzebbuga St. Peter's		—	3–1	2–1	2–2	3–2		
Fgura United	1–2		—		0–4		2–0	
Melita			0–1	—		2–0	3–0	
Pietà Hotspurs	1–3			1–0	—		2–2	1–3
Sirens	0–1		3–2		3–4	—		
St. Andrews		1–3				0–3	—	0–1
Swieqi United		2–2	1–1	5–0		2–0		—

Updated to match(es) played on 24 April 2026. Source: Malta Football Association
Legend: Blue = home team win; Yellow = draw; Red = away team win.
For upcoming matches, an "a" indicates there is an article about the rivalry between the two participants.

=== Play Out Results ===
Home \ Away	GUD	MSA	MGR	MTF	STL	VIT	ZEB	ZUR
Gudja United	—			3–0			1–3	0–3
Marsa	3–3	—	1–2	5–0		2–2		
Mgarr United	0–2		—	5–0	1–1	1–1		
Mtarfa				—	1–5	0–1		0–2
Santa Lucia	2–1	0–1			—		1–1	3–0
Vittoriosa Stars	2–3				1–1	—	0–1	2–1
Żebbuġ Rangers		1–1	0–2	6–0			—	
Żurrieq		2–1	4–2				3–3	—

Updated to match(es) played on 24 April 2026. Source: Malta Football Association
Legend: Blue = home team win; Yellow = draw; Red = away team win.
For upcoming matches, an "a" indicates there is an article about the rivalry between the two participants.

=== Promotion Playoff ===
Due to Swieqi United and Birżebbuġa St. Peter's both finishing equal on points and goal difference, a playoff was required to take place to determine who got the second promotion place. Birżebbuġa St. Peter's won the playoff on penalties.

23 April 2026	Swieqi United	1 - 1 (6-7 p)	Birzebbuga St. Peter's	Ta'Qali
	Barbara 10' (pen.); Attard (yellow card) 11'; Aquilina (yellow card) 42'; Fenech (yellow card) 66'; Hili (yellow card) 73'; Aguilar (yellow card) 88'	Report	Bolanos (yellow card) 7'; Zerafa 28', (yellow card) 11'; Azzopardi (yellow card) 88'; Xuereb (yellow card) 90+2'; Agius (yellow card) 102'	Stadium: Centenary Stadium
	Penalties
	Fenech (penalty missed); Aguilar (penalty scored); Leonardi (penalty scored); Augusto (penalty scored); Okle (penalty scored); Micallef (penalty scored); Agius (penalty scored); Okoh (penalty missed)		de Souza (penalty scored); Zerafa (penalty scored); Charles (penalty missed); Xuereb (penalty scored); Walker (penalty scored); Vella (penalty scored); Agius (penalty scored); Cassar (penalty scored)
