= List of football stadiums in Malta =

The following is a partial list of football stadiums in Malta, ranked in order of capacity, with the minimum capacity being 1,000. Although a number of teams participating in the Maltese football league system own or operate their own stadium, Maltese football league matches are generally played at a neutral stadium.

== Current stadiums ==
#	Image	Stadium	Capacity	City	Home team	Surface	Ref
1		National Stadium, Ta' Qali	16,907	Ta' Qali	Malta national football team Maltese Premier League	Hybrid grass	
2		Tony Bezzina Stadium	3,038	Paola	Hibernians F.C. Malta women's national football team Maltese Premier League	Hybrid grass	
3		Centenary Stadium	3,000	Ta' Qali	Malta national under-21 football team Malta women's national football team Maltese Premier League; Maltese Challenge League; Maltese Women's League	Artificial turf	
4		Victor Tedesco Stadium	1,962	Ħamrun	Ħamrun Spartans F.C. Maltese Challenge League; Maltese National Amateur League	Artificial turf	
5		Gozo Stadium	1,628	Xewkija (Gozo)	Gozo national football team Gozo Football League First Division	Hybrid grass	
6		Birżebbuġa Football Center	1,200	Birżebbuġa	Birżebbuġa Football Center; Maltese Premier League	Artificial grass	
7		Luxol Stadium	800	Pembroke	St. Andrews; Maltese National Amateur League	Artificial turf	
8		Sirens Stadium	600	St. Paul's Bay	Sirens F.C. Maltese National Amateur League	Artificial turf	
9		Charles Abela Memorial Stadium	700	Mosta	Maltese National Amateur League; Maltese youth football league	Artificial turf	
10		Rabat Ajax Football Ground	700	Mtarfa	Rabat Ajax	Artificial turf	
11		Kerċem Ajax Stadium	500	Kerċem (Gozo)	Kerċem Ajax F.C. Gozo Football League First Division; Gozo Football League Second Division	Artificial turf	
12		National Football Centre	350	Ta' Qali	Malta Football Association	Hybrid grass	

== Future stadiums ==
Stadium	Capacity	City	Home team	Website
Santa Lucija Sports Complex	822	Santa Lucija		
Corradino Football and Rugby Complex	648	Paola		
Naxxar Sports Complex	400	Naxxar	Naxxar Lions	
Sannat Stadium		Sannat (Gozo)	Sannat Lions; Gozo Football Association	

== Proposed stadiums ==
Photo	Stadium	Capacity	City	Home team	Website
	National Stadium	12,000	Ta' Qali	Malta Football Association	
	Malta Premier League Stadium	5,000	Marsa	Malta Premier League	
	Independence Arena	4,000	Floriana	Floriana	
	Spartans Arena	3,000	Hamrun	Hamrun Spartans	
	MFA Stadium	2,000	Ta' Qali	Malta Football Association	
	Valletta Stadium		Ħal Farruġ	Valletta	
	Marsa Stadium		Marsa	Marsa	

== Former stadiums ==
Image	Stadium	Capacity	City	Home team	Surface	Website
	Empire Stadium	30,000	Gżira	National football team	Gravel	
	Mile End Sports Ground	10,000	Hamrun		Gravel	
	Manoel Island Football Ground		Manoel Island, Gżira		Gravel	
	Pace Grasso Stadium		Paola		Gravel	

== See also ==
- Lists of stadiums
