= Birżebbuġa Football Center =

Birżebbuġa, Malta sports stadium

- Interactive map of Birżebbuġa Football Center
- Location: Triq Joseph Farrugia, 'Ir-Riki, Birżebbuġa, Malta
- Coordinates: 35°49′39″N 14°31′55″E
- Owner: Birżebbuġa St. Peter's F.C.
- Operator: Birżebbuġa St. Peter's F.C.
- Capacity: 1200
- Surface: Artificial grass
- Field size: 105x68

Construction
- Opened: 2018
- Cost: 2 million

Tenant
- Birżebbuġa St. Peter's F.C.

The Birżebbuġa Football Center is a sports stadium mainly used by the club Birżebbuġa St. Peter's F.C. and it is located in Triq Joseph Farrugia, Birżebbuġa, Malta.

== Description ==
Birzebbuga Football Ground is a Sports complex located in Triq Il-Port Hieles Birżebbuġa. It is one of the Sports complexs in Malta.

The soccer field was inaugurated on 1 December 2018, becoming the first soccer field in the city of Birżebbuġa. The soccer field and its associated facilities represented an investment of approximately €2 million.

== Transport connections ==
There are few connection to the stadium.

Bus Numberː	Locationː
80	Birzebbugia
82	Birzebbugia Marconi
119	Marsaskala
210	Mater Dei
X4	Birzebbugia

== See also ==
- Birżebbuġa
- Birżebbuġa St. Peter's F.C.
- List of football stadiums in Malta
