= Birżebbuġa St. Peter's F.C. =

Maltese football club

Birżebbuġa St. Peter's
- Full name: Birżebbuġa St. Peter's Football Club
- Nickname: The Saints
- Founded: 1946; 80 years ago
- Ground: Centenary Stadium; Birżebbuġa Football Center
- Capacity: 2,000
- Owner: Ketan Makwana
- Director: Joseph Mangion
- Head Coach: Luciano Santana
- League: Premier League
- 2024–25: Maltese Challenge League, 2nd of 16 (promoted via play-offs)
- Website: https://bspfc.com/

Birżebbuġa St. Peter's Football Club is a Maltese football club from the southern town of Birżebbuġa, which currently plays in the Maltese Premier League. They are the only football team from the town of Birżebbuġa. They are known for producing young players from their Youth Nursery, which is called Birżebbuġa Windmill Youth Nursery.

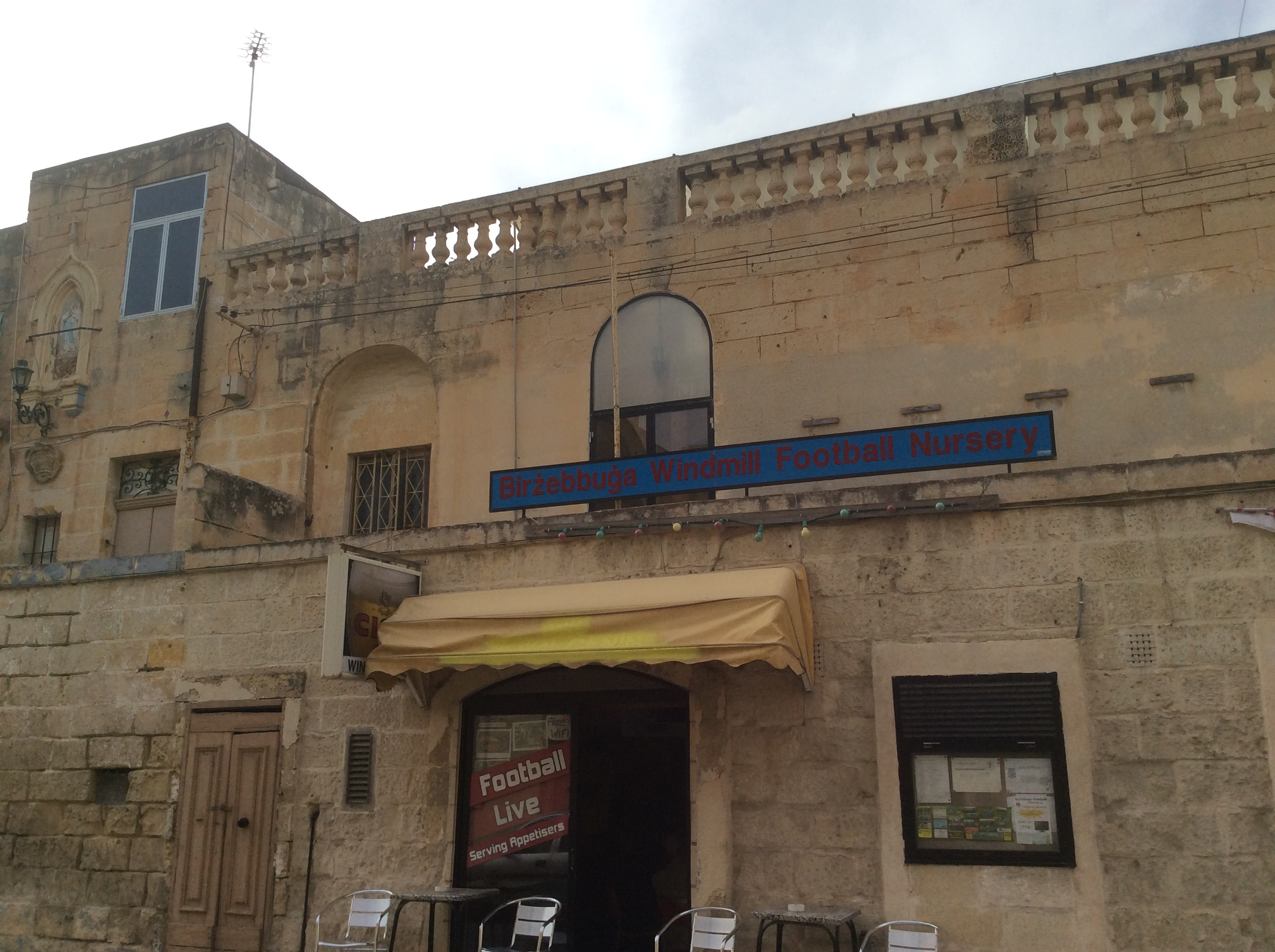
Birzebbuga Windmill Football Nursery

== History ==
=== Amateur League Champion ===
In February 2025, due to unsatisfactory results, Edward Azzopardi resigned as coach and was replaced by Edgar Degabriele. In April 2026, 77 Sports Investments announced it had acquired an 80% stake in the club.

In April 2025, Birżebbuġa St. Peter's FC won the Maltese National Amateur League for the first time in their history and were officially crowned champions of the Amateur League. The team received the trophy during an awards ceremony organised by the Malta Football Association.

=== Amateur Super Cup ===
In April 2026, the team finished second in the Maltese Challenge League, achieving promotion to the Maltese Premier League for the first time in their history, after beating Swieqi United on penalties.

In May 2026, Birzebbuga St Peter’s FC won the BOV Challenge Cup after beating Melita FC 3-0 in an entertaining Final at the National Stadium.

In June 2026, the club redesigned the new crest, reflecting the identity of Birżebbuġa St. Peter’s FC, combining traditional symbols with a modern and distinctive visual style.

=== Maltese Premier League ===
The club signed the brazilian striker Yuri de Jesus Messias. On 16 June 2026, the club have reached an agreement with Colombian midfielder Jackson Mendoza. The club signed also The italian defender Mattia Santi and Shaun Dimech. On 8 September 2026, Edgar Degabriele steps down as Head Coach and he was repleased by Luciano Santana.

== Futsal ==
This club also fields a Futsal team, under the name of Birżebbuġa St. Peter's FC Futsal that competes in the Maltese Futsal League. They finished 8th in the 2024–25.

== Crest and colours ==
The crest of the club was created in early 1949. The colours of the club are blue and white. In 2026, the club redesigned its logo. While maintaining the club's traditional blue and gold colors, the new crest maintains a strong connection to its history. The new crest reflects the identity of Birżebbuġa St. Peter’s FC, combining traditional symbols with a modern and distinctive visual style. The new logo features a soccer ball at the center of the emblem, symbolizing the club's passion for the sport and its commitment to sporting excellence. The intertwined initials BSPFC stand out in the center, strengthening the club's identity and unity. Inspired by the club's patron saint, St. Peter, the crest incorporates the iconic crossed keys, a symbol closely linked to the saint and a powerful reminder of the club's roots and values. The surrounding laurel branches celebrate achievement, perseverance, and the ambition to continue pursuing success both on and off the pitch.

Old logo until 2026

== Infrastructure ==
=== Stadium ===
Outside of the Centenary Stadium

The club play at Centenary Stadium is a stadium located in Ta' Qali, Malta. The stadium was built in 2017 with a capacity of 2,000 spectators.

=== Training centre ===
The club has trained at Birżebbuġa Football Center located in Birżebbuġa. The stadium was built in 2013 with a capacity of 1200 spectators with an investment of around €2 million.

== Current squad ==
As of 18 November 2026

Note: Flags indicate national team as defined under FIFA eligibility rules; some limited exceptions apply. Players may hold more than one non-FIFA nationality.

No.	Pos.	Nation	Player
1	GK	ITA	Mattia Chiesa
2	DF	BRA	Gustavo Felipe
4	DF	MLT	Miguel Azzopardi (on loan from Żabbar St. Patrick)
5	MF	MLT	Zachary Cassar
6	MF	MLT	Hubert Vella (captain)
7	MF	MLT	Shaun Dimech
8	FW	MLT	Matthew Xuereb
9	FW	SUR	Daishawn Redan
11	DF	BEL	Pietro Tomaselli
14	DF	CAN	Sam Azimzadeh Tabrizi
15	FW	CRO	Stipe Tokic
17	DF	MLT	Jacob Walker
18	MF	DEN	Rasmus Thellufsen

No.	Pos.	Nation	Player
20	FW	BRA	Gabriel Costa
21	MF	MLT	Kurt Bondin
22	GK	MLT	Julian Azzopardi
24	MF	COL	Luis Riascos
25	DF	COL	Juan Bolaños
26	DF	ITA	Alessandro Coppola
29	MF	BRA	Alex Bruno
77	DF	MLT	Aiden Barbara
94	DF	MLT	Daniel Zerafa
98	MF	COL	Jackson Mendoza
—	DF	MLT	Jurgen Farrugia
9	DF	MLT	Daniel Camenzuli

=== Out on loan ===
Note: Flags indicate national team as defined under FIFA eligibility rules; some limited exceptions apply. Players may hold more than one non-FIFA nationality.

No. / Pos. / Nation / Player	No. / Pos. / Nation / Player

=== Other players under contract ===
Note: Flags indicate national team as defined under FIFA eligibility rules; some limited exceptions apply. Players may hold more than one non-FIFA nationality.

No. / Pos. / Nation / Player	No. / Pos. / Nation / Player

== Honours ==
=== Domestic competitions ===
National Amateur League 1

- Winners (1): 2024-25

National Amateur Super Cup

- Winners (2): 2024-25

BOV Third Division

- Winners (1): 1953–54, 1997–98, 2005–06

Maltese Second and Third Division Knock-Out

- Winners (2): 1960-61, 1964-65
- Runners-up (1): 2006–07

Maltese Challenge League

- Runners-up (1): 2025–26

== League and cup history ==
Season	Div.	Pos.	Pl.	W	D	L	GS	GA	P	Domestic Cup	Europe		Notes
2020–21	3th "A" (Amateur League)	5	14	5	2	7	23	23	17	First round			
2021–22	3th "A" (Amateur League)	3	18	8	6	4	21	12	30				
2022–23	3th "B" (Amateur League)	6	20	9	1	10	35	29	28	Round of 64			
2023–24	3th "B" (Amateur League)	2	22	15	4	3	67	26	49				
2024–25	3th "2" (Amateur League)	1	15	10	3	2	30	33	42				Promoted to Maltese Challenge Leaguewin play-off Vittoriosa Stars F.C. 2-0
2025–26	2nd "2" (Maltese Challenge League)	2	22	14	4	4	48	28	46	Round of 16			Promoted to Maltese Premier League win play-off Swieqi United 1:1 (6:7 pen)
2026–27	1st "2" (Maltese Premier League)	12th	1	0	1	7	3	17	880	TBD	-	-	TBD

== Head coaches ==
- (Malta) Kenneth Costantino (2008 – 2010)
- (Malta) Joe Gerada (28 May 2010 – 12 october 2012)
- (Malta) Patrick Curmi (12 october 2012 – 12 october 2012)
- (Malta) Kenneth Costantino (12 october 2012–18 June 2015)
- (Malta) Roberto Debrincat (18 June 2015 – 10 May 2016)
- (Malta) Kenneth Costantino (10 May 2016 – 2019)
- (Malta) Raymond Schembri (2019-2020)
- (Malta) Paul Camilleri (2020-2023)
- (Malta) Edward Azzopardi (08 June 2023 – 18 February 2025)
- (Malta) Edgar Degabriele (20 February 2025 – 8 September 2026)
- (Spain) Luciano Santana (9 September 2026 – At present)

== See also ==
- Birżebbuġa
- Birżebbuġa Football Center
