= 2024–25 Maltese Challenge League =

Maltese Challenge League
- Season: 2024–25
- Dates: 14 September 2024 – April or May 2025
- Champions: Valletta F.C.
- Matches: 52
- Goals: 125 (2.4 per match)
- Top goalscorer: Andrei Ciolacu (7 Goals)
- Biggest home win: Valletta 6–0 Lija Athletic (22 September 2024)
- Biggest away win: Santa Lucia 0–5 Marsa (15 September 2024)
- Highest scoring: Santa Lucia 0–5 Marsa (15 September 2024)
- Longest winning run: Valletta; Pietà Hotspurs (4 Games Each)
- Longest unbeaten run: Marsa; Mgarr United (5 Games Each)
- Longest winless run: Żebbuġ Rangers (6 Games)
- Longest losing run: Żebbuġ Rangers (6 Games)
- All statistics correct as of 23 November 2024.

The 2024–25 Maltese Challenge League (referred to as the BOV Challenge League for sponsorship reasons) is the second-level league football in Malta. It is the fifth season that the competition has been running in its present form.

== Teams ==
The league consisted of sixteen teams; ten teams remaining from the previous season, two teams promoted from the 2023–24 Maltese National Amateur League, and four teams relegated from the 2023–24 Maltese Premier League.

=== Team changes ===
The following teams have changed divisions since the 2023–24 season:

==== To Maltese Challenge League ====
Promoted from Maltese National Amateur League

- Mgarr United
- Mtarfa

Relegated from the Maltese Premier League

- Gudja United
- Santa Lucia
- Sirens
- Valletta

==== From Maltese Challenge League ====
Promoted to the Maltese Premier League

- Melita
- Żabbar St. Patrick

Relegated to Maltese National Amateur League

- Attard
- Luqa St. Andrew's
- Msida Saint-Joseph
- Żejtun Corinthians

Location of teams in 2024–25 Maltese Challenge League

Team	Location	Manager
Fgura United	Fgura	(Malta) Kevin Vella
Gudja United	Gudja	(Nigeria) Orosco Anonam
Lija Athletic	Lija	(Malta) Joseph Galea
Marsa	Marsa	(Malta) Saviour Debono Grech
Mgarr United	Mgarr	(Malta) Brian Spiteri
Mtarfa	Mtarfa	(Malta) Ivan Casha
Pietà Hotspurs	Pietà	(Malta) Manuel Caruana
Santa Lucia	Santa Luċija	(Malta) Liam Mangion
Senglea Athletic	Senglea	(Malta) Robert Cassar
Sirens	St. Paul's Bay	(Malta) Stephen Damato
St. Andrews	St. Andrew's, Malta	(Malta) Jose` Borg
Swieqi United	Swieqi	(Argentina) Pablo Doffo
Tarxien Rainbows	Tarxien	(Malta) Jacques Scerri
Valletta	Valletta	(Malta) Thane Micallef
Żebbuġ Rangers	Żebbuġ	(Malta) Rodney Bugeja
Żurrieq	Żurrieq	(Malta) Francis Cassar

=== Kits ===
Team	Kit manufacturer	Shirt sponsor (front)	Shirt sponsor (back)	Shirt sponsor (sleeve)
Fgura United	Adidas	Fundazzjoni Sebħ, Trust Stamp, Euro Bridge, Iveco (Top Left)	EuroSport (Top), Rad Auto Dealer (Bottom)	Fundazzjoni Sebħ (Right), Hair Haven (Left)
Gudja United	Macron	Handy Man, SixSevenEight	Apex Group (Top)	Thomas Smith Insurance Broker (Left)
Lija Athletic	Macron	Falzon Group Of Companies	TeamSport (Top), La Crema (Bottom)	
Marsa	Legea	F Schembri		
Mgarr	Zeus	Zarb Coaches, SCS Sammut Concrete Supplies, Ballut Blocks, Big Mat	Frame Group (Top), GPC Concrete Solutions, Smart Transport LTD (Bottom)	Blaugrana (Left), Halmann Vella (Right)
Mtarfa	Givova	Angelo Stores Mtarfa		
Pietà Hotspurs	Jartazi	Famalco.net, A1 Supplies, Xuereb Installation	Farstone Construction (Top)	
Santa Lucia	Capelli Sport	Multivend, avanza	Elmo (Top), Konica Minolta (Bottom)	Yellow Army (Left), Levissima (Right)
Senglea Athletic	Givova	Palumbo, AUM, JCJuc Ltd		
Sirens	Macron	Café del Mar Malta, Welbee's	Arringo (Top), Malta National Aquarium (Bottom)	
St. Andrews	Macron	Fiat, Frank Salt		atg (Left), Marsali (Right)
Swieqi United	Erima	Platin P Casino, BEHR	Eight Four Capital (Top)	
Tarxien Rainbows	Erreà	Cassar, Dee Spas	Cargo Nigel (Bottom)	AEN (Right)
Valletta	Nike	Iniala	Inter Sport (Top)	Toyotomi, Da Mattia (Left), 5 Beans (Right)
Żebbuġ Rangers	Joma	The Convenience Shop, Coop Italia		
Żurrieq	Erima	Trust Payment	Xace (Top), Corendion, D£, B.home (Bottom)	Tax ORB (Left), Firetech (Right)

=== Managerial changes ===
Team	Outgoing manager	Manner of departure	Date of vacancy	Position in table	Incoming manager	Date of appointment
Senglea Athletic	(Malta) Liam Mangion	End of Contract	5 May 2024	Pre-season	(Malta) Robert Cassar	15 May 2024
Gudja United	(Malta) Renzo Kerr Cumbo	End of Contract	5 May 2024	Pre-season	(Nigeria) Orosco Anonam	11 May 2024
Żurrieq	(Malta) Saviour Debono Grech	Resign	5 May 2024	Pre-season	(Malta) Francis Cassar	9 May 2024
Marsa	(Nigeria) Orosco Anonym	Resign	8 May 2024	Pre-season	(Malta) Saviour Debono Grech	8 May 2024
Mtarfa	(Malta) George Magri	Resign	16 May 2024	Pre-season	(Malta) Ivan Casha	1 July 2024
Santa Lucia	(Italy) Alessandro Zinnari	Sign For Ħamrun Spartans	17 May 2024	Pre-season	(Malta) Liam Mangion	6 June 2024
St. Andrews	(Montenegro) Vesko Petrovic	End of Contract	25 May 2024	Pre-season	(Malta) Jose` Borg	29 May 2024
Valletta	(Argentina) Juan Cruz Gill	End of Caretaker	5 July 2024	Pre-season	(Malta) Thane Micallef	5 July 2024

== Venues ==
Ta' Qali	Ta' Qali	Location of host stadia during the 2024-25 Maltese Challenge League
Ta' Qali National Stadium	Centenary Stadium	Location of host stadia during the 2024-25 Maltese Challenge League
Capacity: 16,997	Capacity: 3,000	Location of host stadia during the 2024-25 Maltese Challenge League
St. Paul's Bay	Hamrun	Location of host stadia during the 2024-25 Maltese Challenge League
Sirens Stadium	Victor Tedesco Stadium	Location of host stadia during the 2024-25 Maltese Challenge League
Capacity: 1,024	Capacity: 1,962	Location of host stadia during the 2024-25 Maltese Challenge League

== Regular season ==
During the regular season, each team plays each other once (either at home or at away). The top eight teams qualify for the Top eight, while the bottom eight teams qualify for the Play-Out.

=== League table ===
Pos	Team	Pld	W	D	L	GF	GA	GD	Pts	Qualification
1	Valletta	15	12	2	1	28	4	+24	38	Qualification for the Top Eight
2	Tarxien Rainbows	15	9	2	4	22	16	+6	29	Qualification for the Top Eight
3	Marsa	15	8	4	3	25	13	+12	28	Qualification for the Top Eight
4	Swieqi United	15	8	4	3	22	17	+5	28	Qualification for the Top Eight
5	Pietà Hotspurs	15	8	2	5	21	19	+2	26	Qualification for the Top Eight
6	Santa Lucia	15	8	1	6	24	25	−1	25	Qualification for the Top Eight
7	Mgarr United	15	5	7	3	24	19	+5	22	Qualification for the Top Eight
8	Żurrieq	15	6	4	5	18	17	+1	22	Qualification for the Top Eight
9	Fgura United	15	6	3	6	17	14	+3	21	Qualification for the Play-Out
10	Gudja United	15	6	3	6	21	22	−1	21	Qualification for the Play-Out
11	Żebbuġ Rangers	15	3	8	4	22	20	+2	17	Qualification for the Play-Out
12	Sirens	15	4	5	6	25	26	−1	17	Qualification for the Play-Out
13	Lija Athletic	15	3	3	9	16	28	−12	12	Qualification for the Play-Out
14	St. Andrews	15	2	4	9	10	22	−12	10	Qualification for the Play-Out
15	Senglea Athletic	15	2	3	10	13	27	−14	9	Qualification for the Play-Out
16	Mtarfa	15	2	1	12	10	29	−19	7	Qualification for the Play-Out

Source: Malta Football Association
Rules for classification: 1) Points; 2) Play-offs (only if needed to decide champions or teams for relegation).

=== Results ===
Home \ Away	FGU	GUD	LJA	MSA	MGR	MTF	PIE	STL	SEN	SIR	STA	SWQ	TAR	VAL	ZEB	ZUR
Fgura United	—	1–2		1–2	—	—	1–2		14 Dec			—	5 Jan	—	—	
Gudja United	—	—	—		—			—	1 Dec	1–2	21 Dec		1–3	—	—	1–3
Lija Athletic		0–1	—	1–3		—	1–2	22 Dec		5 Jan	1–0	—		—	—	—
Marsa	—		—	—	—		—	—	1–0	1–1		15 Dec	1–2			1 Dec
Mgarr United	21 Dec	0–1		2–2	—	—	4–0		5 Jan		2–1	—	—	—	—	
Mtarfa	1–2		2–1	4 Jan	0–2	—	15 Dec	30 Nov	—	—		—	—	0–1		—
Pietà Hotspurs	—		—	22 Dec	—	—	—	—	2–1	30 Nov		—	3–1			1–2
Santa Lucia		0–0	—	0–5	5–3	—	0–1	—		15 Dec	2–0	—		—	—	4 Jan
Senglea Athletic	—	—		—	—	2–1	—		—		—	0–2	21 Dec	1–2	1–1	1–3
Sirens		—	—	—		3–1	—	—		—	—	3–0		0–3	2–2	22 Dec
St. Andrews	—	—	—		—			—	0–0	1–1	—		30 Nov	14 Dec	—	0–2
Swieqi United	0–1		1 Dec	—	0–0	21 Dec	4 Jan	3–2	—	—		—	—			—
Tarxien Rainbows	—	—		—	15 Dec	2–0	—		—		—	1–1	—	1–0	2–0	
Valletta	3–0	4 Jan	6–0		30 Nov			3–0	—	—	—		—	—	22 Dec	—
Żebbuġ Rangers	1 Dec	14 Dec	2–2		1–1			1–2	—	—	5 Jan		—	—	—	—
Żurrieq		—	14 Dec	—		1–0	—	—		—	—	1–2		0–1	1–0	—

Updated to match(es) played on 2 February 2025. Source: Malta Football Association
Legend: Blue = home team win; Yellow = draw; Red = away team win.
For upcoming matches, an "a" indicates there is an article about the rivalry between the two participants.

== Second phase ==
=== Top eight ===
The top eight teams from the regular season face each other once more (either at home or away), with the top two teams earning promotion to the 2025–26 Maltese Premier League. Results from the regular season were carried over into this round.

==== League table ====
Pos	Team	Pld	W	D	L	GF	GA	GD	Pts	Promotion
1	Valletta (C, P)	22	19	2	1	49	7	+42	59	Promotion to the 2025–26 Maltese Premier League
2	Tarxien Rainbows (P)	22	11	6	5	29	22	+7	39	Promotion to the 2025–26 Maltese Premier League
3	Swieqi United	22	10	6	6	33	29	+4	36	
4	Pietà Hotspurs	22	10	5	7	34	30	+4	35	
5	Żurrieq	22	9	5	8	32	31	+1	32	
6	Santa Lucia	22	9	5	8	36	41	−5	32	
7	Mgarr United	22	7	10	5	32	28	+4	31	
8	Marsa	22	8	5	9	32	34	−2	29	

Source: Malta Football Association
Rules for classification: 1) Points; 2) Play-offs (only if needed to decide champions).
(C) Champions; (P) Promoted

=== Play-Out ===
The bottom eight teams from the regular season face each other for the second time (either at home or away), with the bottom two teams being relegated to the 2025–26 Maltese National Amateur League. Results from the regular season were carried over into this round.

==== League table ====
Pos	Team	Pld	W	D	L	GF	GA	GD	Pts	Relegation
1	Fgura United	22	11	3	8	37	24	+13	36	
2	St. Andrews	22	8	5	9	24	27	−3	29	
3	Sirens	22	7	6	9	37	40	−3	27	
4	Gudja United	22	7	6	9	30	34	−4	27	
5	Żebbuġ Rangers	22	4	9	9	29	40	−11	21	
6	Mtarfa	22	6	2	14	23	39	−16	20	
7	Lija Athletic (R)	22	5	4	13	25	38	−13	19	Relegation to the 2025–26 Maltese National Amateur League
8	Senglea Athletic (R)	22	3	5	14	20	38	−18	14	Relegation to the 2025–26 Maltese National Amateur League

Source: Malta Football Association
Rules for classification: 1) Points; 2) Play-offs (only if needed to decide teams for relegation).
(R) Relegated

== Season statistics ==
=== Scoring ===
==== Top scorers ====
As of 23 November 2024

Rank	Player	Club	Goals
1	(Romania) Andrei Ciolacu	Valletta	7
2	(United States) Sulahmana Mamadu Bah	Zurrieq	5
3	(Malta) Lydon Micallef	Marsa	4
3	(Ghana) Emmanuel Bio	Pieta' Hotspurs	4
3	(Colombia) Duvan Mosquera Torres	Zebbug Rangers	4
6	(Brazil) Diego Silva Caetano	Gudja United	3
6	(Albania) Erjon Beu	Lija Athletic	3
6	(Malta) Jurgen Suda	Mgarr United	3
6	(Ghana) Samuel Boakye	Mgarr United	3
6	(Brazil) Gilberto Martins Leite Carrara	Sirens	3
6	(Ghana) Blessing Brafo	Swieqi United	3
6	(Malta) James Scicluna	Valletta	3
6	(Colombia) Camilo Andres Diaz Arias	Zebbug Rangers	3
6	(Malta) Sebastian Grech	Zurrieq	3

==== Hat-tricks ====
Player	For	Against	Result	Stadium	Date
(United States) Sulahmana Mamadu Bah	Zurrieq	Gudja United	3–1 (A)	Victor Tedesco Stadium, Hamrun	19 October 2024
(Romania) Andrei Ciolacu	Valletta	Santa Lucia	3–0 (A)	Victor Tedesco Stadium, Hamrun	20 October 2024

=== Clean sheets ===
Rank	Player	Club	Clean sheets
1	(Malta) Johnathan Debono	Mgarr United	5
1	(Malta) Timothy Aquilina	Valletta	5
3	(Malta) Jurgen Borg	Żurrieq	3
4	(Malta) Daniel Attard	Gudja United	2
4	(Malta) Ryan Caruana	Marsa	2
4	(Malta) Jean Claude Debattista	Swieqi United	2
4	(Malta) Jake Pisani	St. Andrews	2
4	(Malta) Andreas Vella	Tarxien Rainbows	2
9	(Malta) Yenz Cini	Fgura United	1
9	(Malta) James Pisani	Gudja United	1
9	(Malta) Luke Bonnici	Lija Athletic	1
9	(Malta) Jake Farrugia	Pieta' Hotspurs	1
9	(Malta) Christopher Farrugia	Santa Lucia	1
9	(Malta) Johnathan Grech	Senglea Athletic	1
9	(Malta) Andrea Cassar	Sirens	1
9	(Malta) Jamie Azzopardi	Zebbug Rangers	1

=== Discipline ===
==== Player ====
- Most yellow cards: 5
  - (Malta) Dylan Agius (Marsa)
- Most red cards: 1
  - (Malta) Julian Camilleri (Lija Athletic)
  - (Malta) Andy Gilson (Mtarfa)
  - (Malta) Ayrton Senna Azzopardi (Mtarfa)
  - (Malta) Zean Leornardi (Pieta' Hotspurs)
  - (Malta) Dylan Mangion (Santa Lucia)
  - (Brazil) Jean Carlos Cloth Goncalves (Santa Lucia)
  - (Malta) Andrea Cassar (Sirens)
  - (Malta) Sammy Elfarsi (Sirens)
  - (Brazil) Elizeu Espirito Santo Da Conceicao (St. Andrews)
  - (Malta) Andre Spiteri (Tarxien Rainbows)

==== Club ====
- Most yellow cards: 24
  - Santa Lucia
- Most red cards: 3
  - Mtarfa
