= Edward Azzopardi =

Maltese footballer

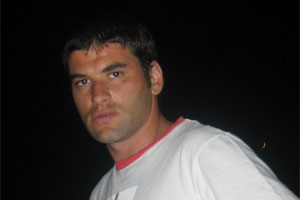

Personal information
- Full name: Edward Azzopardi
- Date of birth: 13 December 1977 (age 48)
- Place of birth: Rabat, Malta
- Position: Defender

Senior career*
Years	Team	Apps	(Gls)
1995–1999	Rabat Ajax	61	(4)
1999–2003	Valletta	47	(3)
2001	→Rabat Ajax (loan)	15	(1)
2003–2004	Pietà Hotspurs	26	(2)
2004–2005	Hibernians	6	(0)
2005–2007	Qormi	47	(7)
2007–2008	Birzebbuga St. Peters		
2008–2009	Rabat Ajax		
2009–2014	Żejtun Corinthians		

International career^{‡}
- Malta U16
- Malta U18
- Malta U21
1999–2000	Malta	5	(0)

Managerial career
- 2014–2015: Żejtun
- 2016–2018: Rabat Ajax
- 2020–2023: Kalkara
- 2024–2025: Birżebbuġa St. Peter's
- * Club domestic league appearances and goals as of 15 June 2026 ‡ National team caps and goals as of 10 January 2010

Edward Azzopardi (born 13 December 1977) is a Maltese professional footballer manager and retired player.

== Coach Career ==
=== Birżebbuġa St. Peter's F.C. ===
In 2023, he was appointed as coach of Birżebbuġa St. Peter's. In February 2025, he resigned as coach and was replaced by Edgar Degabriele.

== Honours ==
=== As a Player ===
Valletta

- Maltese Premier Leagueː 2000–01
- Maltese FA Trophyː 2000–01
- Maltese Super Cupː 1999, 2001
- Super 5 Lottery Tournamentː 1999–2000, 2000–01
- Centenary Cupː 2000–01

=== As a Coach ===
Birżebbuġa St. Peter's F.C.

- National Amateur League 1: 2024-25
- National Amateur Super Cupː 2024-25
