= 2024–25 Maltese National Amateur League =

Maltese National Amateur League
- Season: 2024–25
- Dates: 13 September 2024 – April 2025
- Champions: Birzebbuga St. Peter's
- Promoted: Birzebbuga St. Peter's; Vittoriosa Stars
- Relegated: Gharghur; Marsaskala; Msida Saint-Joseph; Rabat Ajax
- Matches: 48
- Goals: 152 (3.17 per match)
- Top goalscorer: Pavlidis Claudio Antunes; Samuel Saldanha; Sherif Mohammed Iddrisu (7 Goals Each)
- Biggest home win: Vittoriosa Stars 3–0 San Ġwann (23 September 2024); Attard 3–0 Rabat Ajax (5 October 2024); Luqa St. Andrew's 4–1 Żejtun Corinthians (6 October 2024); Xgħajra Tornadoes 5–2 Msida Saint-Joseph (26 October 2024)
- Biggest away win: Pembroke Athleta 0–5 Luqa St. Andrew's (22 September 2024); Marsaskala 3–5 Luqa St. Andrew's (9 November 2024)
- Highest scoring: Marsaskala 3–5 Attard (20 October 2024)
- Longest winning run: Luqa St. Andrew's (5 Games)
- Longest unbeaten run: Birzebbuga St. Peter's; Vittoriosa Stars; Xgħajra Tornadoes (6 Games Each)
- Longest winless run: Gharghur; Marsaskala; Msida Saint-Joseph; Rabat Ajax; Żejtun Corinthians (6 Games Each)
- Longest losing run: Rabat Ajax (6 Games)
- All statistics correct as of 10 November 2024.

The 2024–25 Maltese National Amateur League (referred to, for sponsorship reasons, as the IZIBet National Amateur League) occurs between 13 September 2024 and April 2025. This will be the first season with one group Amateur League system.

== Team changes ==
The following teams have changed divisions since the 2023–24 season:

Promoted from 2023–24 Maltese National Amateur League	Relegated from 2023–24 Maltese Challenge League	Relegated to 2024–25 Maltese National Amateur League II
Mgarr United; Mtarfa	Attard; Luqa St. Andrew's; Msida Saint-Joseph; Żejtun Corinthians	Dingli Swallows; Ghaxaq; Kalkara United; Mdina Knights; Mqabba; Santa Venera Lightnings; Siggiewi; St. George's; Ta' Xbiex

== Teams ==
Sixteen teams competed in the 2024-25 League.

Location of Maltese clubs played in Maltese Premier League

Team	Location	Manager
Attard	Attard	(Malta) Ivan Zammit
Birzebbuga St. Peter's	Birzebbuga	(Malta) Edward Azzopardi
Gharghur	Gharghur	(Malta) Kevin Borg Degiorgio
Kirkop United	Kirkop	(Malta) Matthew Caruana
Luqa St. Andrew's	Luqa	(Malta) Neville Galea
Marsaskala	Marsaskala	(Malta) Brian Vella
Mellieħa	Mellieħa	(Malta) Warren Said
Msida Saint-Joseph	Msida	(Malta) Paul Bugeja
Pembroke Athleta	Pembroke	(Malta) Jeffrey Mifsud
Qormi	Qormi	(Malta) Lydon Fenech
Qrendi	Qrendi	(Malta) Gotthard Conti
Rabat Ajax	Rabat	(Malta) Charles Borg
San Ġwann	San Ġwann	(Malta) Xavier Saliba
Vittoriosa Stars	Birgu	(Malta) Jason Camenzuli
Xgħajra Tornados	Xghajra	(Malta) Keith Darmanin
Żejtun Corinthians	Zejtun	(Malta) Paul Falzon

=== Managerial changes ===
Team	Outgoing manager	Manner of departure	Date of vacancy	Position in table	Incoming manager	Date of appointment
Rabat Ajax	(Malta) Paul Falzon	Resign	7 May 2024	Pre-season	(Malta) Charles Borg	11 July 2024
Luqa St. Andrew's	(Malta) Edmond Lufi	Mutual Agreement	8 May 2024	Pre-season	(Malta) Neville Galea	23 May 2024
Vittoriosa Stars	(Malta) Dennis Apap	Resign	10 May 2024	Pre-season	(Malta) Jason Camenzuli	11 May 2024
Msida Saint-Joseph	(Malta) Neville Galea	Resign	10 May 2024	Pre-season	(Malta) Paul Bugeja	1 July 2024
Żejtun Corinthians	(Malta) Ivan Casha	Mutual Agreement	14 May 2024	Pre-season	(Malta) Paul Falzon	1 July 2024
Attard	(Malta) Robert Magro	30 June 2024	End of Contract	Pre-season	(Malta) Ivan Zammit	12 September 2024

== Venues ==
2024–25 Maltese National Amateur League is located in Malta	Pembroke	Mosta	San Pawl il-Baħar	Ta' Qali
2024–25 Maltese National Amateur League is located in Malta	Luxol Stadium	Charles Abela Stadium	Sirens Stadium	Centenary Stadium
2024–25 Maltese National Amateur League is located in Malta	Capacity: 600	Capacity: 700	Capacity: 800	Capacity: 3,000

== Regular season ==
During the regular season, each team plays each other once (either at home or away). The top six teams qualify for the Top six, while the bottom ten teams qualify for the Play-Out.

=== League stage ===
Pos	Team	Pld	W	D	L	GF	GA	GD	Pts	Qualification
1	San Ġwann	15	12	2	1	38	13	+25	38	Qualification for the Top Six
2	Vittoriosa Stars	15	11	3	1	34	12	+22	36	Qualification for the Top Six
3	Birzebbuga St. Peter's	15	10	3	2	30	13	+17	33	Qualification for the Top Six
4	Luqa St. Andrew's	15	10	1	4	31	14	+17	31	Qualification for the Top Six
5	Xgħajra Tornados	15	9	3	3	39	25	+14	30	Qualification for the Top Six
6	Attard	15	9	0	6	23	19	+4	27	Qualification for the Top Six
7	Qrendi	15	7	3	5	31	22	+9	24	Qualification for the Play-Out
8	Qormi	15	7	1	7	22	19	+3	22	Qualification for the Play-Out
9	Żejtun Corinthians	15	5	4	6	20	25	−5	19	Qualification for the Play-Out
10	Mellieħa	15	4	5	6	15	16	−1	17	Qualification for the Play-Out
11	Kirkop United	15	5	1	9	27	31	−4	16	Qualification for the Play-Out
12	Marsaskala	15	4	3	8	30	39	−9	15	Qualification for the Play-Out
13	Pembroke Athleta	15	4	1	10	16	33	−17	13	Qualification for the Play-Out
14	Gharghur	15	2	4	9	13	29	−16	10	Qualification for the Play-Out
15	Rabat Ajax	15	2	0	13	11	44	−33	6	Qualification for the Play-Out
16	Msida Saint-Joseph	15	0	4	11	13	39	−26	4	Qualification for the Play-Out

Rules for classification: 1) Points; 2) Play-offs (only if needed to decide champions, relegation, or teams for relegation play-offs).

== Results ==
Home \ Away	ATT	BRZ	GHR	KRK	LQA	MRK	MLH	MSI	PBK	QOR	QRE	RBT	SGN	VIT	XJR	ZEJ
Attard	—	1–2	—	2–1	2–2	—	0–2	—	—	—	—	3–0	0–2	0–2	2–1	1–0
Birzebbuga St. Peter's	—	—	—	3–2	0–0	—	—	—	—	1–0	—	2–0	0–1	0–0	0–5	5–2
Gharghur	0–4	1–4	—	4–3	1–0	1–1	1–2	—	1–3	—	—	—	—	—	—	1–2
Kirkop United	—	—	—	—	—	—	—	—	0–0	3–2	1–3	—	0–3	2–3	1–2	0–1
Luqa St. Andrew's	0–2	—	—	1–3	—	—	2–0	—	—	3–0	2–0	3–1	—	1–0	—	4–1
Marsaskala	3–5	0–4	—	2–1	0–5	—	2–2	4–2	—	—	—	—	—	2–3	—	2–3
Mellieħa	—	0–0	—	1–2	—	—	—	—	—	0–0	0–1	2–0	—	1–3	0–1	0–0
Msida Saint-Joseph	0–1	0–4	0–1	1–3	0–2	—	1–1	—	—	—	—	1–5	—	1–1	—	—
Pembroke Athleta	1–2	1–3	—	—	0–5	0–2	0–2	4–2	—	—	—	2–0	—	0–2	—	—
Qormi	1–0	—	1–0	—	—	3–1	—	4–2	1–2	—	2–0	—	—	—	1–3	—
Qrendi	4–0	0–2	1–1	—	—	3–3	—	1–1	3–2	—	—	—	1–3	—	—	—
Rabat Ajax	—	—	1–0	3–5	—	0–5	—	—	—	0–2	0–3	—	0–5	—	0–3	—
San Ġwann	—	—	0–0	—	4–1	2–1	3–2	3–0	5–0	2–1	—	—	—	—	—	—
Vittoriosa Stars	—	—	5–1	—	—	—	—	—	—	2–1	2–1	4–1	3–0	—	4–1	0–0
Xgħajra Tornados	—	—	1–1	—	3–1	5–2	—	5–2	2–1	—	2–5	—	3–3	—	—	—
Żejtun Corinthians	—	—	—	—	—	—	—	0–0	3–0	0–3	1–5	4–0	1–2	—	2–2	—

Updated to match(es) played on 24 July 2025. Source:
Legend: Blue = home team win; Yellow = draw; Red = away team win.

== Second phase ==
=== Top Six ===
The top six teams from the regular season face each other once more (either at home or away), with the top two teams earning promotion to the 2025–26 Maltese Challenge League. Results from the regular season were carried over into this round.

=== Play-Out ===
The bottom ten teams from the regular season face each other for the second time (either at home or away), with the bottom four teams being relegated to the 2025–26 Maltese National Amateur League 2. Results from the regular season were carried over into this round.

=== League stage ===
Pos	Team	Pld	W	D	L	GF	GA	GD	Pts	Qualification
1	Vittoriosa Stars	20	14	4	2	43	19	+24	46	Promotion to the 2025–26 Maltese Challenge League
2	Birzebbuga St. Peter's	20	14	4	2	43	19	+24	46	Promotion to the 2025–26 Maltese Challenge League
3	San Ġwann	20	14	3	3	45	21	+24	45	
4	Xgħajra Tornados	20	10	5	5	44	31	+13	35	
5	Luqa St. Andrew's	20	10	4	6	37	22	+15	34	
6	Attard	20	9	2	9	27	28	−1	29	
7	Qormi	24	13	4	7	44	31	+13	43	
8	Mellieħa	24	11	6	7	43	25	+18	39	
9	Qrendi	24	12	3	9	53	39	+14	39	
10	Żejtun Corinthians	24	9	9	6	39	35	+4	36	
11	Kirkop United	24	9	4	11	45	41	+4	31	
12	Pembroke Athleta	24	8	1	15	34	54	−20	25	
13	Gharghur	24	6	5	13	32	50	−18	23	Relegation to the 2025–26 Maltese National Amateur League
14	Marsaskala	24	6	4	14	51	66	−15	22	Relegation to the 2025–26 Maltese National Amateur League
15	Rabat Ajax	24	2	3	19	21	73	−52	9	Relegation to the 2025–26 Maltese National Amateur League
16	Msida Saint-Joseph	24	0	5	19	18	65	−47	5	Relegation to the 2025–26 Maltese National Amateur League

Rules for classification: 1) Points; 2) Play-offs (only if needed to decide champions, relegation, or teams for relegation play-offs).

== Championship Decider ==
Birzebbuga St. Peter's F.C. 2-0 Vittoriosa Stars F.C.

== Statistics ==
=== Top scorers ===
As of 10 November 2024

Rank	Player	Club	Goals
1	(Brazil) Samuel Saldanha	Birzebbuga St.Peter's	7
1	(Ghana) Sherif Mohammed Iddrisu	Luqa St. Andrew’s	7
1	(Brazil) Pavlidis Claudio Antunes	Qormi	7
4	(Albania) Bledi Alla	Attard	6
4	(Brazil) Leonardo Fernandes Andrade	Qrendi	6
4	(Malta) Larson Mallia	Xghajra Tornados	6
7	(Malta) Bydasser Sammut	Luqa St. Andrew’s	5
7	(Nigeria) Godwin Emmanuel	Vittoriosa Stars	5
7	(Nigeria) Jojo Ogunnupe	Vittoriosa Stars	5
10	(Nigeria) Brandon Bray	Qrendi	4
11	(Nigeria) James Oghenekewaro	Marsaskala	3
11	(Ivory Coast) Marc Bolane Kakou Adonis	Mellieħa	3
11	(Malta) Jayden Zac Borg	Qormi	3
11	(Jamaica) Raylon Kaylon Paisley	Xgħajra Tornados	3

=== Hat-tricks ===
Player	For	Against	Result	Stadium	Date
(Albania) Bledi Alla	Attard	Marsaskala	5–3 (A)	Centenary Stadium, Ta' Qali	20 October 2024
(Malta) Larson Mallia	Xgħajra Tornados	Msida Saint-Joseph	5–2 (H)	Charles Abela Memorial Stadium, Mosta	26 October 2024
(Ghana) Sherif Mohammed Iddrisu	Luqa St. Andrew's	Marsaskala	5–0 (A)	Luxol Stadium, Pembroke	9 November 2024

=== Clean sheets ===
Rank	Player	Club	Clean sheets
1	(Malta) Zach Valletta	Attard	4
2	(Malta) Julian Azzopardi	Birzebbuga St.Peter's	3
2	(Malta) Dunstan Zarb	Luqa St. Andrew's	3
4	(Malta) Anthony Curmi	Mellieha	2
4	(Malta) Lydon Moore	Qormi	2
4	(Malta) Luciano Camilleri	San Gwann	2
7	(Malta) James Abela	Gharghur	1
7	(Malta) Christian Cassar	Qrendi	1
7	(Malta) Levi Saliba	Xgħajra Tornados	1
7	(Malta) Carmelo Caruana	Vittoriosa Stars	1
7	(Malta) Edward Gatt	Vittoriosa Stars	1
7	(Malta) Anson Saliba	Żejtun Corinthians	1

=== Discipline ===
==== Player ====
- Most yellow cards: 5
  - (Colombia) Camilo Del Castillo Escoba (Attard)
- Most red cards: 1
  - (Colombia) Camilo Del Castillo Escoba (Attard)
  - (Malta) Josmar Galea (Attard)
  - (Malta) Cain Cutajar (Marsaskala)
  - (Malta) Iven Zammit (Mellieħa)
  - (Malta) Alejandro Brincat (Msida Saint-Joseph)
  - (Malta) Kurt Farrugia (Pembroke Athleta)
  - (South Africa) Jordan Rayne Glen Sampson (Qormi)
  - (Malta) Kurt Desira (Qormi)
  - (Malta) Kewell Saliba (Qrendi)
  - (Malta) Aidan Agius Gilford (Vittoriosa Stars)
  - (Malta) Clive Spiteri (Vittoriosa Stars)
  - (Malta) Rooney Gatt (Żejtun Corinthians)

==== Club ====
- Most yellow cards: 15
  - Msida Saint-Joseph
  - Żejtun Corinthians
- Most red cards: 2
  - Qormi
  - Vittoriosa Stars
