= Centenary Stadium =

Stadium in Ta' Qali, Malta

Centenary
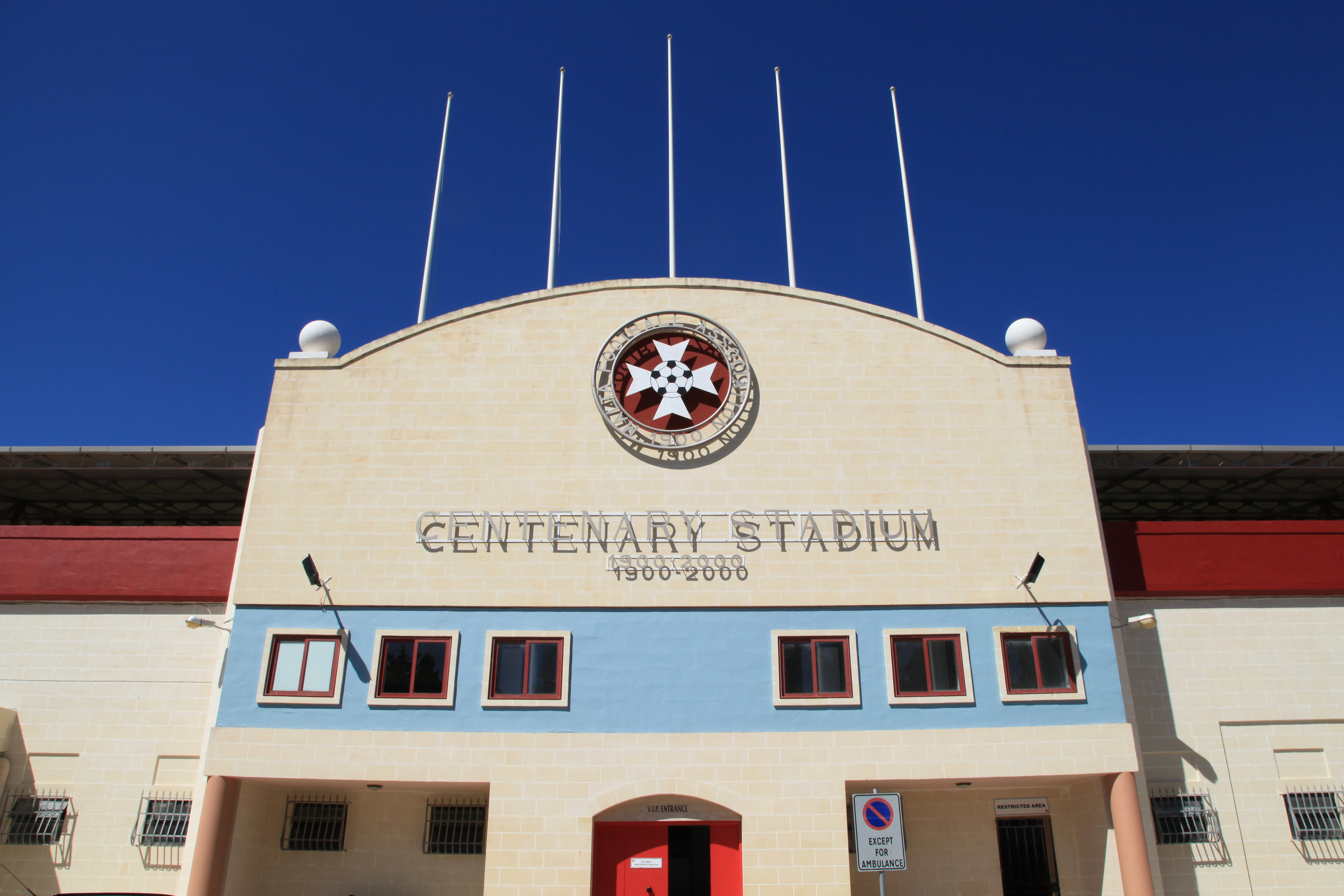
- Interactive map of Centenary
- Full name: Centenary Stadium
- Location: Ta' Qali, Malta
- Coordinates: 35°53′48″N 14°24′56″E
- Owner: Government of Malta
- Operator: Malta Football Association
- Capacity: 1,700
- Surface: Artificial turf

Construction
- Opened: 13 August 1999

Tenants
- Malta national under-21 football team Malta women's national football team Maltese Premier League; Maltese Challenge League; Maltese National Amateur League; Birżebbuġa St. Peter's

The Centenary Stadium (Maltese: il-Grawnd taċ-Ċentinarju) is a stadium located in Ta' Qali, Malta. The stadium, which is situated next to the National Stadium, houses the headquarters of the Malta Youth Football Association. It seats 3,000 and serves as the home stadium of the Malta national under-21 football team. The stadium, together with three other stadiums, also hosts matches of the Maltese Premier League, Maltese First Division and Maltese FA Trophy.

== History ==
=== Background and early years ===
As early as back in 1985, the Malta Football Association was already looking to develop a new small stadium. This idea started to take shape on 11 October 1998, when the then President of Malta Dr Ugo Mifsud Bonnici laid the first stone of the stadium. The development, which consisted in the construction of a main stand and a canopy, lasted less than a year as on 13 August 1999 the stadium was inaugurated by Dr Eddie Fenech Adami, Prime Minister of Malta, and Dr Joe Mifsud, the President of the Malta Football Association. In commemoration of the 100th anniversary of the Malta Football Association, the stadium was named the "Centenary Stadium". Besides a seating capacity of 3,000, the main stand also included a VIP and press area. Like the National Stadium, the Centenary Stadium replaced another stadium renowned for the gravel surface, the Pace Grasso Stadium in Tarxien.

The first competitive match held at the stadium was a group-stage encounter of the now-defunct Maltese 2nd and 3rd Knockout between Birżebbuġa St. Peter's and Ghaxaq on 4 September 1999. The first goal was scored by Ghaxaq's Sandro Lapira on 34 minutes, which paved the way for a 2-1 win for his team.

=== Pitch Resurfacing ===
In 2007, the original pitch laid back in 1999 was replaced by a new FIFA Two-Star artificial turf. The resurfacing costed Lm35,000 (€81,550) and was inaugurated on 23 July 2007.

In May 2017, the Malta Football Association announced that the stadium's pitch will be replaced by a new FIFA-quality pro pitch. The project, which also included the installation of new dug-outs and estimated to cost around €400,000, will mean that the stadium should now be able to host FIFA and UEFA matches.

=== Future ===
In January 2026, the Malta Football Association launched a stakeholder consultation for the re-development of the Ta' Qali Sports Complex. The planned redevelopment entails the addition of a spectators’ stand behind every goal and enhancement of stadium facilities.

== See also ==
- List of football stadiums in Malta
